= Deputy governor of Lagos State =

Second highest-ranking official in the executive branch of Lagos State in Nigeria

Deputy Governor of Lagos State
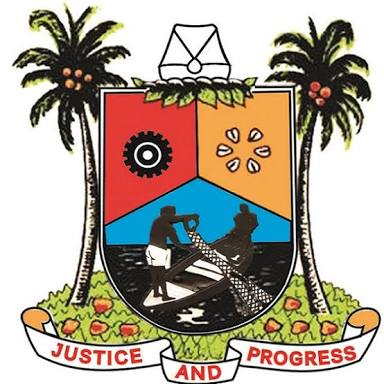
- Seal of Lagos State

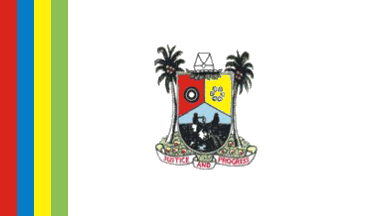
- Flag of Lagos State

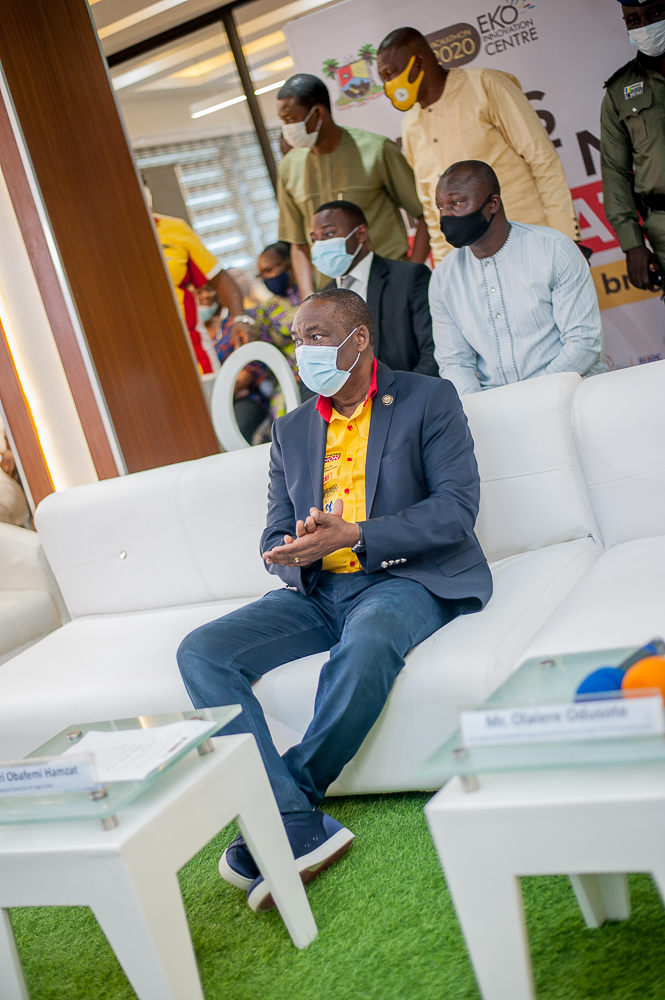
- Incumbent; Femi Hamzat since 29 May 2019
- Executive Branch of the Lagos State Government
- Style: Deputy Governor (informal); His Excellency (courtesy)
- Status: Second highest executive branch officer
- Member of: Lagos State Executive Branch; Lagos State Cabinet
- Residence: Deputy Governor's House
- Seat: Ikeja
- Nominator: Gubernatorial candidate
- Appointer: Direct popular election or, if vacant, Governor via House of Assembly confirmation
- Term length: Four years, renewable once
- Constituting instrument: Constitution of Nigeria
- Inaugural holder: Kofoworola Bucknor (Fourth Republic)
- Succession: First
- Website: lagosstate.gov.ng

The deputy governor of Lagos State is the second-highest officer in the executive branch of the government of Lagos State, after the governor of Lagos State, and ranks first in line of succession. The deputy governor is directly elected together with the governor to a four-year term of office.

Femi Hamzat is the current deputy governor of Lagos State, he assumed office on 29 May 2019.

== Qualifications ==
As in the case of the Governor, in order to be qualified to be elected as Deputy Governor, a person must:

- be at least thirty-five (35) years of age;
- be a Nigerian citizen by birth;
- be a member of a political party with endorsement by that political party;
- have School Certificate or its equivalent.

== Responsibilities ==
The Deputy Governor assists the Governor in exercising primary assignments and is also eligible to replace a dead, impeached, absent or ill Governor as required by the 1999 Constitution of Nigeria.

== List of deputy governors ==
Name	Took office	Left office	Time in office	Party	Elected	Governor
Rafiu Jafojo (1935–2016)	1 October 1979	31 December 1983	4 years, 91 days	Unity Party of Nigeria	1979; 1983	Lateef Jakande
Lateefat Okunnu (born 1939)	1 July 1990	2 January 1992	1 year, 185 days	National Republican Convention		Raji Rasaki
Sinatu Ojikutu (born 1946)	2 January 1992	17 November 1993	1 year, 319 days	National Republican Convention	1991	Michael Otedola
Kofoworola Bucknor (born 1939)	29 May 1999	16 December 2002	3 years, 201 days	Alliance for Democracy	1999	Bola Tinubu
Femi Pedro (born 1955)	14 January 2003	10 May 2007	4 years, 116 days	Alliance for Democracy	2003	Bola Tinubu
Abiodun Ogunleye (born 1940)	15 May 2007	29 May 2007	14 days	Action Congress of Nigeria		Bola Tinubu
Sarah Adebisi Sosan (born 1956)	29 May 2007	29 May 2011	4 years	Action Congress of Nigeria	2007	Babatunde Fashola
Adejoke Orelope-Adefulire (born 1959)	29 May 2011	29 May 2015	4 years	All Progressives Congress	2011	Babatunde Fashola
Oluranti Adebule (born 1970)	29 May 2015	29 May 2019	4 years	All Progressives Congress	2015	Akinwunmi Ambode
Femi Hamzat (born 1964)	29 May 2019	Incumbent	7 years, 101 days	All Progressives Congress	2019; 2023	Babajide Sanwo-Olu

== See also ==
- Governor of Lagos State
- Government of Lagos State
