= Okunnu =

Nigerian given name

- Gender: Male
- Language: Yoruba

Origin
- Origin: Nigeria
- Meaning: unknown
- Region of origin: South West, Nigeria

Okunnu is a Nigerian male given name and surname of Yoruba origin. Its meaning is unknown. Notable individuals with the name include:

- Lateefat Okunnu (3 December 1939), a Nigerian retired civil servant and administrator.
- Lateef Olufemi Okunnu (born 19 February 1933), a Nigerian lawyer.
