= 1991 Lagos State gubernatorial election =

1991 gubernatorial election in Lagos State, Nigeria

Lagos gubernatorial election
- 14 December 1991
Nominee	Michael Otedola
Party	NRC
Governor before election
Raji Rasaki
Elected Governor
Michael Otedola
NRC

The 1991 Lagos State gubernatorial election was a Nigerian gubernatorial election that occurred on 14 December 1991 and was won by NRC candidate Michael Otedola.

== Election and results ==
The election was conducted using an open ballot system. Primary elections, where the two parties selected their flag bearers, were conducted on 19 October 1991. The election, occurring on 14 December 1991, was won by NRC candidate Michael Otedola.
