= 1979 Lagos State gubernatorial election =

1979 gubernatorial election in Lagos State, Nigeria

- 28 July 1979
Nominee	Lateef Jakande
Party	UPN
Governor before election
Ebitu Ukiwe
Elected Governor
Lateef Jakande
UPN

The 1979 Lagos State gubernatorial election occurred on 28 July 1979. UPN candidate Lateef Jakande won the election.

== Results ==
Lateef Jakande representing UPN won the election. The election held on 28 July 1979.
