= 2003 Lagos State gubernatorial election =

2003 gubernatorial election in Lagos State, Nigeria

- (Nigeria)
- 19 April 2003
Nominee	Bola Tinubu	Funsho Williams
Party	AD	PDP
Running mate	Femi Pedro	Safurat Abdulkareem
Electoral vote	911,613	740,506
Governor before election
Bola Tinubu
AD
Elected Governor
Bola Tinubu
AD

The 2003 Lagos State gubernatorial election occurred on 19 April 2003. Incumbent Governor AD's Bola Tinubu won election for a second term, defeating PDP's Funsho Williams and four other candidates.

Bola Tinubu emerged unopposed in the AD gubernatorial primary after all the aspirants stepped down. He had Femi Pedro as his running mate.

Funsho Williams was the PDP candidate.

== Electoral system ==
The Governor of Lagos State is elected using the plurality voting system.

== Results ==
A total of six candidates registered with the Independent National Electoral Commission to contest in the election. AD Governor Bola Tinubu won re-election for a second term, defeating PDP's Funsho Williams and four minor party candidates.

The total number of registered voters in the state was 4,558,216.

Candidate	Party	Votes	%
Bola Tinubu	Alliance for Democracy (AD)		
Funsho Williams	People's Democratic Party		
Lanre Rasaq	All Nigeria Peoples Party (ANPP)		
Kofoworola Bucknor-Akerele	United Nigeria People's Party (UNPP)		
Adewunmi Abbass	NCP		
Dimejila Muren	ARP		
Total			
Registered voters/turnout		4,558,216	–
