= Isimi Lagos =

City project in Lagos, Nigeria

- City
- Location within Nigeria
- Coordinates: 6°37′17.544″N 3°55′55.38″E
- Country: Nigeria
- State: Lagos State
- LGA(s): Epe
- Founded: 2021

Government
  - City Planner: LandWey Investment Limited
- Time zone: WAT (UTC+1)
- Website: https://isimilagos.com/
- This project is currently under development

Isimi Lagos is a planned city of Lagos State, Nigeria, under construction in Epe Town. The new city is designed to house up to 10,000 residents, with a completion timeline set to 2030. The city covers a land area of over 300 hectares (3,000,000m²) and is developed by Landwey Investment Limited. The city's name, 'Isimi', means 'Peace of Mind' in Yoruba language.

== Overview ==
The design of the city ensures the topography of the whole Isimi Lagos will be largely retained to maintain its natural state, as revealed by Landwey CEO, Olawale Ayilara in a media statement. These designs include work, residential and recreational areas, as well as a Tech Valley and a Solar Farm.

=== Clusters ===
The living areas are known as known as clusters. The planned clusters are as follows:

- The Origin I
- The Village
- Grey Town
- The Emergence
- Green Life Colony

== Timeline ==
Earthworks for the project began in mid-2021 after it was announced earlier in the year. On April 12, 2022, LandWey unveiled the timeline for the project at a symposium held at the company's headquarters in Lagos. Construction began in early 2022 shortly after an event where their partnership with Zenith Construction Limited was announced. Later that year, plans were announced to launch a Tech Valley as part of its efforts to create an ecosystem that provides both residential and educational facilities for tech start-ups and enthusiasts. The Lagos State Government, in partnership with LandWey and MIT, commissioned the construction of the Senseable Lagos Lab in December 2022, in the Isimi Lagos Tech Valley, during the Lagos Future City Week.

In April 2023, construction of the Isimi Lagos Welcome Centre was completed. In the same month, LandWey signed a deal with Virtuitis Solaris, a renewable energy subsidiary, for the development of the proposed Isimi Lagos Solar Farm.
