= Odo Noforija =

Community in Lagos, Nigeria

Coordinates: 6°37′45″N 3°59′01″E

Noforija Epe, is a small community in the Epe local government area of Lagos State, Nigeria.

Landmarks in the area include the Lagos State University of Education, Procare Hospital, Proposed Yaba University of Technology, Ten X City Estate, Ontario by Dukia Afrika and SEED Estate, Toll Gate.

The traditional ruler is referred to as the Aladeshoyin of Odo-Noforija.
