= Ojikutu =

Ojikutu is a surname. Notable people with the surname include:

- Bayo Ojikutu (born 1971), Nigerian-American creative writer, novelist and university lecturer
- Bisola Ojikutu, American physician
- Sinatu Ojikutu (born 1946), former deputy governor of Lagos State
- Sanya Ojikutu (born 19**),

is an artist, cartoonist, collector and technologist.
