= Lateefat Okunnu =

Nigerian politician (born 1939)

Deputy Governor of Lagos State
- In office 1 July 1990 – 2 January 1992
- Governor: Raji Rasaki
- Preceded by: Rafiu Jafojo
- Succeeded by: Sinatu Ojikutu

Personal details
- Born: Lateefat Okunnu; 3 December 1939 (age 86)
- Occupation: Civil servant
- Known for: Deputy Governor of Lagos State

Lateefat Modupeola Okunnu (3 December 1939) is a Nigerian educationist, retired civil servant and administrator who was the first female Deputy governor of Nigeria and Deputy Governor of Lagos State from 1990 to 1992. She was caretaker chairman of the National Republican Convention in 1993.

Okunnu is a founding member of the Federation of Muslim Women's Associations in Nigeria (FOMWAN).

== Life ==
Lateefat Modupeola Okunnu was born in Lagos and educated at Ansarudeen Okepopo Primary School, Lagos Island, Methodist Girls' High School and Queens College, Yaba. She has a Bachelor of Arts degree in geography and earned a postgraduate diploma in education from the University of Lagos in 1968. From 1967 to 1970, Okunnu worked with University of Lagos as an assistant lecturer. Thereafter, she joined Lagos State Civil Service as an education officer. She was with the State government until 1980, after which she moved to the federal civil service as a principal secretary in the Federal Ministry of Agriculture. In 1986, she became a permanent secretary in the cabinet office. Okunnu was among the group of elite women who formed the Federation of Muslim Women's Associations in Nigeria. She was the pioneer vice president (amirah) of the organization and also head of the Lagos State chapter. She was involved in education matters within the Lagos State chapter of FOMWAN and encouraged the use of mosque grounds as crèche and also formation of education committees within mosques. In 1989, she became the president of FOMWAN.

In 1987, as a civil servant, Okunnu was member of the nine member committee inaugurated to review recommendations of the 1986 Political Bureau. In 1990, she was appointed Deputy Governor of Lagos, along with Pamela Sadauki of Kaduna State, the duo where the first female Deputy Governors in Nigeria.

== Early life and education ==
Lateefat Okunnu was born on December 3, 1939 into the royal Oyekan family of Lagos. She received her first education at Ansar-ud-deen Primary School Okepopo (1945-1952) and Methodist Girls high School Lagos (1953-1958), followed by Queens College Onikan, Lagos (1959-1960). She then went on to University of California Los Angeles UCLA in (1972) and also attended the Royal Institute of Public Administration in London in (1978).

Lateefat Okunnu married a Federal Commissioner for Works during the civil war era which equalizes to a Minister of Works today. She married Alhaji Lateef Olufemi Okunnu and they had but one daughter together, Justice L.A Okunnu.
