= 1983 Lagos State gubernatorial election =

1983 gubernatorial election in Lagos State, Nigeria

- 13 August 1983
Nominee	Lateef Jakande
Party	UPN
Governor before election
Lateef Jakande
UPN
Elected Governor
Lateef Jakande
UPN

The 1983 Lagos State gubernatorial election occurred on 13 August 1983. UPN candidate Lateef Jakande won the election.

== Results ==
Lateef Jakande representing UPN won the election. The election held on 13 August 1983.
