= Christopher Odetunde =

Nigerian academic

Christopher Bode Odetunde

Vice Chancellor of the Augustine University Ilara
- Incumbent
- Assumed office October 2020

Personal details
- Born: Kwara State, Nigeria

Christopher Odetunde is a professor of Aeronautical and Mechanical Engineering. He has held various position in the industry and academia while in the United States and also in Nigeria. He is the former Dean of the Faculty of Engineering at the Kwara State University, Malete and the past Vice Chancellor of Augustine University.

== Education ==
Odetunde had his secondary education at St. John's College, Kaduna from 1964 to 1968, where he majored in the Arts. His switch to science subjects came at his A Levels, which he passed between 1969 and 1972.

He then went on to study Aeronautical Engineering at Embry-Riddle Aeronautical University in the United States. He earned other degrees at Iowa State University, Texas A& M University and Southeastern Institute of Technology, Alabama. He has a Bachelor of Science degree in Aeronautical Engineering, a Master of Science in Aeronautical/Mechanical Engineering and in Project Management, as well and a Doctoral degree in Aerospace Engineering.

== Career ==
Odetunde became Vice-Chancellor of Augustine University on 5 October 2020. Until his appointment, he was the former Dean of the Faculty of Engineering at the Kwara State University, Malete.
