= Jubril Ayinla =

Former Chief of Naval Staff

Vice admiral Jubril Ayinla

Chief of Naval Staff
- In office 1998–1999
- Preceded by: Rear Admiral Okhai Michael Akhigbe
- Succeeded by: Vice Admiral Victor Ombu

Minister of Health
- In office 1997–1998
- Preceded by: Ihechukwu Madubuike
- Succeeded by: Timothy Menakaya

Personal details
- Born: Jubril; 10 December 1948 (age 77) Babura
- Occupation: Chief of Naval Staff

Military service
- Allegiance: Nigeria
- Branch/service: Nigeria Navy

Jubril Ayinla (born 10 December 1948) is a retired Nigerian Navy vice admiral and public administrator who served as Chief of Naval Staff from 1998 to 1999 and held ministerial roles during the 1990s.

== Early and education ==
Jubril Ayinla was born on 10 December 1948 in Babura, which at the time was part of Kano State but is now in Jigawa State. He began his early education at Edward Blyden Memorial School in Lagos between 1953 and 1954, before moving to Holy Trinity School in Kano, where he studied from 1955 to 1960. He later attended Igbo Union Secondary School in Kano from 1961 to 1965.

In 1966, Ayinla enrolled at the Nigerian Defence Academy and, four years later, was commissioned as a substantive lieutenant. His career also included advanced training abroad, where he studied at the Indian Naval School, now the Indian Naval Academy, from 1968 to 1969, and later at the United States Naval War College between 1988 and 1989.

== Naval career ==
Early in his career, he was commissioned as a substantive lieutenant in 1970. He served as Watch Keeping Officer aboard NNS Kaduna and later as Commander of NNS Enugu and NNS Ibadan from 1971 to 1972. Between 1973 and 1985, he held roles such as Navigation Officer, Commanding Officer of NNS Ruwanyaro and NNS Aradu, Executive Officer on NNS Beecroft, Director of Signals, and Chief Instructor at the Naval Faculty and Staff College in Jaji. He progressed to higher leadership roles, including Director of Plans at Naval Headquarters, Chief of Personnel, Commander of Naval Ordnance Corps, and Flag Officer Commanding Eastern Naval Command (1991–1994; 1996).

=== Retirement and philanthropy ===
Following his retirement from active service in 1999, by the new political dispensation ushering in Olushegun Obasanjo as civilian president, Ayinla became active in philanthropy. He chairs the Jubrila Ayinla Foundation, founded in 1988, which focuses on empowering the less privileged through programmes in education, poverty alleviation, sports, and providing services for the visually impaired. He also serves on the Board of Trustees of the Oba Adedotun Gbadebo Foundation.

== Honors ==
His decorations include the Grand Commander of the Order of the Niger and several service medals, such as the Force Service Star, Meritorious Service Star, Distinguished Service Star, Defence Service Medal, Republic Medal (1998), General Service Medal, Silver Jubilee Medal, and Distinguished Service Order. He is known for hobbies such as chess and lawn tennis.

In 2023, he was inducted into the Nigeria Chess Federation Hall of Fame as one of the pioneers of the game in Nigeria.

== Personal life ==
Ayinla married Jemilat Abimbola Oguntola in 1973, and they have four children: two sons and two daughters.
