= Rafiu Jafojo =

Nigerian politician (1935–2016)

Deputy Governor of Lagos State
- In office 1 October 1979 – 31 December 1983
- Governor: Lateef Jakande
- Preceded by: Office Established
- Succeeded by: Lateefat Okunnu

Personal details
- Born: 6 December 1935
- Died: 23 April 2016 (aged 80)

Rafiu Jafojo (6 December 1935 – 23 April 2016) was a Nigerian politician. He was the deputy governor of Lagos State from 1979 to 1983. He was the first elected Deputy Governor of Lagos State

== Early life and career ==
He worked as a building inspector with the Ikeja Town Planning Authority. He left for England In 1961 where he got a National Certificate in Building Engineering from Hackney Technical College in 1966 and Higher National Certificate from Brixon School of Engineering. In 1969, he obtained an Advanced Certificate in Building Technology from Northern Polytechnic, Holloway (now University of North London) in 1970.

On 1 October 1979, Jafojo, alongside Lateef Jakande was sworn in as the first democratically elected deputy governor of Lagos.

== Memorial ==
The Rafiu Jafojo Park in Shasha Alimosho, Lagos was commissioned in December 2017 in Rafiu's memory.
