= Tim Menakaya =

Nigerian physician and politician

Timothy Ndubisi Menakaya

Minister of Health
- In office 1999–2001
- Preceded by: Jubril Ayinla
- Succeeded by: Alphonsus Nwosu

Personal details
- Born: 27 May 1934 (age 92) Umunya

Timothy Ndubisi Menakaya (born 27 May 1934) is a Nigerian physician and politician who served as Minister of Health from 1999 to 2001.

== Early life and education ==
Menakaya was born on 27 May 1934 and hails from Umunya, in present-day Oyi Local Government Area of Anambra State. He attended Dennis Memorial Grammar School in Onitsha and later earned a degree in medicine and surgery at the University of Bologna, Italy, in 1964. He is a fellow of the West African College of Physicians.

== Career ==
Menakaya practiced medicine in Italy and the United Kingdom before returning to Nigeria in 1966, where he served as a medical officer in Eastern Nigeria. He served in the Biafran Army during the Nigerian Civil War. He worked with the Roman Catholic Archdiocese of Onitsha at Holy Rosary Maternity Hospital and St. Charles Borromeo Hospital. In 1974, he founded Menax Hospital in Onitsha. Menakaya held leadership positions in various industrial, educational and healthcare boards.

Menakaya served as Nigeria's Minister of Health from 1999 to 2001, during the tenure of President Olusegun Obasanjo. He worked on various health reforms and initiatives aimed at improving the country's healthcare systems, including the roll back malaria programme and the National Health Insurance Scheme. He also expanded public health awareness efforts and investigated claims of a vaccine cure for HIV/AIDS.

== Awards and recognition ==
Menakaya's contributions to the medical field have earned him several honours, including the Officer of the Order of the Federal Republic (OFR) and various awards from medical associations and civic organisations.

== Personal life ==
Menakaya is married with children including Dr. Chichi Menakaya.
