= Funsho Williams =

Nigerian politician

Anthony Olufunso Williams

Personal details
- Born: Anthony Olufunso Williams; 9 May 1948 Lagos, Lagos State, Nigeria
- Died: 27 July 2006 (aged 58) Dolphin Estate, Ikoyi, Lagos, Nigeria
- Cause of death: Assassination by stabbing
- Party: People's Democratic Party
- Education: St Gregory's College, Lagos; University of Lagos.

Anthony Olufunsho Williams (9 May 1948 – 27 July 2006) was a Nigerian politician from Lagos State, who served as former Commissioner under Colonel Olagunsoye Oyinlola, the then military administrator of the state. He was assassinated on 27 July 2006, at age 58.

== Early life ==
Williams attended the St. Paul's Catholic school at Ebute Metta and later St Gregory's College, Lagos. In 1968, he studied at the University of Lagos, attaining a degree in civil engineering. He then went on to attend the New Jersey Institute of Technology for his Master's degree.

== Civil service career ==
In 1974, Williams returned to Nigeria and joined the Lagos State civil service. He spent the next 17 years working on construction projects in Lagos State. Approximately 70% of the roads and bridges were built under his stewardship. Williams was a Permanent Secretary by the time he left the civil service in 1991.

He went into business, but he shortly returned to public service, as a Lagos state Commissioner under Colonel Olagunsoye Oyinlola's Military Administratorship.

== Political career ==
In the mid-1990s, Williams decided to enter into politics in order that he could formulate policy, rather than just carry it out. He first joined the United Nigeria Congress Party (UNCP), but after the suspicious death of its leader, General Sani Abacha he moved to the Alliance for Democracy (AD).

After a short time, Williams again switched parties, this time to the People's Democratic Party (PDP).They had won the 2003 elections under the leadership of President Olusegun Obasanjo.

Williams had stood twice before in the Lagos State Governorship (Gubernatorial) election. At the time of his death he was hoping to be nominated as the PDP Gubernatorial candidate for Lagos State. He had vowed to wrest control of the wealthy state from the Alliance for Democracy Party.

== Positions ==
Williams held directorships in several companies:

- Julius Berger Nigeria Plc
- Cappa and D'Alberto Plc
- Ajaokuta Steel Company
- Chairman of the board of directors of the National Maritime Authority

== Assassination ==
On 27 July 2006, Williams was found bound, strangled, and stabbed to death at his home in Dolphin Estate, Ikoyi, an exclusive and wealthy neighborhood in Lagos. He was 58 years old.

=== Burial ===
Williams was laid to rest at the Victoria Court Cemetery, Lagos. He was survived by his wife, Hilda, and four children.

=== Aftermath ===
On 28 July 2006, two people were arrested in connection with his assassination. One was his campaign manager, and the other was a senator and former Works Minister Kingsley Adeseye Ogunlewe. Ogunlewe was also hoping to be the PDP Gubernatorial candidate.

== Memorial ==
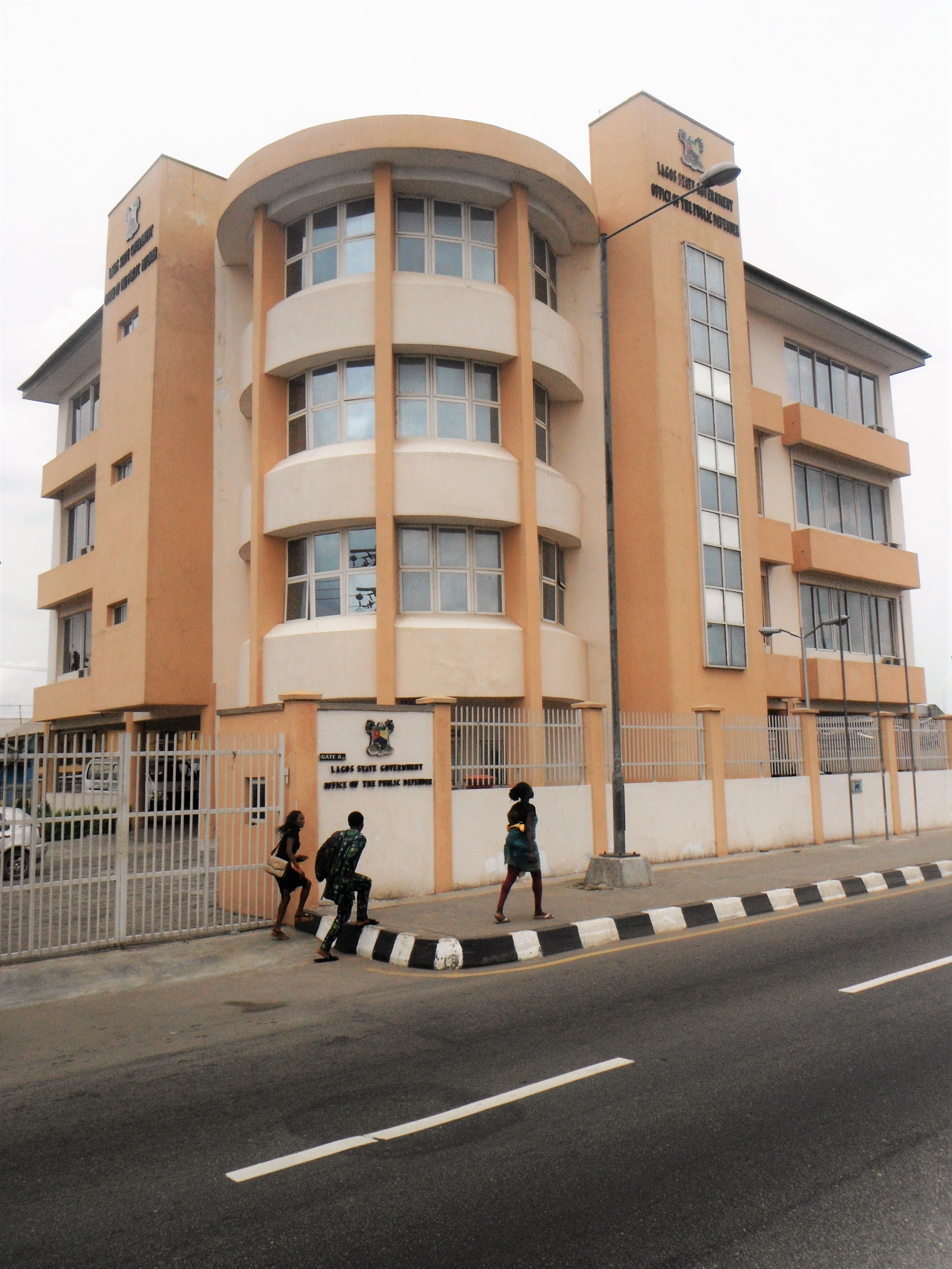
stadium hotel bus stop, funsho Williams avenue, Lagos, Nigeria

On 26 February 2007, approximately seven months after the murder incident, the then Lagos State governor, Governor Bola Ahmed Tinubu in honor of the late iconic character, renamed the longest and the popular Western Avenue highway in Lagos to Funsho William Avenue. Yet, it is still known to most Lagosians as Western Avenue highway.
