= Methodist Girls' High School (Lagos) =

Secondary school in Nigeria

- Yaba, Lagos; Nigeria

Information
- Religious affiliation: Methodism
- Established: 1879; 147 years ago
- Sister school: Methodist Boys' High School
- Gender: Girls

Methodist Girls' High School is a secondary school for girls located in Yaba, Lagos, Nigeria. It was established in 1879 and affiliated with the Methodist Church. It is the first female secondary school and the third oldest secondary school in Nigeria. It is the sister school of Methodist Boys High School.

== Alumni ==
- Chief (Mrs) HID Awolowo, née Adelana (1915-2015), businesswomen and politician.
- Professor Ibiyinka Fuwape, theoretical physicist.
- Alhaja Lateefat Okunnu, née Oyekan (born 1939), civil servant and administrator.
- Chief (Mrs) Folake Solanke SAN, née Odulate (born 1932), lawyer and administrator.
- Princess Taiwo Ajai-Lycett OON (born 1941), actress, journalist and activist.
