= List of governors of Lagos State =

This is a list of administrators and governors of Lagos State. Lagos State was formed on 27 May 1967 from Lagos Colony province and Lagos Federal Territory. The Government of Lagos State is responsible for the effective coordination of all government activities for Lagos State.

Name	Title	Took office	Left office	Party	Notes
Brigadier Mobolaji Johnson	Governor	27 May 1967	July 1975	Military	
Commodore Adekunle Lawal	Governor	July 1975	1977	Military	
Commodore Ndubuisi Kanu	Governor	1977	July 1978	Military	
Commodore Ebitu Ukiwe	Governor	July 1978	October 1979	Military	
Alhaji Lateef Jakande	Governor	October 1979	December 1983	Unity Party of Nigeria (UPN)	
Air Commodore Gbolahan Mudasiru	Governor	January 1984	August 1986	Military	
Navy Captain Mike Akhigbe	Governor	August 1986	July 1988	Military	
Brigadier General Raji Rasaki	Governor	July 1988	January 1992	Military	
Sir Michael Otedola	Governor	January 1992	November 1993	National Republican Convention (NRC)	
Colonel Olagunsoye Oyinlola	Governor	9 December 1993	22 August 1996	Military	
Colonel Mohammed Buba Marwa	Governor	22 Aug 1996	29 May 1999	Military	
Asiwaju Bola Tinubu	Governor	29 May 1999	29 May 2007	Alliance for Democracy (AD)	
Mr Babatunde Fashola	Governor	29 May 2007	29 May 2015	Action Congress of Nigeria (ACN)	
Mr Akinwunmi Ambode	Governor	29 May 2015	29 May 2019	All Progressives Congress (APC)	
Mr Babajide Sanwo-Olu	Governor	29 May 2019	Incumbent	All Progressives Congress (APC)	

== See also ==
- Governors of the Lagos Colony (category)
- Nigeria
- States of Nigeria
- List of state governors of Nigeria
- Timeline of Lagos city
- Oba of Lagos
