= Oluwo fish market =

Market in Epe, Lagos State, Nigeria

The Oluwo fish market also known as the Epe fish market is the biggest fish market in Lagos state. It is located in Epe, Lagos State, Nigeria. The Oluwo fish market traders are mostly women because of the chain of distribution which allow the fishermen mostly men to catch the fishes and deliver them to the trader who in turn sell them to the retailers.

== Oluwo Fish Market ==
This strategically located fish market is the biggest in Lagos and reported to be as old as the city of Epe even though the date of the official commissioning of market is dated 10 November 1989. The name of the market is derived from the name of the family that sold the land it occupies to the state government - Oluwo family while "Chief" that most locals call it (the market), is the traditional title of the Oluwo's.

The market is said to have been initially located at the Marina front, (a short distance from the present abode) before it became too small to occupy the number of traders influx. For anyone that have heard of Epe town being referred to as the "fish basket of the state", the root of the name lies in the significance of this fish Market as a major producer and exporter of fish to various parts of its parent state - Lagos and Nigeria at large.

== Oluwo Fish Market as a wet market in Lagos State ==
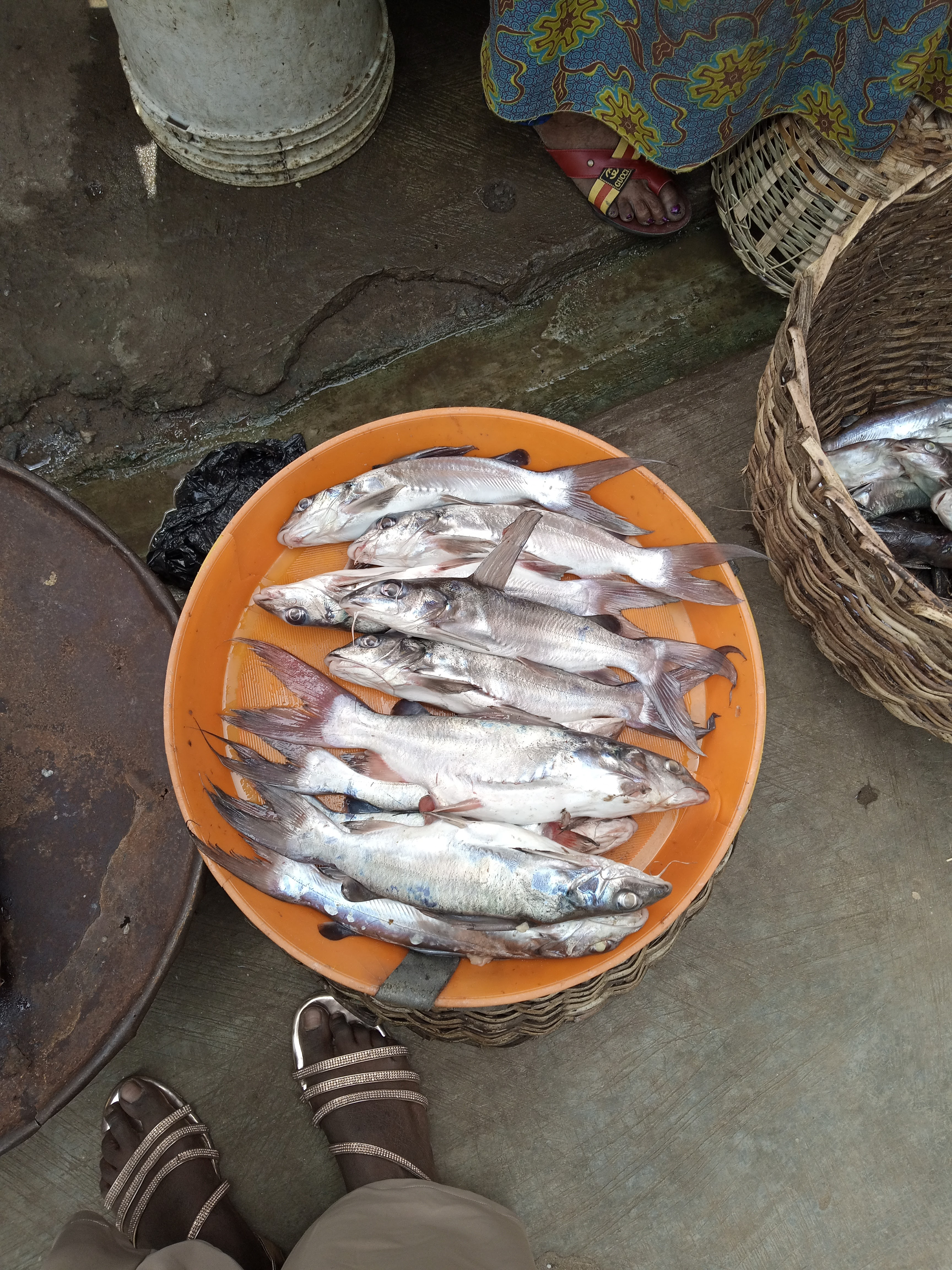
Eja Obokun

The category of most food items sold at the market makes it fall into category of Wet market.Fish as well as wildlife, typically known as "bushmeat" are common sights at Oluwo Fish market. The animals are either brought-in live or dead and are also sold in the best form that the buyer prefers., However, the COVID-19 virus outbreak created another dimension to the existence of Oluwo Fish market in Lagos, as there are high concerns about wet markets being the hotspot for zoonotic diseases that causes virus like COVID-19. This led to the brief closure of the fish market by the Lagos State Ministry of Health in order to reduce the possibility of another zoonotic disease outbreak in the state.

== Rehabilitation of the Fish Market ==
In 2021, the Federal Government of Nigeria started the rehabilitation of the Epe fish market to meet international standard, the improvement was designed to give the Epe market to meet international standard, improve earnings and encourage commercial activities thrive.
