= Michael Otedola =

Nigerian politician (1926–2014) My Grandfather factual

Michael Otedola KSS

9th Governor of Lagos State
- In office 2 January 1992 – 17 November 1993
- Deputy: Sinatu Ojikutu
- Preceded by: Raji Rasaki
- Succeeded by: Olagunsoye Oyinlola

Personal details
- Born: Michael Agbolade Otedola; 16 July 1926 Epe, British Nigeria (now Epe, Lagos State, Nigeria)
- Died: 5 May 2014 (aged 87) Epe, Lagos State, Nigeria
- Party: National Republican Convention (NRC)
- Children: Femi Otedola (son)
- Awards: Knight of the Order of St. Sylvester (1974)

Michael Agbolade Otedola KSS (16 July 1926 – 5 May 2014) was a Nigerian politician who served as governor of Lagos State during the Nigerian Third Republic.

He was born on the 16 July 1926 into a Muslim family at Odoragunsin, Epe Local Government Area of Lagos State. He died on 5 May 2014 at his residence in his home town of Epe, Lagos.

== Early life ==
After moving to Lagos to pursue his education he won a scholarship to study journalism at the Regent Street Polytechnic in London where he graduated in 1958.

He began his career as a teacher before working as a reporter at the St. Pancras Chronicle, then as a reporter and later sub-editor at The Guardian and The Times in England.

== Politics ==
On his return to Nigeria in 1959 he became an Information Officer in the Western Nigeria government, and while in this post he was appointed the Editor of the Western Nigeria Illustrated. In 1961 he moved into public relations, working for Western Nigeria Television/Western Broadcasting Service (1961–1964) and Mobil Oil Group of Companies (1964–1977), continuing as a consultant to Mobil after leaving the company.

He was elected governor of Lagos State from 1992 to 1993 on the platform of the National Republican Convention (NRC), leaving office when General Sani Abacha came to power. His administration facilitated establishing the Yaba College of Technology campus in Epe, his home town.

After leaving office, he continued his career as a writer, a consultant holding positions on the boards of various businesses, and a philanthropist. In February 2010 ThisDay newspaper announced that he was among 15 eminent Nigerians who had won Lifetime Achievement Awards. His son Femi Otedola became the billionaire owner of Nigerian oil giant Zenon Petroleum and Gas Limited. The Michael Otedola College of Primary Education was named after him after his demise.

As a former governor of Lagos State from 1992 to 1993 elected on the platform of the National Republican Convention (NRC), he is a successor of TOS Benson as a political opponent to the AG/ACN political movement to have been honored by a shared Eyo Festival the 27th dec. 2025.

== See also ==
- Femi Otedola
- Temi Otedola
