= 1992 Nigerian Senate elections in Lagos State =

1992 Nigerian Senate election in Lagos State

The 1992 Nigerian Senate election in Lagos State was held on July 4, 1992, to elect members of the Nigerian Senate to represent Lagos State. Kofoworola Bucknor representing Lagos Central, Bola Tinubu representing Lagos West and Anthony Adefuye representing Lagos East all won on the platform of the Social Democratic Party.

== Overview ==
Affiliation	Party		Total
Affiliation	SDP	NRC	Total
Before Election			3
After Election	3	0	3

== Summary ==
District	Incumbent	Party	Elected Senator	Party
Lagos Central			Kofoworola Bucknor	SDP
Lagos West			Bola Tinubu	SDP
Lagos East			Anthony Adefuye	SDP

== Results ==
=== Lagos Central ===
The election was won by Kofoworola Bucknor of the Social Democratic Party.

1992 Nigerian Senate election in Lagos State
Party	Candidate	Votes	%
SDP	Kofoworola Bucknor		
Total votes			
SDP hold			

=== Lagos West ===
The election was won by Bola Tinubu of the Social Democratic Party.

1992 Nigerian Senate election in Lagos State
Party	Candidate	Votes	%
SDP	Bola Tinubu		
Total votes			
SDP hold			

=== Lagos East ===
The election was won by Anthony Adefuye of the Social Democratic Party.

1992 Nigerian Senate election in Lagos State
Party	Candidate	Votes	%
SDP	Anthony Adefuye		
Total votes			
SDP hold			
