= 1999 Lagos State gubernatorial election =

1999 gubernatorial election in Lagos State, Nigeria

- 9 January 1999
Nominee	Bola Tinubu	Dapo Sarumi
Party	AD	PDP
Running mate	Kofoworola Bucknor	Ademola Adeniji-Adele
Popular vote	841,732	184,900
Governor before election
Buba Marwa
Elected Governor
Bola Tinubu
AD

The 1999 Lagos State gubernatorial election occurred in Nigeria on 9 January 1999. The AD nominee Bola Tinubu won the election defeating the PDP candidate.

Bola Tinubu emerged AD candidate.

== Electoral system ==
The Governor of Lagos State is elected using the plurality voting system.

== Primary election ==
=== AD primary ===
The AD primary election was won by Bola Tinubu.

== Results ==
The total number of registered voters in the state was 4,093,143. Total number of votes cast was 1,184,372, while number of valid votes was 1,149,375. Rejected votes were 34,997.

Candidate	Party	Votes	%
Bola Tinubu	Alliance for Democracy	841,732	81.99
Dapo Sarumi	People's Democratic Party	184,900	18.01
Total		1,026,632	100.00
Valid votes		1,026,632	96.70
Invalid/blank votes		34,997	3.30
Total votes		1,061,629	100.00
Registered voters/turnout		4,093,143	25.94
Source: Nigeria World, IFES, Semantics Scholar
