= The Fish Statue, Epe =

Sculpture in Lagos, Nigeria

Coordinates: 6.5865°N 3.9514°E

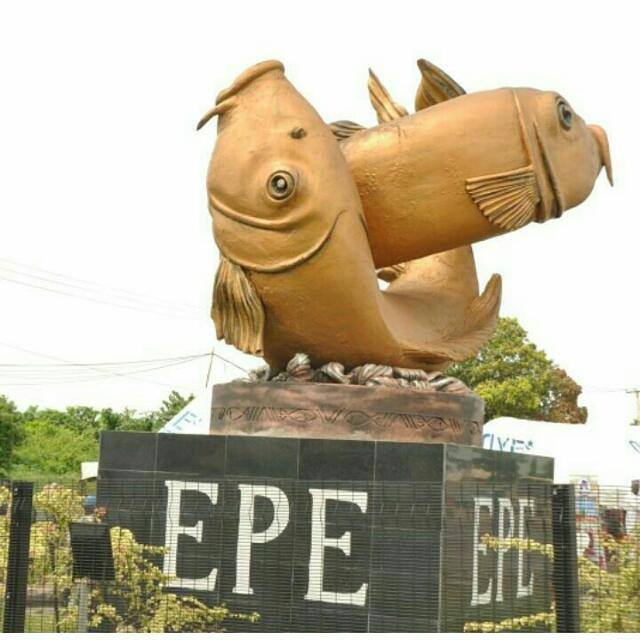
The Giant Fish Statue

The Fish Statue, officially referred to as The Fish, Epe, is a sculpture of two giant fish, erected at Lekki-Epe T-Junction in Epe, Lagos by the Lagos State Government. The sculpture is mounted on a large rectangular plinth with the word "EPE" on its side.

Unveiled on November 8, 2017 by the then Governor of Lagos State, Akinwunmi Ambode, the sculptor Hamza Attah cited cultural significance of Epe as a home of fishing activities and that the Monument portrayed contemporary Epe as the export point for fish in Lagos, noting that fishing is the main occupation of indigenes.

"The Fish statue is a celebration of communal economic activities centered on the vast potentials available in the coastal area, such as fishing, marine transportation, and job opportunities," Ambode explained.

Earlier in his remarks, Hon. Doyin Adesanya, Chairman of Epe Local Government Area, stated that the placement of the monument at the Lekki-Epe T-Junction not only symbolized Epe as the fish basket of Lagos State, but also of the nation.
