= Ekundayo Opaleye =

Nigerian general and politician (1946–2023)

Major General Ekundayo B. Opaleye

Governor of Ondo State
- In office 26 August 1986 – 17 December 1987
- Preceded by: Michael Okhai Akhigbe
- Succeeded by: Raji Alagbe Rasaki

Personal details
- Born: 7 April 1946 Abeokuta, Colony and Protectorate of Nigeria
- Died: 18 November 2023 (aged 77) Abeokuta, Ogun State, Nigeria

Military service
- Branch/service: Nigerian Army
- Rank: Major General

Ekundayo B. Opaleye (7 April 1946 – 18 November 2023) was a Nigerian general and politician who was Governor of Ondo State, from August 1986 to December 1987, during the military regime of general Ibrahim Babangida.

== Military career ==
Colonel Opaleye was a member of a Special Military Tribunal set up in 1986 to try officers accused of plotting a coup against Babangida in December 1985. In August 1986 he was appointed governor of Ondo State, holding office until December 1987. General Opaleye was appointed commander of the OAU Neutral Military Organization Group (NMOG) set up in 1991 to enforce a cease fire between the Tutsi-led Rwandan Patriotic Front (RPF) and the Hutu-dominated Rwandan government. NMOG had the limited mandate of creating a buffer zone between the rebels and the government troops. In 1993 NMOG was integrated into the United Nations Assistance Mission for Rwanda (UNAMIR). Major-general Opaleye played a big role in the conclusion of the ARUSHA talks that let to the Peace Agreement signed on 4 August 1993.

== Later career ==
After retiring from the army, Opaleye was made an Owu Erunmu chief (Balogun Erunmu – Erunmu Owu's highest ranking war chieftain) by the Oluroko of Erunmu Owu, Honourable Chief Aremu Olugbolahan Ijaola. This made him a traditional war chief in Erunmu, and by extension, a secondary cabinet member in the Owu Kingdom. He was involved in controversy when the Owu monarch, Oba Adegboyega Dosumu, appointed sixteen new Obas, whom the Ogun State government refused to recognize. In October 2009 Opaleye said the Owu Kingdom would not reverse the appointments since they were not contrary to any laws.

== Personal life and death ==
Ekundayo B. Opaleye was born on 7 April 1946. He died from a heart attack on 18 November 2023, at the age of 77.
