= Lateef Jakande =

Nigerian journalist and politician (1929–2021)

Governor of Lagos State
- In office 1 October 1979 – 31 December 1983
- Deputy: Rafiu Jafojo
- Preceded by: Ebitu Ukiwe
- Succeeded by: Gbolahan Mudasiru

Minister of Works
- In office November 1993 – March 1995
- President: Sani Abacha
- Succeeded by: Abdulkareem Adisa

Personal details
- Born: Lateef Kayode Jakande; 23 July 1929 Lagos Island, Lagos, British Nigeria (now Lagos Island, Lagos, Lagos State, Nigeria)
- Died: 11 February 2021 (aged 91)
- Occupation: Journalist

Lateef Kayode Jakande Yoruba pronunciation (23 July 1929 – 11 February 2021) was a Nigerian journalist and politician who served as governor of Lagos State from 1979 to 1983, and later Minister of Works under the Sani Abacha military regime.

== Background ==
Lateef Kayode Jakande was born in the Epetedo area of Lagos Island, Lagos State on July 29, 1929. Both parents are from Omu-Aran, Kwara State. He had his primary school education at the Lagos Public School at Enu-Owa, Lagos Island, then at Bunham Memorial Methodist School, Port Harcourt (1934–43). He studied at King's College, Lagos in 1943, and then enrolled at Ilesha Grammar School in 1945, where he edited a literary paper called The Quarterly Mirror.

In 1949, Jakande began a career in journalism first with the Daily Service and then in 1953 joining the Nigerian Tribune. In 1956 he was appointed editor-in-chief of the Tribune by the owner Chief Obafemi Awolowo.

After leaving the Tribune in 1975, Jakande established John West Publications and began to publish The Lagos News. He served as the first president of the Newspaper Proprietors Association of Nigeria (NPAN).

== Governor of Lagos State ==
Encouraged by Awolowo, he ran for election as executive governor of Lagos State in 1979, on the Unity Party of Nigeria platform. He defeated his opponents, Adeniran Ogunsanya of Nigerian People's Party (NPP) and Ladega Adeniji Adele of National Party of Nigeria with a total of 559,070 votes and was subsequently sworn in as Governor. His administration was effective and open and implemented the cardinal policies of his party. He introduced housing and educational programs targeting the poor, building new neighbourhood primary and secondary schools and providing free primary and secondary education. He established the Lagos State University and the Nigerian Institute of Journalism, Lagos House, is named after him. Jakande's government constructed over 30,000 housing units. Some of the housing units include low cost estates at Amuwo-Odofin, Ijaiye, Dolphin, Oke-Afa, Ije, Abesan, Iponri, Ipaja, Abule Nla, Epe, Anikantamo, Surulere, Iba, Ikorodu, Badagry. To fund some of the projects, Jakande increased the tenement rates and price of plots of land in affluent areas of Victoria Island and Lekki Peninsula and the processing fees for lottery, pools and gaming licenses. He also completed the construction of the General Hospital in Gbagada and Ikorodu and built about 20 health centres within the state. As governor, he established 23 local government councils which were later disbanded by the military. He also started a metroline project to facilitate mass transit. The project was halted when the military seized power on 31 December 1983.

== Later career ==
After the military take-over in 1983, Jakande was charged, prosecuted and convicted of treason, although later he was pardoned. After being freed, he accepted the position of Minister of Works under the Sani Abacha military regime, which earned him some criticism. He claimed that he had accepted the post under pressure from M. K. O. Abiola and other progressive leaders. In a later interview, he said he had no regrets about the decision to serve. However, his association with Abacha handicapped his career in politics after the restoration of democracy in 1999.

Alhaji Lateef Kayode Jakande became a senior member of All Nigeria Peoples Party (ANPP) when the UNPP and All People's Party (APP) merged. In June 2002, he was "suspended" by a faction of the ANPP loyal to Chief Lanre Razaq. Jakande was the first chairman of the Action Party of Nigeria (APN) when it was formed in November 2006. In May 2009, he was reported to be engaged in a struggle for control of the party with his former ally, Dr. Adegbola Dominic.

Many prominent people attended his 75th birthday celebration. At this event, former Governor of Lagos State Bola Ahmed Tinubu said Jakande was worth celebrating for his life of consistent commitment to public service. Former Imo State Governor Achike Udenwa said Jakande's life and times epitomised "resilience, positive audacity, bravery and bravado, and a knack for excellence."

== Later life and death ==
L. Jakande died in Lagos on the February 11, 2021. His body was interred at Vaults and Gardens Cemetery, Ikoyi, Lagos state on Friday February 12, 2021. He was one of the four Yoruba Lagosians to be honored by an EYO FESTIVAL organised 27th dec. 2025 for his involvement in Lagos Development as a governor. He is though an outsider among the past honored celebrities because his family was not originally from Lagos Island but from Kwara state. But it was also the first time a non-EKO indigene was honored with Sir Michael Otedola a yoruba EPE citizen. Only Mrs Tinubu, Chief Abibatu Mogaji, was from an Eko family from the very inner center of Lagos Island. The Yoruba singer K1 De Ultimate composed a song in her honour in 2013. The fourth celebrated personality Brigadier-General Mobolaji Olufunsho Johnson was also a true Lagosian. but of Saro origin coming from the Saro part of Lagos near Marina. He was the son of Joshua Motola Johnson and his wife, Gbemisola Johnson (née Dudley-Coker). It is a new opportunity after 8 years without Eyo Festival, after past honored leaders were only from Eko-Lagos, for the ACN governor to bring all Lagosians together in the building of a Lagostatism identity, broader than an eko-yoruba identity, but politically relevant for the whole Lagos State from Badagry (west) to Epe (east) including Ikorurdu ; it has to be a new Yoruba pan-Lagosian identity build from all political background other than AG/ACN. It started with the Eyo for the NCNC TOS Benson and now with the former first (military) governor of Lagos State, Mobolaji Olufunsho Johnson.

== See also ==
- Timeline of Lagos, 1980s
- Lateef Raji
