= Michael Otedola College of Primary Education =

Public university of education in Nigeria

Coordinates: 6.62621°N 3.98576°E

- Motto: Professional Excellence
- Type: Public
- Established: 1994
- Provost: Ass. Prof. Nosiru Olajide Onibon
- Students: 4,000
- Location: Epe, Lagos State, Nigeria
- Website: www.mocped.edu.ng

Lagos State University of Education

Lagos State University of Education (Lasued) formerly Michael Otedola College of Primary Education, formerly Lagos State College of Primary Education was known as MOCPED, is the first specialized college of primary education in Nigeria.

It also runs a degree program in affiliation with Ekiti State University and University of Ibadan

== History ==
Pursuant to the new National Policy on Education, which among other things stipulates the Nigeria Certification in Education (NCE) as the basic qualification for teaching in Nigeria by the year 2000, coupled with the need to provide functional and qualitative education predicated upon well-trained and sound professional man power to the citizenry of the state, the Lagos State Government in December 1994, established the Lagos State College of Primary Education (LACOPED) for pre service and in service training and certification of graduates for the Primary School system. The college was renamed Michael Otedola College of Primary Education (MOCPED) in April 2007.

MOCPED, situated in Noforija near Epe, in the Epe Local Government Area of the State, is the first Tertiary Institution in Nigeria that anticipated the need for training the manpower for the⁣⁣ Universal Basic Education System.

The college formally took off on December 1, 1994, at the Government Guest House, Epe with the appointment of the Provost and three other Principal Officers, by the Provisional Governing Council. Therefore, the college moved to its permanent site at Noforija, Epe.

The enabling edict, conditions of service for Junior and Senior Staff and the College Master Plan subsequently came into being.

After extensive consultant with the National Commission for Colleges of Education (NCCE), the college commenced its academic programmes in May, 1995 with 82 pioneering students in three PRE-NCE programme and less than 100 academic and non-academic staff as well as two (2) buildings.

Regular academic activities for the NCE programmes commenced in November 1995 with 182 students, at the permanent site of the college in Noforija, Epe.

The college runs National Certificate in Education Programme and is in affiliation with University of Ibadan's Degree programme in Education.

== College Objectives ==
The Michael Otedola College of Primary Education (MOCPED) is established to:

⦁ Provide courses of institution leading to National Certificate of Education (Primary) diploma and other distinctions in Primary Education and such related studies as may be prescribed; ⦁ Provide special training courses in educational and related courses, whether leading to College distinctions or not for such persons as may be prescribed, taking into account at all times the requirements of both the Federal and State Ministries of Education; ⦁ Provide an adequate supply of well qualified non-graduate teachers in accordance with the requirements of both the Federal and State Ministries of Education; ⦁ Conduct research with particular reference to education; ⦁ Arrange conferences, seminars, courses, study groups and for the purpose of improving instructions and learning in the Lagos State School system; develop and propagate a professional code and inculcate in its students the ethics of the profession; ⦁ Perform such other functions as may be conferred on it by this Law.
