= Sinatu Ojikutu =

Nigerian politician (born 1946)

Alhaja Sinatu Aderoju Ojikutu

Deputy Governor of Lagos State
- In office 2 January 1992 – 17 November 1993
- Governor: Michael Otedola
- Preceded by: Lateefat Okunnu
- Succeeded by: Kofoworola Bucknor

Personal details
- Born: 1946 (age 79–80)
- Known for: Former Deputy Governor of Lagos State

Alhaja Sinatu Aderoju Ojikutu is a former deputy governor of Lagos State from 1992 to 1993. She was deputy governor to Michael Otedola until a military takeover government in 1993.

== Early life and education ==
Sinatu Aderoju Ojikutu was born in Ekiti State, where she had her primary education. She left Ekiti after primary six for Lagos. She attended Our Lady of Apostle secondary school in Ijebu Ode. From Our Lady of Apostle, she attended Ilesha Grammar School to complete her secondary school.

== Career ==
She was an executive director at the Nigerian Bank for Commerce and Industry. She was the first female to be appointed to such a position. She was then secretary to the Lagos State Transport Corporation. Sir Michael Otedola selected her as running mate under the umbrella of National Republican Convention and she then became the deputy governor of Lagos State after their election victory in 1992. After the military coup in 1993, they were removed from office.

== Controversy ==
In 2013, Alhaja Sinatu and her son, Samson were accused of defrauding a man of 130 million naira for a parcel of land along Admiralty Way in Lekki, Lagos State. The land was sold to an unnamed man who paid the money to her account only to find out that the land belonged to one Mr Afolabi. According to Police statement, she admitted the crime but confessed that it was a genuine mistake of plot identification. She refunded the sum of 50 million naira to the complainant and promised to refund the balance when she disposed her two properties she had put up for sale. In an interview with The Punch, she stated that the land belonged to her late husband.
