= Augustine University Ilara =

Private university in Nigeria

Coordinates: 6.5841°N 3.9834°E

Augustine University, Ilara
- Motto: Pro-scientia Et Moribus (Latin)
- Motto in English: "For Learning And Character"
- Type: Private
- Established: 2015
- Affiliations: NUC
- Religious affiliation: Lagos Catholic Archdiocese
- Budget: ₦19,283,687,025
- Chancellor: Femi Ote$
- Vice-Chancellor: Prof. Christopher Odetunde
- Location: (Nigeria) Epe, Lagos State, Nigeria
- Campus: Urban
- Language: English Language
- Website: www.augustineuniversity.edu.ng

Augustine University, Ilara also known as AUI is a private Catholic-owned University located in Ilara, a town in Epe local government area of Lagos State Southwestern Nigeria. The University which was approved on 25 February 2015 by the Federal Government of Nigeria through the National Universities Commission offers courses at undergraduate levels but yet to commence post graduate programs.
