= Gbolahan Mudasiru =

Nigerian politician and air force officer (1945–2003)

Air Commodore Gbolahan Mudasiru
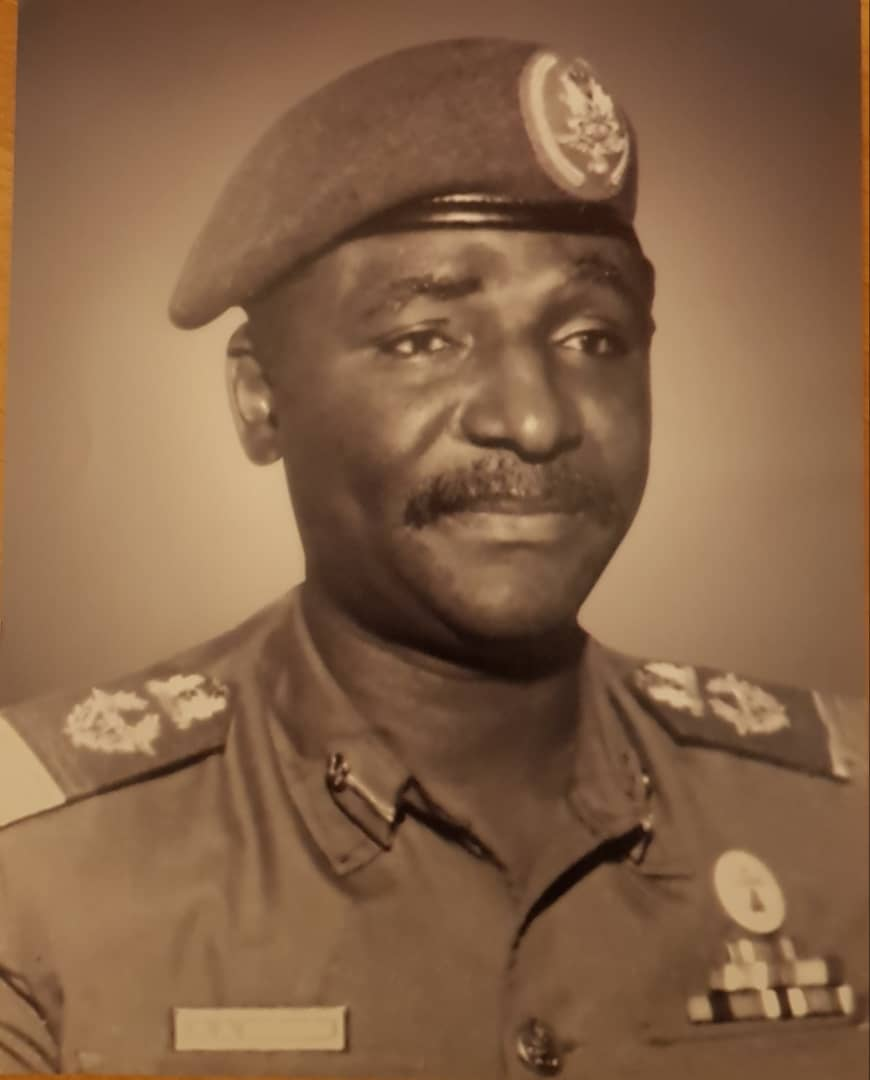
- Gbolahan Mudasiru in Uniform

Governor of Lagos State
- In office January 1984 – August 1986
- Preceded by: Lateef Jakande
- Succeeded by: Mike Akhigbe

Personal details
- Born: 18 October 1945 Lagos, British Nigeria (now in Lagos State, Nigeria)
- Died: 23 September 2003 (aged 57)
- Education: Igbobi College

Military service
- Allegiance: Nigeria
- Branch: Nigerian Air Force
- Rank: Air Commodore

Gbolahan Mudasiru (18 October 1945 – 23 September 2003) was a Nigerian Air Force officer who was the Governor of Lagos State, Nigeria, from January 1984 to August 1986 during the military regimes of General Muhammadu Buhari and his successor General Ibrahim Babangida.

As governor, he continued the work of his predecessor Alhaji Lateef Kayode Jakande in improving schools infrastructure and the standards of teaching. He also introduced improved measures to keep the streets clean and orderly. He attempted to ban street traders, but without success. He set up committees to review the Lagos Metro line project initiated by Jakande, which recommended going ahead with the project, but it was cancelled on the orders of the head of state, General Buhari. After a major fire devastated the Oko-Baba area of Ebute Metta, Mudasiru initiated construction of a medium Income Housing Estate. After he left office, construction of schools ceased and existing buildings were no longer maintained.

Mudasiru died in London on 23 September 2003. Due to a dispute over funeral arrangements between the Nigerian Air force and the Lagos State government, he was buried in London. He left a large estate. The will was disputed, with legal battles continuing between the trustees of the estate and his widow, Mrs Foluke Madasiru and her five children as late as 2009.
