= Mike Akhigbe =

De facto deputy head of state of Nigeria from 1998 to 1999

Vice admiral Mike Akhigbe GCON
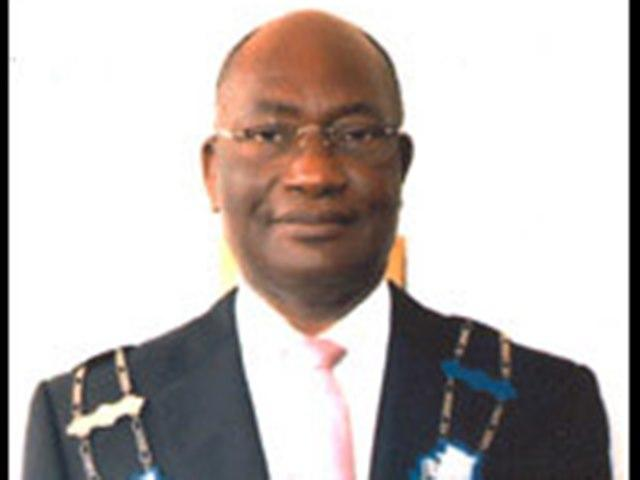

10th Chief of General Staff
- In office 9 June 1998 – 29 May 1999
- Head of state: Abdulsalami Abubakar
- Preceded by: Oladipo Diya
- Succeeded by: Atiku Abubakar as civilian Vice President of Nigeria

Chief of Naval Staff
- In office August 1994 – June 1998
- Preceded by: Rear Adm. Allison Madueke
- Succeeded by: Vice Adm. Jubril Ayinla

Governor of Lagos State
- In office August 1986 – July 1988
- Preceded by: Gbolahan Mudasiru
- Succeeded by: Raji Rasaki

Governor of Ondo State
- In office September 1985 – August 1986
- Preceded by: Michael Bamidele Otiko
- Succeeded by: Ekundayo B. Opaleye

Personal details
- Born: 29 September 1946 Fugar, Southern Region, British Nigeria (now Fugar, Edo State, Nigeria)
- Died: 28 October 2013 (aged 67) New York, United States
- Education: Nigerian Defence Academy

Military service
- Allegiance: Nigeria
- Branch/service: Nigerian Navy
- Years of service: 1967–1999
- Rank: Vice admiral
- Battles/wars: Nigerian Civil War

Okhai Michael Akhigbe GCON (29 September 1946 – 28 October 2013) was a vice admiral of the Nigerian Navy who served as de facto vice president of Nigeria (as Chief of General Staff) under military head of state General Abdusalami Abubakar from June 1998 to May 1999, when the military government was terminated and replaced by the Fourth Nigerian Republic. He previously served as Chief of Naval Staff, the highest-ranking officer of the Nigerian Navy from 1994 to 1998; military governor of Lagos State from 1986 to 1988; and military governor of Ondo State from 1985 to 1986.

== Early life ==
Akhigbe was born on 29 September 1946, in Fugar, Aviawu clan in Etsako Central Local Government Area of Edo State and was educated at Afenmai Anglican Grammar School, Igarra from 1961 to 1965.

== Military career ==
He attended the Nigerian Defence Academy, Royal Naval School of Maritime Operations Dryad, Southwick UK, Command and Staff College Jaji, National Institute for Policy and Strategic Studies Kuru, University of Poitiers, Rouen, France, and the International Defense Management Program at the Naval Postgraduate School, in California, United States.

He was the Principal Welfare Officer of the Nigerian Navy Flagship NNS Aradu, Military Governor of Lagos and Ondo States, Director, Naval Plans, Naval Headquarters, Flag Officer commanding the Easter Naval Command and Chief of Naval Staff.

== Chief of General Staff ==
In 1998, Akhigbe became Chief of General Staff and Vice President of Nigeria, and played a prominent role in the transition from military to civilian rule in 1999 under General Abdusalami Abubakar.

== Later career ==
Akhigbe was an attorney with specialization in maritime law. He was also a seasoned businessman with substantial investments in real estate. He died of throat cancer in New York on 28 October 2013.

== Honours ==
He was awarded the honour of the Grand Commander of the Order of the Niger (GCON), in 1998 and an honorary doctorate by the University of Benin in 2003. His military decorations include Force Service Star, Meritorious Service Star, and Defense Service Star.

== Community development ==
Akhigbe brought electricity to the Fugar community. He brought the administrative headquarters of Etsako Central Local Government Area of Edo State Nigeria to Fugar City. He was the single most important factor in the rehabilitation of the Teacher's college Ikere Ekiti, later called Ondo State College of Education. Akhigbe, then a Navy Commander and Military Governor of old Ondo State approved the appointment of USAID-Harvard trained educationist, Dr. Sam Adebayo Adewuya as the Sole Administrator of the college with the sole command of returning the dilapidated college to functional level within three years. The college has since evolved into the University of Education, Ekiti State Tunedik.
