= Lateef Olufemi Okunnu =

Nigerian lawyer

Pro-chancellor of the University of Agriculture, Makurdi
- In office 1982–1984

Personal details
- Born: 19 February 1933 (age 93) Lagos State, Nigeria
- Party: Independent

Lateef Olufemi Okunnu SAN (born 19 February 1933) is a Nigerian lawyer and former pro-chancellor and chairman governing council of the University of Agriculture, Makurdi.

== Life and career ==
He was born on 19 Feb. 1933 in Lagos State, Nigeria. He had his primary education at Ansar-U-Deen School, Alakoro between 1938 and 1947. He later attended Kings College, in Lagos state (1948-1953). In 1956, he proceeded to the University of London where he obtained a first degree in Law. He was called to Nigerian bar in 1960. He began his career in 1960 as a Legal Practitioner and was appointed Federal Commissioner for Works and Housing in 1967. He served in this capacity for seven years, a tenure that ended in 1974. He was later appointed as Deputy Legal Adviser to the National Party of Nigeria (N.P.N.) In 1981.

== Official duties ==
He was appointed as Leader of the Federal Government Delegation to the Organisation of African Unity Consultative Committee on Nigeria Peace Talks to end the Civil War in 1968 and in 1969, he was appointed Leader of the Nigerian Delegation to the O.A.U. Ministerial Conference. In 1980, he was member of the Nigerian Delegation to the General Assembly of the U.N.O. He was later appointed as pro-chancellor of the University of Agriculture, Makurdi in 1982.

== Awards and honours ==
- Senior Advocate of Nigeria (S.A.N)
- Commander of the Order of the Republic of Niger (CON)
- Commander de I, Ordre National Du Dahomey and Commander National Order of Togo.
- He was awarded with an honorary doctorate degree during the 50th convocation ceremony of the University of Lagos

== Personal ==
His name "Olufemi" means "God loves me" in Yoruba
