= Ebitu Ukiwe =

De facto deputy head of state of Nigeria from 1985 to 1986

Commodore Ebitu Ukiwe

7th Chief of General Staff
- In office August 1985 – October 1986
- President: Ibrahim Babangida as Military President
- Preceded by: Tunde Idiagbon as Chief of Staff, Supreme Headquarters
- Succeeded by: Augustus Aikhomu

Governor of Lagos State
- In office July 1978 – October 1979
- Preceded by: Ndubuisi Kanu
- Succeeded by: Lateef Jakande

Governor of Niger State
- In office December 1977 – July 1978
- Preceded by: Murtala Nyako
- Succeeded by: Joseph Oni

Personal details
- Born: 26 October 1940 (age 85) Abiriba, Southern Region, British Nigeria (now Abiriba, Abia State, Nigeria)
- Spouse: Amina Ukiwe

Military service
- Allegiance: Nigeria (1960–1966; 1972–1986); Biafra (1966–1970)
- Branch/service: Nigerian Navy
- Years of service: 1960–1986
- Rank: Commodore
- Battles/wars: Biafran War

Okoh Ebitu Ukiwe (born 26 October 1940) is a retired Commodore in the Nigerian Navy who served as the de facto Vice President of Nigeria under military head of state General Ibrahim Babangida from 1985 to 1986.

== Family ==
Ukiwe was born on 26 October 1940, the son of Chief Ebitu Ukiwe of Abiriba in Abia State. His father was a traditional ruler in Abiriba and head of the old Bende Division Local Government Appeal Court.

== Naval career ==
Ukiwe joined the Nigerian Navy in 1960 as a cadet (officer), and was commissioned in 1964 with the rank of sub-lieutenant. He defected to the Biafran Armed Forces in 1966.

== Biafran War ==
During the Nigerian Civil War from 1967 to 1970 he fought on the Biafran side. After the war, in January 1972 he was readmitted to the Navy, one of the few Igbo officers to regain their position.

== Military career ==
Ukiwe was a member of the Supreme Military Council between 1975 and 1977. General Olusegun Obasanjo appointed him military governor of Niger State in 1977. He was re-deployed to Lagos State as governor in July 1978, holding this post until October 1979. He was also in the SMC under General Muhammadu Buhari from 1983 to 1985, while serving as Flag Officer, Western Naval command. He was appointed director, Naval Faculty, Jaji (1981–1984) and Flag Officer, Western Naval Command (1984–1985).

== Chief of General Staff ==
In 1985, following the 1985 Nigerian military coup d'état military head of state General Ibrahim Babangida appointed Ukiwe as Chief of General Staff, and his second-in-command. In 1986, Ukiwe, was removed as Chief of General Staff after opposing Babangida's decision to join the Organisation of Islamic Cooperation.

== Later career ==
After retirement he joined the pro-democracy group, supporting Moshood Kashimawo Olawale Abiola, the president-elect in the June 1993 elections, who was imprisoned after General Sani Abacha took power in a coup in November 1993.

He became chairman of companies such as Bitu Properties, Kobimat, Bitu Promar and Rudocons. He served as an adviser and consultant to Statoil (Nigeria), an offshore oil production company, for nine years.

In 2001, Newswatch magazine speculated that he could run for president in 2003, characterizing him as a principled personality. In 2006 Ukiwe unsuccessfully ran to become the Peoples Democratic Party candidate for the presidency of Nigeria.

Ukiwe is a notable voice in the Nigerian Indigenous Nationalities Alliance for Self-Determination (NINAS)'s campaign for an equitable union, against the background of rising Muslim fundamentalism of the Nigerian political North.
