= Bola Tinubu =

President of Nigeria since 2023

His Excellency Asiwaju Bola Tinubu GCFR
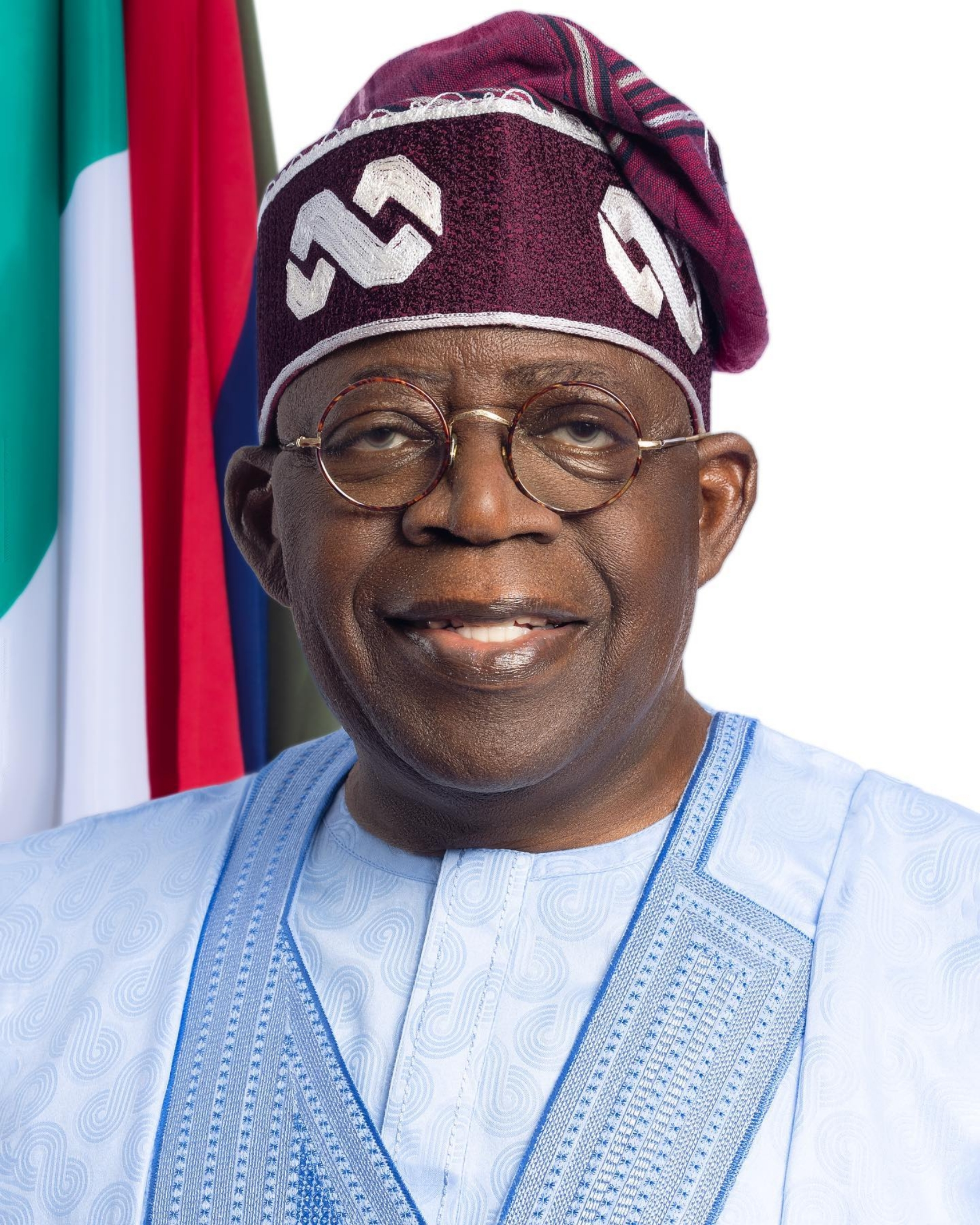
- Official portrait, 2023

16th President of Nigeria
- Incumbent
- Assumed office 29 May 2023
- Vice President: Kashim Shettima
- Preceded by: Muhammadu Buhari

Federal Minister of Petroleum Resources
- Incumbent
- Assumed office 21 August 2023
- President: Himself
- Preceded by: Muhammadu Buhari

12th Governor of Lagos State
- In office 29 May 1999 – 29 May 2007
- Deputy: Kofoworola Bucknor (1999–2002); Femi Pedro (2003–2007); Abiodun Ogunleye (2007)
- Preceded by: Buba Marwa
- Succeeded by: Babatunde Fashola

Member of the Nigerian Senate for Lagos West
- In office 5 December 1992 – 17 November 1993
- Preceded by: Himself
- Succeeded by: Wahab Dosunmu (1999)

Personal details
- Born: Bola Ahmed Adekunle Tinubu; 29 March 1952 (age 74) Lagos, British Nigeria
- Party: All Progressives Congress (2013–present)
- Other political affiliations: Social Democratic Party (1992–1993); Alliance for Democracy (1998–2006); Action Congress of Nigeria (2006–2013)
- Spouse: Remi Tinubu (m. 1987)
- Children: 6
- Parent: Abibatu Mogaji (mother)
- Relatives: Wale Tinubu (nephew)
- Education: Richard J. Daley College; Chicago State University (BS)
- Website: State House website

Asiwaju Bola Ahmed Adekunle Tinubu GCFR (born 29 March 1952) is a Nigerian politician serving as the 16th and current president of Nigeria since 2023. He previously served as the governor of Lagos State from 1999 to 2007 and senator for Lagos West in the Third Republic.

Tinubu spent his early life in southwestern Nigeria and later moved to the United States where he studied accounting at Chicago State University. He returned to Nigeria in the 1980s and was employed by Mobil Nigeria as an accountant, before entering politics as a Lagos West senatorial candidate in 1992 under the banner of the Social Democratic Party. After the military dictator Sani Abacha dissolved the Senate in 1993, Tinubu went into exile and became an activist campaigning for the return of democracy as a part of the National Democratic Coalition movement.

In the first post-transition Lagos State gubernatorial election, Tinubu won by a wide margin as a member of the Alliance for Democracy. Four years later, he won re-election to a second term. After leaving office in 2007, he played a key role in forming the All Progressives Congress in 2013. In 2023, he was elected president, defeating Atiku Abubakar and Peter Obi.

Under his leadership the government ended prior fuel subsidies, citing fiscal pressures, dissolved the governing boards of numerous federal agencies and state-owned enterprises, replaced the majority of military and paramilitary leadership, supported regional efforts to respond to the 2025 Benin coup d'état while engaging with security cooperation with the United States against the Islamic State and survived an alleged coup attempt.

== Early life ==
Tinubu was born in Lagos to a Muslim family from the Yoruba ethnic group, the son of Abibatu Mogaji, the Ìyál'ọ́jà of Lagos. He is generally accepted in reliable sources to have been born in 1952; this year of birth is sometimes disputed by political opponents, who argue that he is much older. Some reliable sources note that his age has not been verified.

=== Education ===
Tinubu attended St. John's Primary School, Aroloya, Lagos before proceeding to Children Home School in Ibadan. Tinubu arrived in the United States in 1975, where he commenced undergraduate studies first at Richard J. Daley College in Chicago and then at Chicago State University where he majored in accounting and management. He worked odd jobs as a dishwasher, night security guard and cab driver to support himself through college. He made the honor dean's list as an undergraduate and taught remedial class tutorials, some of his classmates credited his lectures for their improved grades. Tinubu was the university accounting society president in his senior year. His cumulative GPA was 3.54. Tinubu graduated summa cum laude with a Bachelor of Science in Business Administration in 1979.

=== Early career ===
After graduating, Tinubu worked as an accountant for the American companies Arthur Andersen, Deloitte and GTE Services Corporation. At Deloitte, he gained experience in auditing and management consultancy services for Fortune 500 corporations. He was a consultant for Saudi Aramco's joint venture partner National Oil, helping to establish their accounting and auditing system and leading to his first financial breakthrough. Tinubu moved to London where he was recruited as an auditor for Mobil Oil UK before later joining Mobil Producing Nigeria Unlimited (now Seplat Energy) as a senior company executive and treasurer in the 1980s.

Tinubu actively contributed and raised funds for community development programs in Lagos leading Primrose Group, a political action organization advocating for fundamental progressive changes in the state's politics during the Babangida administration. He later opted fully to enter politics in exchange for his lucrative job at Mobil.

== Early political career ==
Tinubu's political career began in 1991, when he joined the Social Democratic Party and was actively involved in campaigning for the candidacy of Moshood Kashimawo Abiola.

=== Third Republic ===
In 1992, he was elected to the Senate, representing Lagos West Senatorial District. At the National Assembly, he chaired the Senate Committee on Banking, Finance, Appropriation, and Currency.

After the results of the 12 June 1993 presidential elections were annulled, Tinubu became a founding member of the pro-democracy National Democratic Coalition (NADECO), a group which mobilized support for the restoration of democracy and recognition of Abiola as the winner of the 12 June election.

=== Exile and return ===
Following the seizure of power as military head of state of General Sani Abacha, Tinubu faced numerous arrests, detentions, harassment, and threats to his life, forcing him to flee Nigeria for safety. Undeterred, he joined NADECO abroad in-exile to continue fighting for democratic governance and the restoration of rule in the country. He went into exile in 1994 and returned to the country in 1998 after Abacha's death, which ushered in the transition to the Fourth Nigerian Republic.

In the run-up to the 1999 elections, Bola Tinubu was a protégé of Alliance for Democracy (AD) leaders Abraham Adesanya and Ayo Adebanjo. He went on to win the AD primaries for the Lagos State governorship elections in defeating Funsho Williams and Wahab Dosunmu, a former Minister of Works and Housing. In January 1999, he stood for the position of Governor of Lagos State on the AD ticket and was elected governor.

== Governor of Lagos State (1999–2007) ==
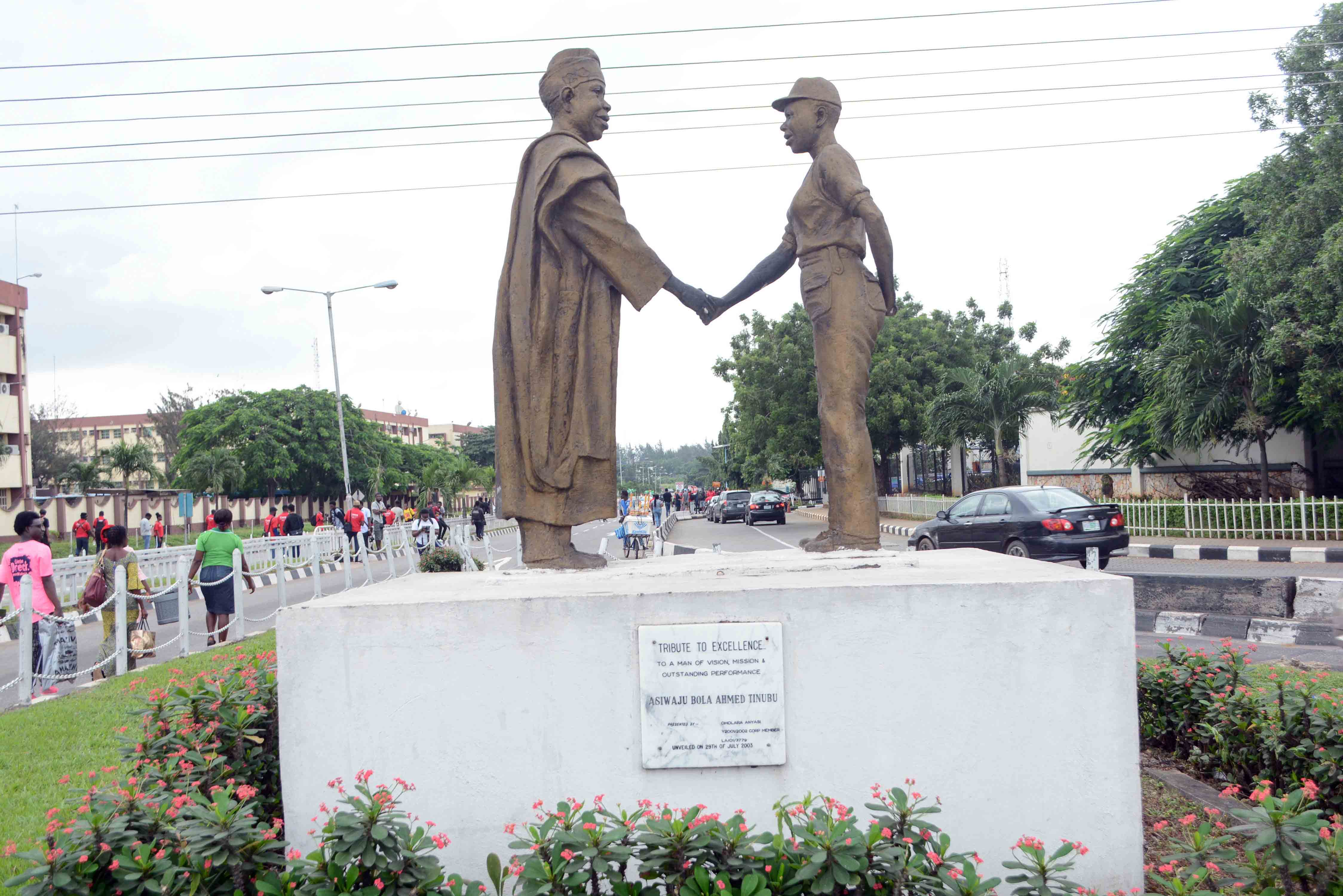
Statue in Ikeja, Lagos State capital

As a skilled political strategist, Tinubu survived the then ruling People's Democratic Party (PDP) massive takeover of the South Western States of Nigeria as the sole re-elected Governor of the AD. This led to frequent clashes with the PDP-controlled Federal Government, especially over his creation of 37 additional Local Council Development Areas for Lagos States. A Supreme Court ruling in his favor ordered the release of seized Lagos State Local Government funds.

During his 8 years in government, Tinubu initiated new road construction, required to meet the needs of the fast-growing population of the state. Asiwaju Bola Ahmed Tinubu, the Executive Governor of Lagos State, Nigeria (1999–2007), received numerous awards for his exceptional leadership. These include Best Governor in Nigeria for 2000 by the Nigerian-Belgian Chamber of Commerce, Y2002 Best Practices Prize for improving the living environment by the Federal Ministry of Works and the UN Habitat Group, and Y2000 Best Computerized Government in Nigeria Award by the Computer Association of Nigeria. He was also conferred with the Honorary Doctor of Law Degree by Abia State University for his contributions to democracy, good governance, and Nigeria's development. Tinubu holds numerous chieftaincy titles and supports various professional and social organizations.

Tinubu, alongside a new deputy governor, Femi Pedro, won re-election into office as governor in April 2003. All other states in the South West fell to the People's Democratic Party in those elections. He was involved in a struggle with the Olusegun Obasanjo-controlled federal government over whether Lagos State had the right to create new Local Council Development Areas (LCDAs) to meet the needs of its large population. The controversy led to the federal government seizing funds meant for local councils in the state. During the latter part of his term in office, he was engaged in continuous clashes with PDP powers such as Adeseye Ogunlewe, a former Lagos State senator who had become minister of works, and Bode George, the southwest chairman of the PDP.

In 2006, Tinubu attempted to persuade the then-vice president of Nigeria Atiku Abubakar to become the head of his new party, the Action Congress of Nigeria (ACN). Abubakar who was a member of the People's Democratic Party (PDP), had recently fallen out with President Olusegun Obasanjo over Abubakar's ambition to succeed Obasanjo as president. Tinubu offered Abubakar the chance to switch parties and join the AC, offering him his party's presidential candidacy, with the condition that he, Tinubu, would be Atiku Abubakar's running mate. Atiku declined the proposition and, having switched to the AC, chose a running mate from the South East, Senator Ben Obi. Although Atiku ran for office on Tinubu's platform in the election, the PDP still won, in a landslide.

Relations between Tinubu and deputy governor Femi Pedro became increasingly tense after Pedro declared his intention to run for the gubernatorial elections. Pedro competed to become the AC candidate for governor in the 2007 elections, but withdrew his name on the eve of the party nomination. He defected to the Labour Party while still keeping his position as deputy governor. Tinubu's tenure as Lagos State Governor ended on 29 May 2007, when his successor and former chief of staff Babatunde Fashola took office as Lagos state governor.

== Pre-presidency (2007–2023) ==
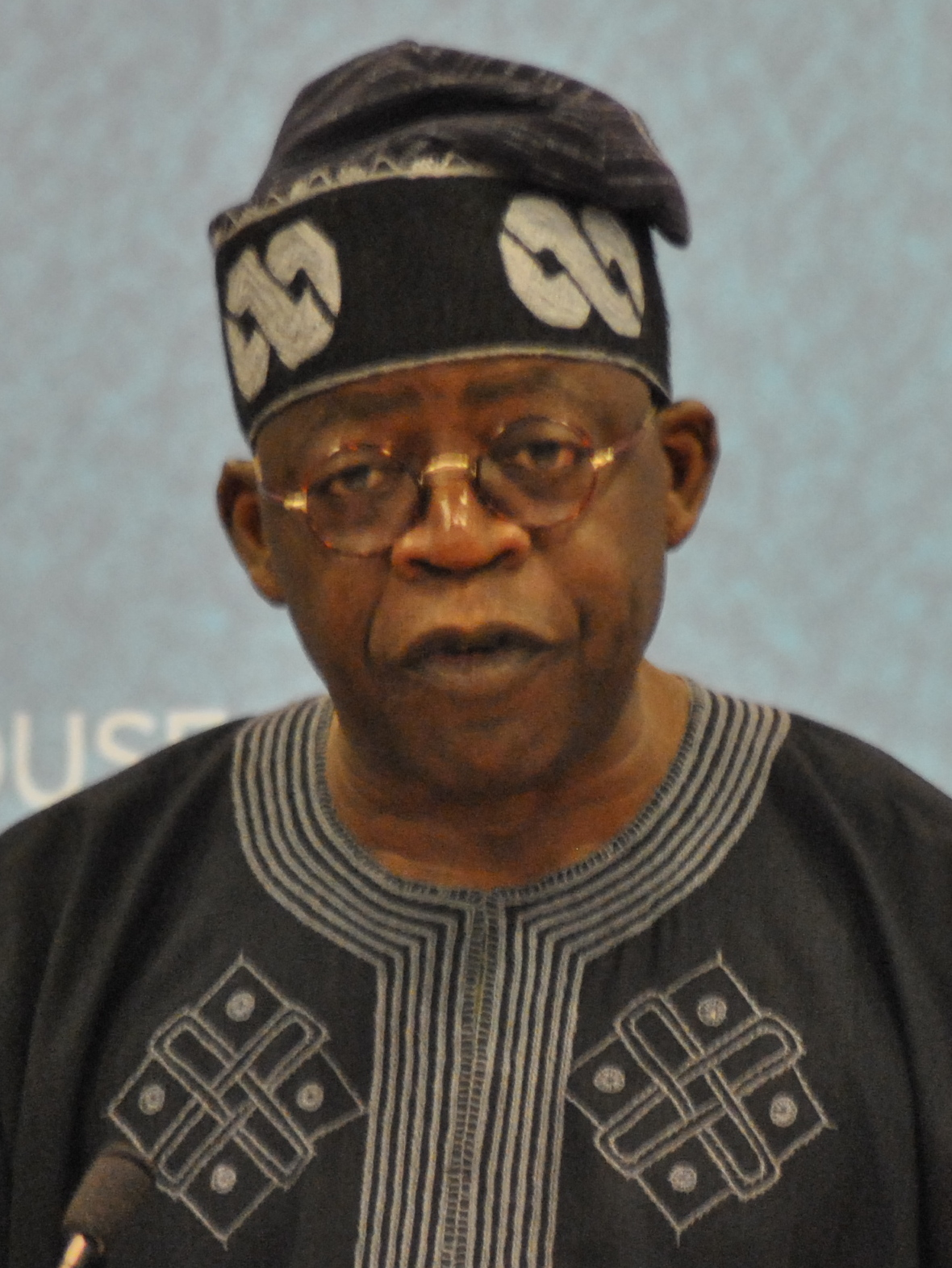
Tinubu speaking at Chatham House (2011)

=== 2007 election ===
In 2009, following the landslide victory of the People's Democratic Party (PDP) in the April 2007 elections, Tinubu became involved in negotiations to bring together the fragmented opposition parties into a "mega-party" capable of challenging the then ruling PDP. In March 2009, there were reports that a plot had been identified to assassinate Tinubu.

=== 2011 presidential election ===
Tinubu as the ACN's national leader openly endorsed the joint candidacy of Nuhu Ribadu and Fola Adeola as the ACN's presidential and vice presidential candidates in 2011. Sahara Reporters later revealed that Tinubu made a deal with the Jonathan administration to support his re-election instead or face perjury charges levied against him on two counts by the federal government over his educational background. Tinubu had previously filled out governorship candidate forms in 1998 to the Independent National Electoral Commission, falsely admitting that he had attended Government College, Ibadan. Tinubu later stated in the run up to the 2015 election that he supported the candidacy of Goodluck Jonathan due to his perceived reform agenda, a claim which he had previously sued publisher Sahara Reporters over.

=== 2015 presidential election ===
In February 2013, Tinubu was among several politicians who created a "mega opposition" party with the merger of Nigeria's three biggest opposition parties – the Action Congress of Nigeria (ACN), the Congress for Progressive Change (CPC), the All Nigeria Peoples Party (ANPP), a faction of the All Progressives Grand Alliance (APGA) and the new PDP (nPDP), a faction of the then ruling People's Democratic Party – into the All Progressives Congress (APC).

In 2014, Tinubu supported former military head of state General Muhammadu Buhari, leader of the CPC faction of the APC – who commanded widespread following in Northern Nigeria, and had previously contested in the 2003, 2007 and 2011 presidential elections as the CPC presidential candidate. Tinubu initially wanted to become Buhari's vice presidential candidate but later conceded for Yemi Osinbajo, his ally and former commissioner of justice. In 2015, Buhari rode the APC to victory, ending the 16-year rule of the PDP, and marking the first time an incumbent Nigerian president lost to an opposition candidate.

Tinubu went on to play an important role in the Buhari administration, supporting government policies and holding onto the internal party reins, in lieu of his long-held rumored presidential aspiration. In 2019, he supported Buhari's re-election campaign defeating the PDP candidate Atiku Abubakar. In 2020, following an internal party crisis which led to the removal of Tinubu ally and party chairman Adams Oshiomole, it is believed the move was to scuttle Tinubu's presidential prospects ahead of 2023.

=== 2023 presidential election ===
On 10 January 2022, Tinubu made his formal announcement of candidacy for president. On 8 June 2022, Tinubu won the party convention vote of the ruling APC, scoring 1,271, to defeat Vice President Yemi Osinbajo and Rotimi Amaechi who scored 235 and 316 respectively.

On 1 March 2023, INEC declared Tinubu winner of the 2023 presidential election. He was declared president-elect after he polled 8,794,726 votes to defeat his opponents. He took 36.6 percent of the vote and polled at least 25 percent in 28 states, just barely enough to win the presidency in a single round. His runner-up Atiku Abubakar of the opposition People's Democratic Party (PDP) polled 6,984,520 votes. Labour Party's Peter Obi had 6,101,533 votes to come third.

The general election was noted by initially high projected turnout and lack of a peaceful voting process. It was marred by reports of vote buying, voter intimidation, attacks on polling units in certain areas, and unpunctual electoral officials along with accusations of outright fraud; to compound issues with trust in the election, Independent National Electoral Commission officials failed to upload polling unit results to the INEC result viewing portal as previously assured would happen on election day. As state results started to be announced on 26 February at the national collation centre in Abuja, opposition emerged as results data had still not been fully uploaded prior to their announcement in accordance with the law. These circumstances along with statements critical of INEC from observers and civil society groups led the Abubakar, Obi, and Kwankwaso campaigns to question and then officially reject the announced election results by 28 February. All three main opposition campaigns, in addition to some civil society groups and former President Olusegun Obasanjo, called on the commission to rerun the election due to fraud and violence. Meanwhile, the Tinubu campaign praised the commission and called for the arrest of PDP spokesmen for "incitement of violence." In the early morning of 1 March, INEC chairman Mahmood Yakubu declared Tinubu as the victor after all state results were collated. In response, Abubakar, Obi, and Kwankwaso rejected and vowed to challenge the results.

== Presidency (2023–present) ==
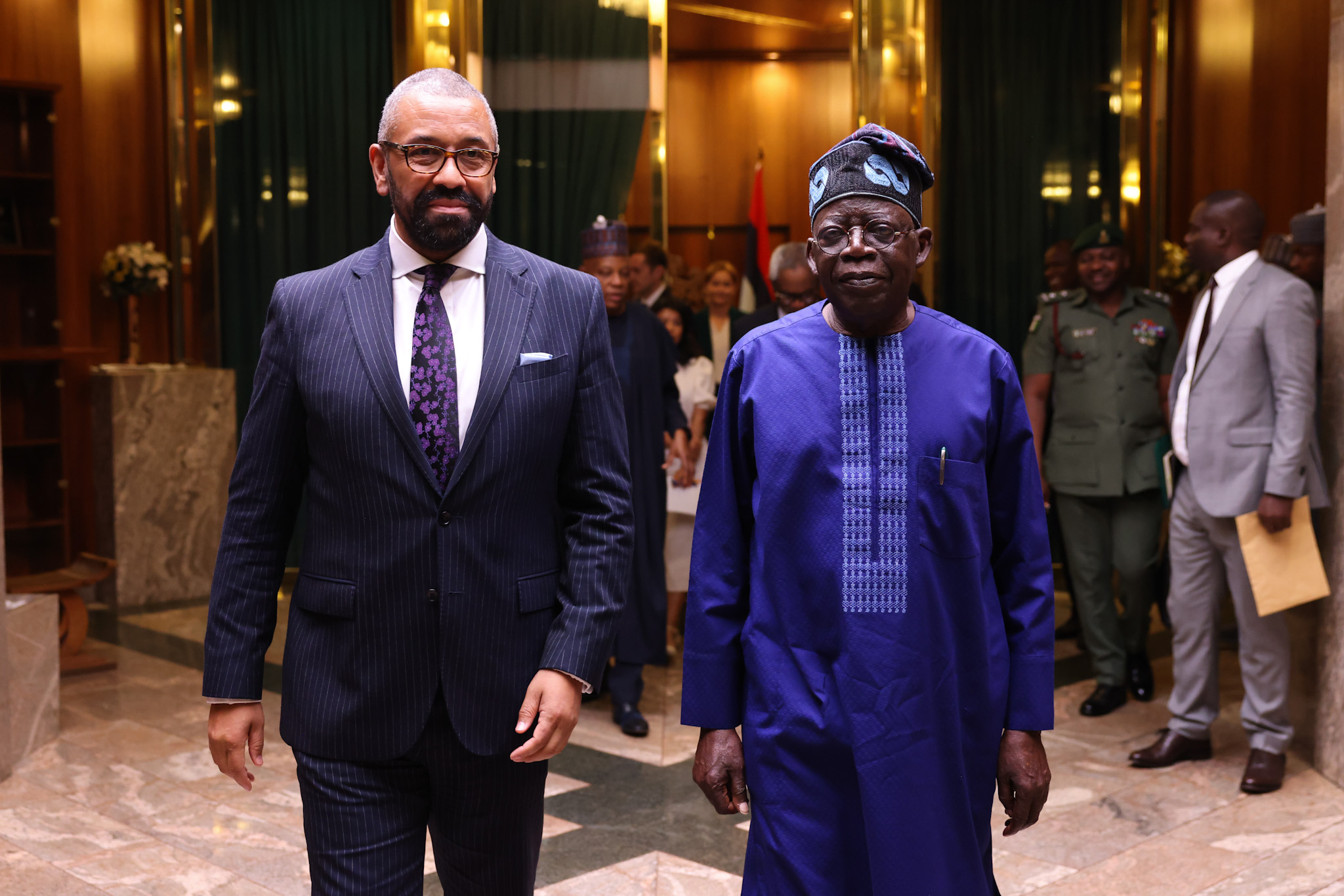
Tinubu meeting with British Foreign Secretary James Cleverly (August 2023)

Tinubu constitutionally began his presidency on 29 May 2023. He was sworn in as President of Nigeria by the Chief Justice Olukayode Ariwoola at 10:41 AM (WAT) at an inauguration ceremony held in Eagle Square in Abuja. His government, having cleared the legal hurdles of the opposition following the March election, is generally accepted unopposed and has international legitimacy. Several heads of state and government attended the swearing-in ceremony. Tinubu was conferred with the highest national honour of the Grand Commander of the Order of the Federal Republic by his predecessor Muhammadu Buhari, and Vice President Kashim Shettima with the second highest honour of the Grand Commander of the Order of the Niger on 25 May 2023.

=== Economic reforms ===
Tinubu in his inaugural address promulgated the removal of the government subsidy on fuel. The statement in his inaugural address caused initial panic buying and an overnight increase in prices at fuel pump stations in Nigeria. The national labour union NLC called for nationwide strike and protests over the increase in fuel price, which was later called off amidst ongoing negotiations with government representatives. The government subsidy on fuel consumption has caused a haemorrhage on the Nigerian public purse for decades and the removal was lauded as a positive development by the World Bank for the Nigerian economy. On 29 May 2023, Tinubu ended the costly subsidy of fuel that had previously existed in Nigeria, bringing privatization to the petroleum industry of Nigeria. The subsidy had cost the Nigerian government $10 billion per year at the time it was finally ended by Tinubu.

President Tinubu on the night of 9 June suspended Godwin Emefiele, the powerful governor of the central bank of Nigeria. Emefiele's suspension was the second ever a head of the apex bank in its history was removed by a Nigerian president. Emefiele was arrested by Nigerian secret police SSS in Lagos attempting to flee the country to Benin. The suspension was viewed as a positive development. Emefiele as a conservative banker ascribed to the old school of propping up the Nigerian naira. Emefiele was replaced by one of his more economical liberal deputies Folashodun Adebisi as acting governor of the Central Bank of Nigeria in a statement by the presidency "sequel to the ongoing investigation of his office and the planned reforms in the financial sector of the economy". The suspension and subsequent arrest of Emefiele by secret police on charges of terrorism financing is seen as not far removed from his ideological leanings and politicising of the apex bank with his initiatives in office such as arbitrage under the Buhari administration and a currency redesign of the Nigerian naira. However, some observers have noted the role of politics in Emefiele's suspension amid a clandestine raise in government debt borrowing ceiling from 5% to 15% through ways and means on the eve of the inauguration of President Tinubu.

On the back of his suspension, the apex bank five days later on 14 June removed all foreign exchange trading restrictions and allowed the national currency to fall to its lowest ever on the market. The move, though not unprecedented, signalled what was expected after the suspension. Tinubu's financial reforms has been seen as surpassing the 1986 SAP regime in a bid to drastically overhaul the Nigerian economy and government finances since the return of democracy two decades prior. On 15 June, President Tinubu inaugurated the national economic council chaired by Vice President Shettima. The Council is mandated to advise the President on economic affairs and is composed of the governor of the central bank and all state governors of the federation. Tinubu's close associate, investment banker Wale Edun, is the monetary policy czar.

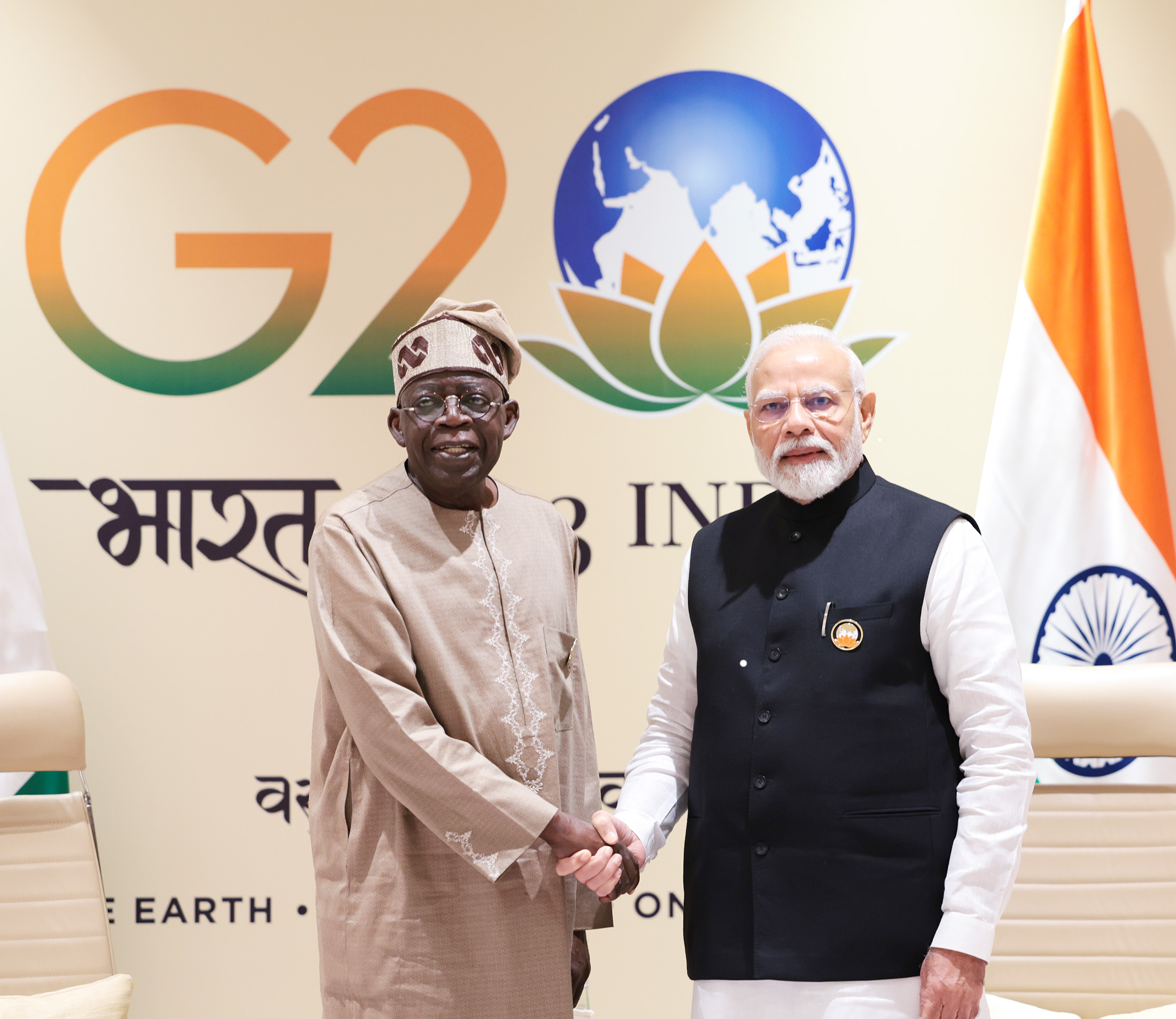
Indian Prime Minister Narendra Modi meeting with Tinubu at the 2023 G20 New Delhi summit

=== Cabinet and appointments ===
President Tinubu appointed on 3 June Senator George Akume as the Secretary to the Government of the Federation and Femi Gbajabiamila as Chief of Staff to the President. Tinubu suspended the EFCC chairman Abdulrasheed Bawa on 9 June and Nigerian secret police arrested him for abuse of office on the same day following a standoff between SSS agents and the EFCC in Lagos. His suspension like Emefiele's involved a lot of intrigues as Bawa had previously placed Tinubu under investigation. Bawa was replaced with Abdulkarim Chukkol as acting chairman of the EFCC.

President Tinubu on 19 June proclaimed Mallam Nuhu Ribadu as the National Security Adviser. The appointment of Nuhu Ribadu, a former police officer, was viewed as a radical turn from the military establishment which has long dominated the state security apparatus of Nigeria. President Tinubu purged the leadership of the entire armed and paramilitary forces on 19 June retiring in the process over one hundred and fifty major generals. The direction of state security under Tinubu is expected to be led by civilian control of the military under the Office of the National Security Adviser, a statutory constitutional body established in 1993.

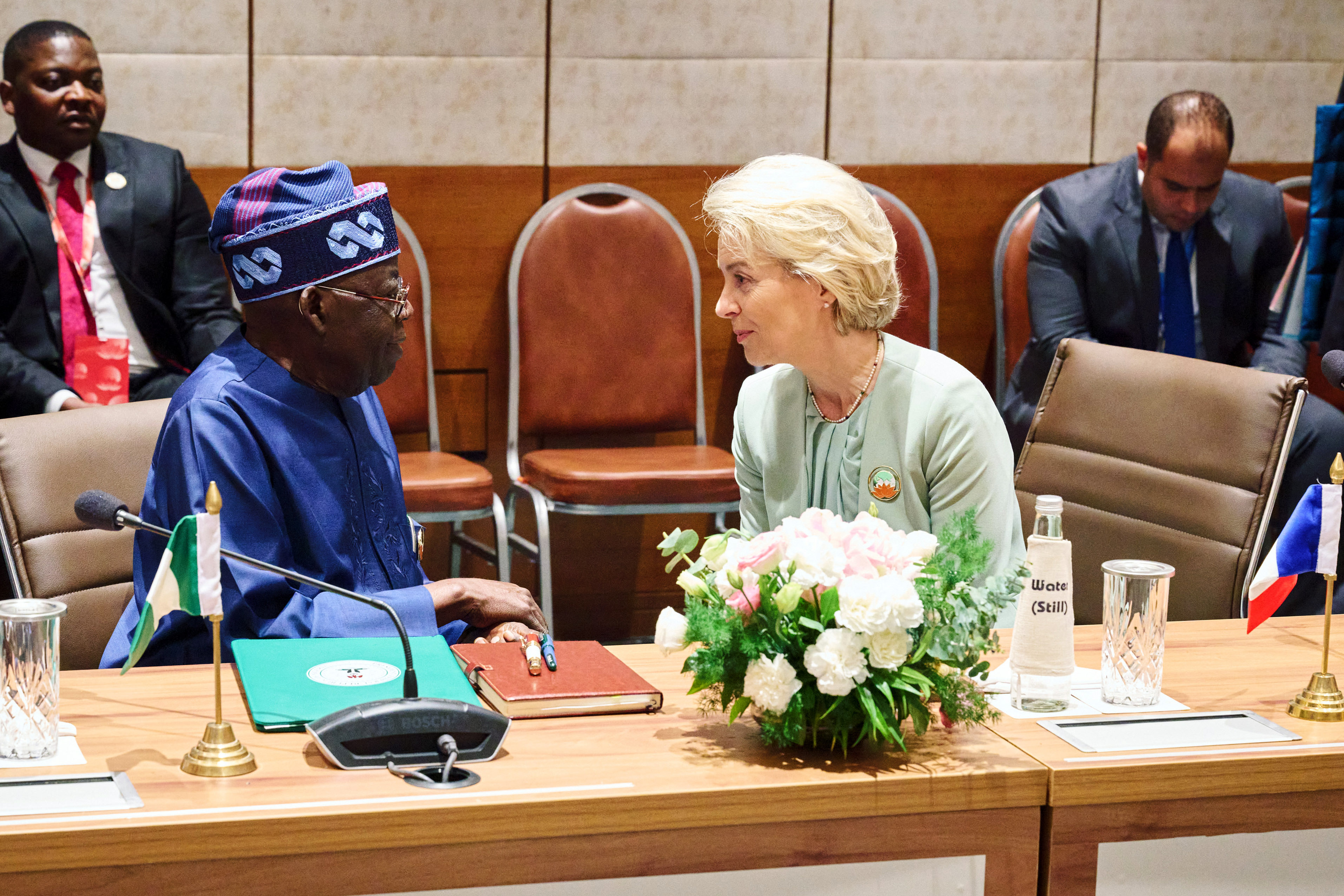
President of the European Commission Ursula von der Leyen meeting with Tinubu at the 2023 G20 New Delhi summit

Tinubu despite drastic changes in fiscal and monetary policies had yet to constitute his cabinet. He has made calls for a coalition government in order to bring opposition leaders under him. A constitutional amendment passed by his predecessor made provisions for the President to appoint Ministers within the first sixty days in office. Tinubu dissolved the boards of all ministries, departments and agencies of Nigeria on 19 June. Having spent one month in office and with the conclusion of parliamentary leadership elections Tinubu is constrained by law to send ministerial nominations to the Senate for hearing before July 29.

On 16 February 2024, Tinubu appointed Oyetunde Oladimeji Ojo, who is married to his daughter Folashade Tinubu, as head of the Federal Housing Authority, producing criticism for its alleged nepotism.

=== Culture ===
On 29 May 2024, Tinubu signed into law an act readopting Nigeria, We Hail Thee, which was the country's national anthem from 1960 to 1978, as its national anthem, replacing Arise, O Compatriots. Tinubu declared a state of emergency in Rivers State removing the governor and replacing him with an appointed administrator. The moved was widely criticized as being grotesquely unconstitutional.

=== Coup plot ===
In late September 2025, a coup plot against the Tinubu administration which was uncovered by Nigerian military intelligence and leaked by Sahara Reporters. Independence Day military parade scheduled for 1 October 2025 was cancelled, sixteen military officers were arrested by the Defence Intelligence Agency including a brigadier general, colonel, four lieutenant colonels, five majors, two captains, a naval lieutenant commander and an air force squadron leader. Initial reports of the plot were denied by the military who downplayed the arrests as disciplinary in nature. The plot allegedly involved officers of northerner extraction masterminded by Colonel Mohammed Ma'aji, and included an officer attached to the office of the national security adviser with alleged financial support from former governor and petroleum minister Timipre Slyva. The plotters planned to violently overthrow the federal government on 25 October by assassinating the President and several high-ranking government officials. Tinubu replaced the military service chiefs on 18 October, with General Olufemi Oluyede promoted to chief of defence staff and investigations are still ongoing.

=== Civil conflict ===
==== US strikes ====
In early November 2025, U.S. President Donald Trump ordered the United States military to prepare for military action in Nigeria. Trump cited the alleged violent killings of Christians and alleged violations of religious freedom as the reason for designating Nigeria as a “country of particular concern” for failure to address violent communal and religious conflicts in the country by Islamist insurgents, bandits, extremists and herder-farmer clashes. President Tinubu rejected Trump's accusation and spoke of the Nigerian government's efforts to protect its citizens regardless of religion.

On 25 December 2025, at the request of Tinubu's administration the United States carried out a strike against the Islamic State in northwest Nigeria. U.S. President Donald Trump, claimed the U.S. struck in order to protect Christians from perceived religious violence in northern Nigeria, the U.S. strike is the first foreign military intervention in post-independence Nigeria.

=== Foreign policy ===
Tinubu embarked on his first foreign visit as Nigerian president to Paris on 21 June to attend a global financial summit held at Palais Brongniart from 22 to 24 June. He left Paris for London on a "private visit" where he met with his predecessor Muhammadu Buhari.

In August 2023, he advocated for military intervention into Niger during the 2023 Nigerien crisis. This was criticised by the opposition.

In December 2025, Tinubu authorized the Nigerian Armed Forces to carry out a military intervention in neighbouring Benin to support the country's government following a coup attempt against President Patrice Talon.

In May 2026, Tinubu embarked on a three-day visit to France to meet with global investors in defense of his economic reforms.

=== 2027 Presidential re-election bid ===
Independent National Electoral Commission (INEC) published its final list of presidential candidates for the 16 January 2027 general election. The list, signed by INEC Secretary Rose Oriaran-Anthony, confirmed Tinubu as the candidate of the All Progressives Congress (APC), with incumbent Vice President Kashim Shettima again as his running mate. The list featured a total of 18 political parties.

== Ideology and public image ==
Tinubu has throughout his political career espoused a comprehensive political and economic platform. Tinubu's ideal of progressivism include the values of egalitarianism, social justice, liberty, and the recognition of fundamental rights. He views the state as a positive advocate for the public welfare and its intervention in Nigerian society as necessary to ensure equality, justice, and social harmony. This ideal is not so far removed from his activism of democracy during the military dictatorship in Nigeria.

=== Economic views ===
His presidency and economic policies, which are known as Tinubunomics, are expected to be a politico-ideological departure from Buharism, albeit most international economists are yet to ascertain the nature of this departure in economic terms; reforms in his first month in office have shown a departure from the previous administration. The World Bank and IMF have pointed out the need for the incoming government to establish macro-structural adjustments on the scale of the late 1980s reform to re-herald the Nigerian economy amidst a global slowdown. Tinubunomics has been outlined in a book he co-authored with Brian Browne, an American consul general in Lagos.

=== The Lion of Bourdillon ===
Tinubu has been widely perceived as the "Godfather of Lagos". His role in pulling the strings of the mega city-state was exposed in The Lion of Bourdillon, a 2015 documentary film highlighting Tinubu's political and financial grip on the city-state. Tinubu filed a ₦150 billion libel suit against the producers, Africa Independent Television (AIT). The documentary ceased airing on 6 March 2015. He has attempted to strongarm the political process, including in December 2009, when it was reported that Fashola and Tinubu had fallen out over the issue of Fashola's re-election as Governor of Lagos in 2011, with Tinubu preferring the commissioner for environment, Muiz Banire. A similar conflict took place in 2015 over Fashola's successor, Akinwunmi Ambode, pitting Fashola against Tinubu, who threw his full weight behind Ambode. Ambode succeeded Fashola, was ousted by Tinubu and replaced by incumbent Babajide Sanwo-Olu.

=== Allegations of corruption ===
In 1993, his assets were frozen by the United States government as a result of a court case asserting that the American government had "probable cause" to believe Tinubu's American bank accounts held the proceeds of heroin dealing. He settled with the U.S. government and forfeited about $460,000 later that year. Court documents and later reporting on the case suggested he worked in league with two Chicago heroin dealers.

In April 2007, after the general elections, but before the governor-elect Babatunde Fashola had taken office, the Federal Government brought Tinubu before the Code of Conduct Bureau for trial over the alleged illegal operation of 16 separate foreign accounts.

In January 2009, the Economic and Financial Crimes Commission cleared Tinubu and governors James Ibori of Delta State and Obong Victor Attah of Akwa Ibom State of charges of conspiracy, money laundering, abuse of office and official corruption in relation to a sale of Vmobile network shares in 2004. In September 2009, there were reports that the British Metropolitan Police were investigating a transaction in which the Lagos State government made an investment in Econet (now Airtel). Tinubu said the transaction was straightforward and profitable to the state, with no intermediaries involved. The Federal Government rejected a request by Britain to release evidence needed for further investigation and prosecution of the three Nigerian ex-governors in a London court.

During the 2019 election, a bullion van was seen entering Tinubu's residence on Bourdillion Road in Ikoyi, which caused him to later exclaim: "I keep money anywhere I want."

== Personal life ==
Tinubu married Oluremi Tinubu, who is a former senator representing the Lagos Central senatorial district, in 1987. They have three children, Zainab Abisola Tinubu, Habibat Tinubu and Olayinka Tinubu. He fathered three children from previous relationships, Kazeem Olajide Tinubu (12 October 1974 – 31 October 2017), Folashade Tinubu (born 17 June 1976) and Oluwaseyi Tinubu (born 13 October 1985).

Tinubu's mother, Abibatu Mogaji, died on 15 June 2013 at the age of 96. On 31 October 2017, his son, Jide Tinubu, died in London.

Tinubu is a Muslim.

== Honours and decorations ==
=== National honours ===
- Nigeria:
  - Grand Commander of the Order of the Federal Republic (GCFR) (25 May 2023)

=== Traditional titles ===
Tinubu holds two traditional chieftaincies; he is the "Asiwaju" of Lagos and the "Jagaba" of the Borgu Emirate in Niger State.

== See also ==
- List of current heads of state and government
- List of heads of the executive by approval rating

Party political offices
New political party	AD nominee for Governor of Lagos State; 1999, 2003	Succeeded by Hakeem Akinola Gbajabiamila
Preceded by Muhammadu Buhari	APC nominee for President of Nigeria; 2023	Most recent
Political offices
Preceded by Buba Marwa	Governor of Lagos State; 1999–2007	Succeeded by Babatunde Fashola
Preceded by Muhammadu Buhari	President of Nigeria; 2023–present	Incumbent
