= Epe, Lagos State =

Town and LGA in Lagos state

Epe
- City and LGA
- Epe Local Government Area
- Nickname: Ẹpẹ Alarọ
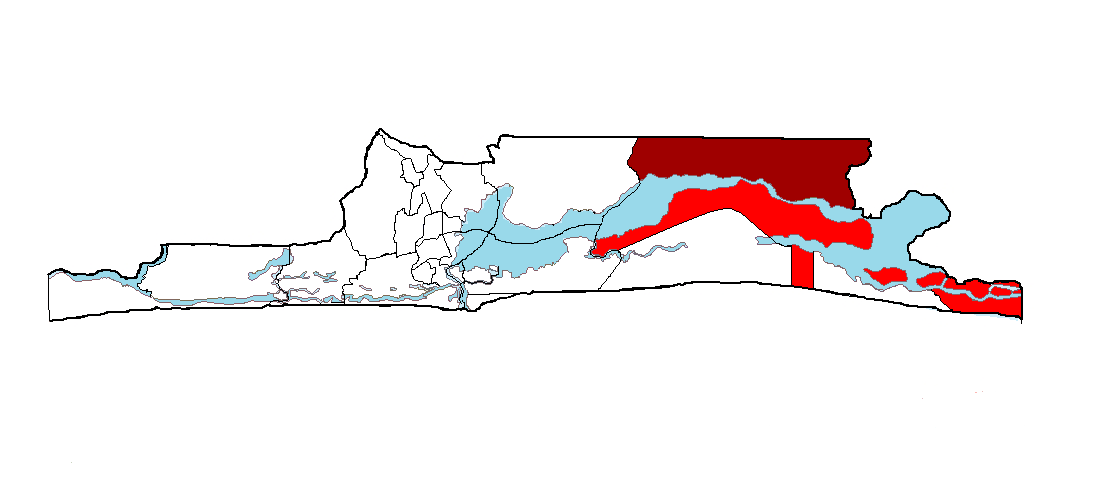
- Epe shown within the State of Lagos; the town is highlighted in deep red, while the rest of the LGA is highlighted in lighter red
- Interactive map of Epe
- Location in Nigeria
- Coordinates: 6°35′N 3°59′E
- Country: Nigeria
- State: Lagos State
- Seat: Itamarun, Epe

Government
  - Type: LG Chairmanship/Olojaship
  - Oloja of Epe: Oba Kamorudeen Ishola Animashaun
  - LGA Chairman: Princess Surah Olayemi (APC)

Area
  - Total: 1,315 km^{2} (508 sq mi)
- Elevation: 25 m (82 ft)

Population (2022)
  - Total: 269 000
  - Density: 204.6/km^{2} (530/sq mi)
- Time zone: UTC+1 (WAT)
- National language: Yorùbá

Epe is a city and Local Government Area (LGA) in Lagos State, Nigeria located on the north side of the Lekki Lagoon and about 90 km from Ibadan. During the 2006 Census, the population of Epe was approximately 181,409.

There is paramount ruler in the area as there are two major communities with individual monarchs. These are the Eko Epe and Ijebu Epe communities within the same town. The paramount ruler is the oloja of epeland who is the chairman obas and chiefs in epe division and also vice chairman obas and chiefs in Lagos state. notable festivals that are mostly celebrated in Epe land include Kayo-kayo Festival, Ebi day, Ojude-Oba, and Epe day.

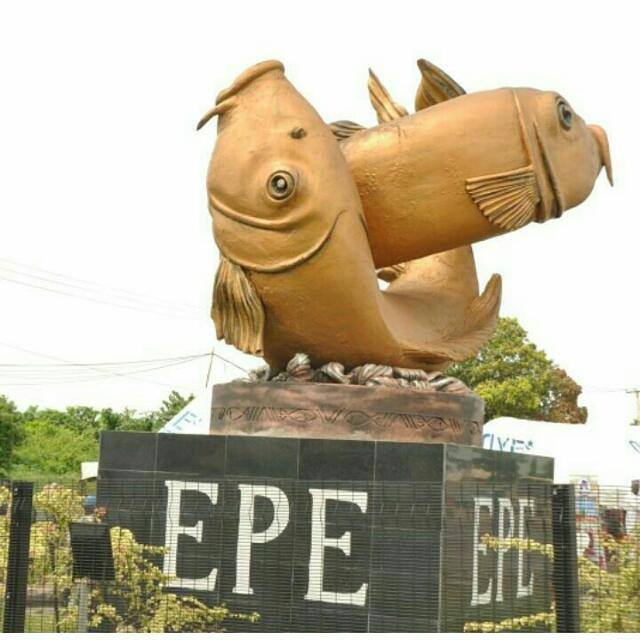
Epe, Lagos

A road junction at the entrance into Epe from the Lekki-Epe Expressway features a sculpture of two giant fish, erected by the Lagos State Government.

Notable higher institutions like Lagos State University (LASU), Yaba College of Technology, Lagos State University of Education (LASUED) (Formerly known as Michael Otedola College of Primary Education - MOCPED), and St. Augustine university all have campuses in Epe area of Lagos, Nigeria.

== History ==
In years past, before this settlement came to be called Epe, the town had earlier been known as Igbo Obo (Forest of Monkeys). Some group of hunters from Ijebu, were led by one Urankaloye or Uraka had visited this part of the world during a hunting expedition in search for animals. Though it later served as the refuge for the forces of Kosoko, the Yoruba king ousted from Eko area of Lagos by the British in 1851. In 1892, Epe was the embarkation point for the military expedition sent by Sir Gilbert Carter, the then Governor of Lagos, to defeat the awujale (the Ijebu political and spiritual ruler) at Ijebu-Ode. Uraka and Aramope which were both hunters then left Ile-Ife on a hunting expedition arriving in Ijebu-Ode, Uraka never knew that he was on a threshold of history.

When Uraka got to Ijebu-Ode, he got a message through an Ifa divination. He was told to move southwards towards the sea and should settle anywhere between his crossing of the sixth and seventh river. After crossing the fifth river called "OTERIN" (Cold Water), he got to a place later identified as 'Poka' where he used his popoka stick to strike the ground. Poka town was derived from his name called Uraka's popoka stick. At Poka, the Ifa oracle was further consulted for direction which led Uraka to proceed and after crossing the sixth river, he finally settled in a place called "ETITA".

Upon settling at Etita, Uraka saw a smoke emanating from a heavily thick forest towards the lagoon. To see things for himself, Uraka traced the source of the smoke where he met some fishermen named Opute, Lugbasa, Alaro and Ogunmodede. Alaro and Ogunmodede were married but childless. Both later became deities and are worshipped in Epe till date, hence all Epe's sons and daughters are referred to as "Omo Epe Alaro Ogunmodede".

Meanwhile Uraka continued his hunting expeditions until he got to a place called Igbo obo (monkey forest), the present site of the Lagos State University, School of Engineering and formerly a military barracks, from where he continued his search for games. He later discovered a place called Oko-Eepe (Forest of black ants). As it turned out, whenever Uraka set his traps for games, he always returned home empty handed. This became a source of worry to him and his wife. Yet he was convinced that Oko-Eepe was home to the biggest games around. He complained to his wife named "PEETA" that the forest was infested with black ants and whenever he tapped his feet to ward off the black ants, animals around would take to their heels. More so, any animal caught by his traps were always eaten up by the ants before he got there.

Each time Uraka sets out for hunting, Peeta would ask if he was still going to Oko-Eepe. Eepe town derived its name from Oko-Eepe in the 15th century and some historians believed Peeta, Uraka's wife, must have played a vital role in the naming of Epe Town. Epe started expanding and in no time, some people settled at Areke or Aleke while others settled at the other side known as "Apakeji". Along the line, an Ijebu prince, son of the fifth Awujale of Ijebu-Ode, Obaloja left Ijebu-Ode and settled in Epe. He took the name Oloja and by 1790, Shagbafara was installed Oloja. As at 1810, Epe was fairly a large town. The town was relatively peaceful but had its own share of inter-tribal war. However, 1848 witnessed the Makun-Omi-Epe war. It was almost immediately after the end of Makun-Omi-Epe war that King Kosoko of Lagos sought refuge in Epe Land with over 1,500 followers. That was in December 1851, during the reign of Oloja Olumade.

Kosoko was denied entry into Epe town but after a long plea, he was directed to Ijebu-Ode to obtain clearance and permission from Awujale Anikilaya. The Awujale consequently considered him as a mark of royalty and sent "Oja Ikale" as symbol of permission and caring to Oloja Olumade, asking him to grant Kosoko and his lieutenants' asylum in Epe. Kosoko's stay in Epe was a subject of controversy. Some claimed that in his 11 years in Epe, he never had a house of his own, while others think otherwise. But whatever the case might have been, Kosoko's years in Epe changed the socio-cultural atmosphere of Epe town, because some of his followers to Epe town were Muslims.

Balogun Ajeniya, Oshodi Tapa, Buraimoh Edu, Balogun Agbaje, Disu Kujeniya, Braimoh Iyanda Oloko and Posu were some of the brave warriors who were in Epe with Kosoko. Some of these chiefs converted to Islam. For example, Balogun Ajeniya, who later became a great promoter of Islam in Epe was one of them. These converts later formed a community under the leadership of Mallam Idris Saliu Gana, who happened to be an Imam in Lagos. This was responsible for the spread of Islam in Epe town to date. The term "Epe Onikurani" was as a result of the spread of Islam in Epe. In appreciation for the treatment accorded to him in Epe, Kosoko gave one of his daughters named Kusade to an Ijebu Chief, Adebawon of Idogun in marriage; Adenusi was the product of that marriage.

In 1869, Kosoko was pardoned and later returned to Lagos. The bulk of his followers left with him, including his daughter Kusade, and leaving behind his grandson Adenusi. Adenusi's family is still multiplying in Epe to date. Those left behind by Kosoko formed bulk of what is now referred to as Epe Eko. In 1892, Epe was the embarkation point for the military expedition sent by Sir Gilbert Carter, the governor of Lagos, to defeat the awujale (the Ijebu political and spiritual ruler) at Ijebu-Ode.

Modern Epe is a collecting point for the export of fish, cassava (manioc), corn (maize), green vegetables, coconuts, cocoa, palm produce, rubber, and firewood to Lagos. Special leaves useful in preserving kola nuts are trucked to Ijebu-Ode, Shagamu, and the other main kola-shipping towns. Epe is best known for its construction of the motorized, shallow-draft barges that navigate the coastal lagoons.

Fishing is the major occupation in Epe. The town is served by secondary schools, several hospitals, and a health office. They are popularly known for fishing. Epe is home to the Oluwo Fish Market, the largest of its kind in Lagos State

Epe to this day is a predominantly Muslim town.

== Climate ==
In Epe, the wet season is overcast, the dry season is partly cloudy, and it is oppressive and hot year round. Epe experiences a moderate climate, and the summers are not easy to define. The most opportune time to visit are January, May, July, August, September, October, November and December.

== Notable people ==
- Femi Otedola, businessman
- Akinwunmi Ambode, governor
- Shafi Edu, businessman
- Michael Otedola, governor
- Dapo Sarumi, politician
- John Obafunwa, lawyer
- Adeyemi Ikuforiji, politician and economist
- DJ Cuppy, DJ and producer
- Wale Raji, Epe representative of the House of Representatives
- Femi Hamzat, politician
- Lanre Rasaq, Balogun of Epe and politician
- Tobun Abiodun, Member Lagos State House of Assembly

== Tourist centres and monuments ==
- Agricultural Training Institute, Araga, Epe.
- Centre for Rural Development's [CERUD] Complex and Botanical Garden, Igbodu, Epe.
- Eko Tourist Beach Resort, Akodo, Ibeju-Lekki.
- Lagos State University [LASU], Epe Campus.
- Lekki Free Trade Zone Complex.
- Yaba College of Technology (YABATECH), Epe Campus.
- Lekki Rest House: Confinement Home of Nigeria's first Opposition Leader.
- Murtala Mohammed Botanical Garden, Epe.
- Recreation Centre, Epe, Marina.
- Relics of Brazilian Architecture and Atlantic Slave Trade, Lekki Town.
- Youth Rehabilitation and Development Centre, Ita-Oko Island, Epe.

== Gallery ==
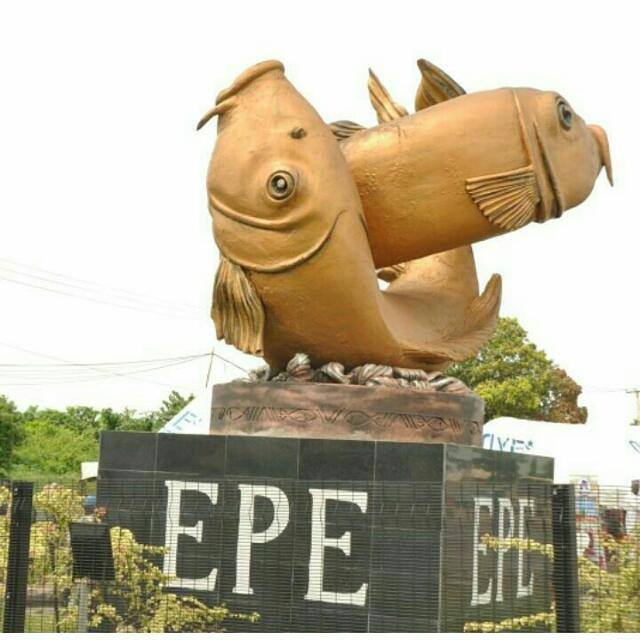
Epe roundabout

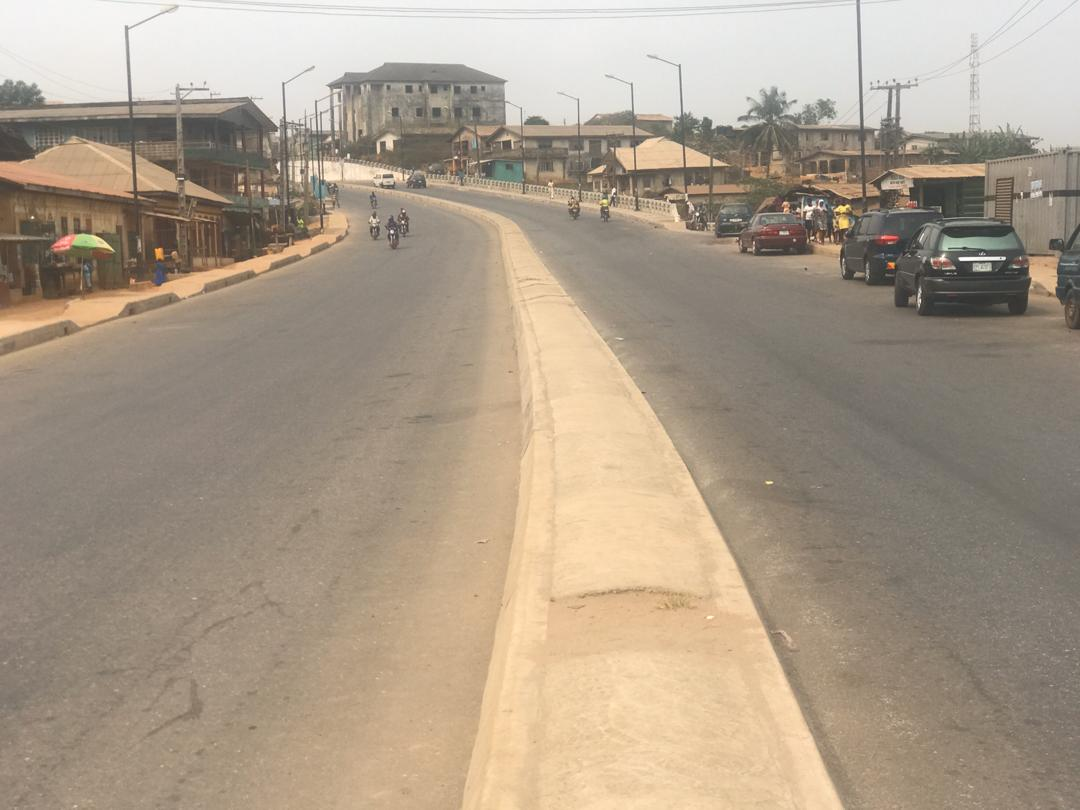
Epe express road

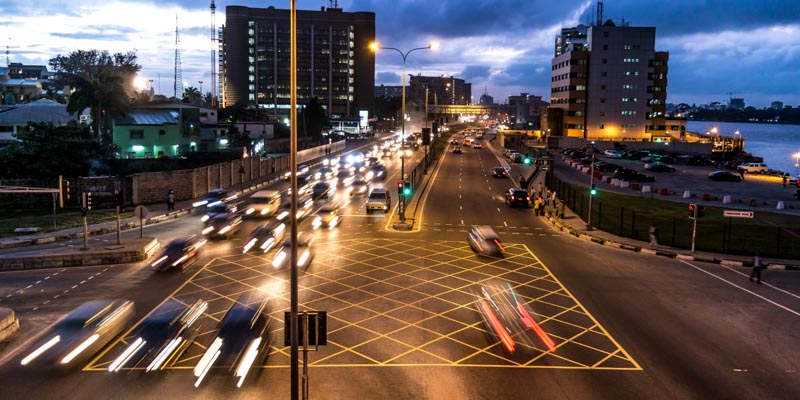
Lekki-Epe Expressway Sandfill Bustop

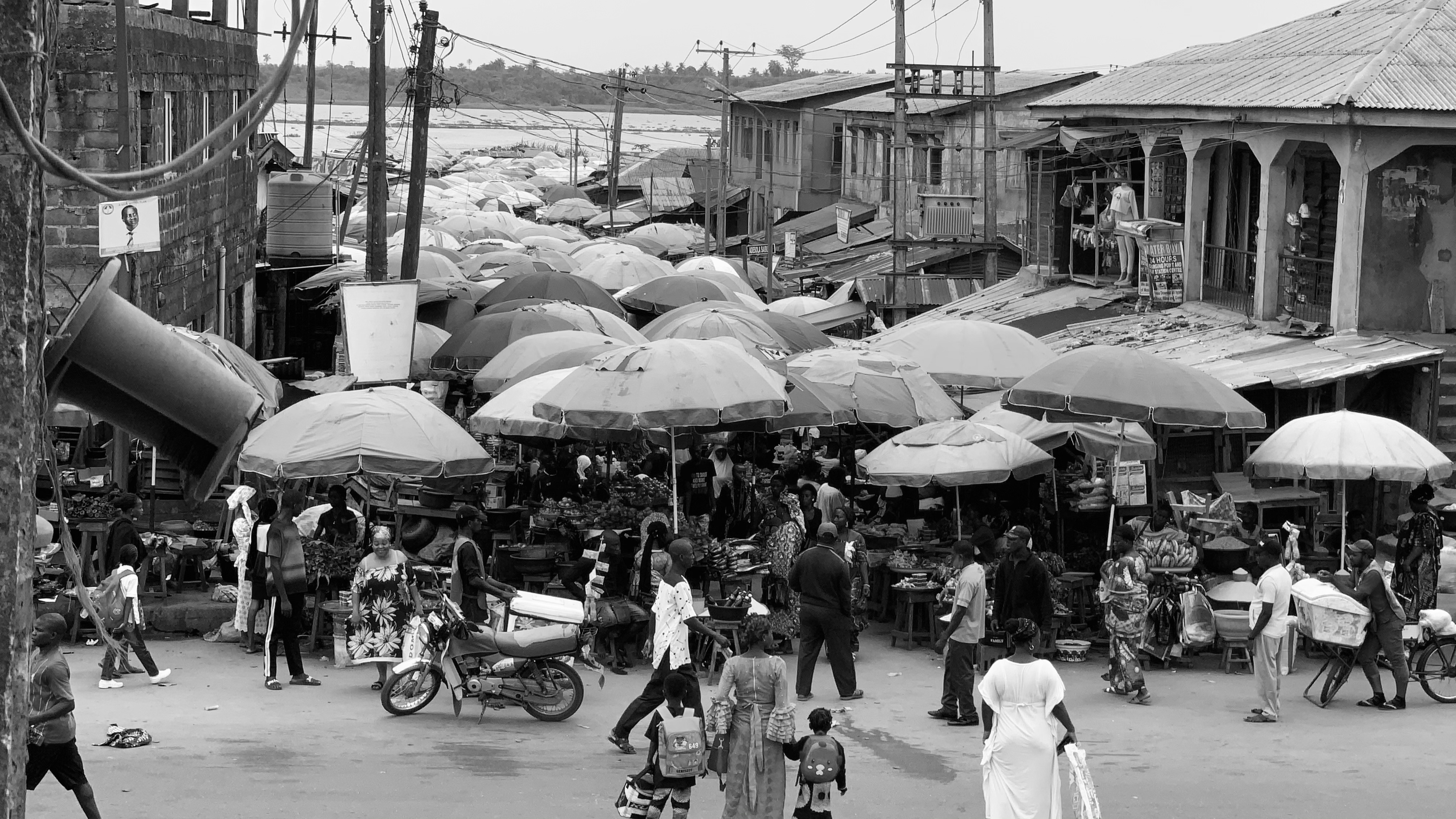
Epe market

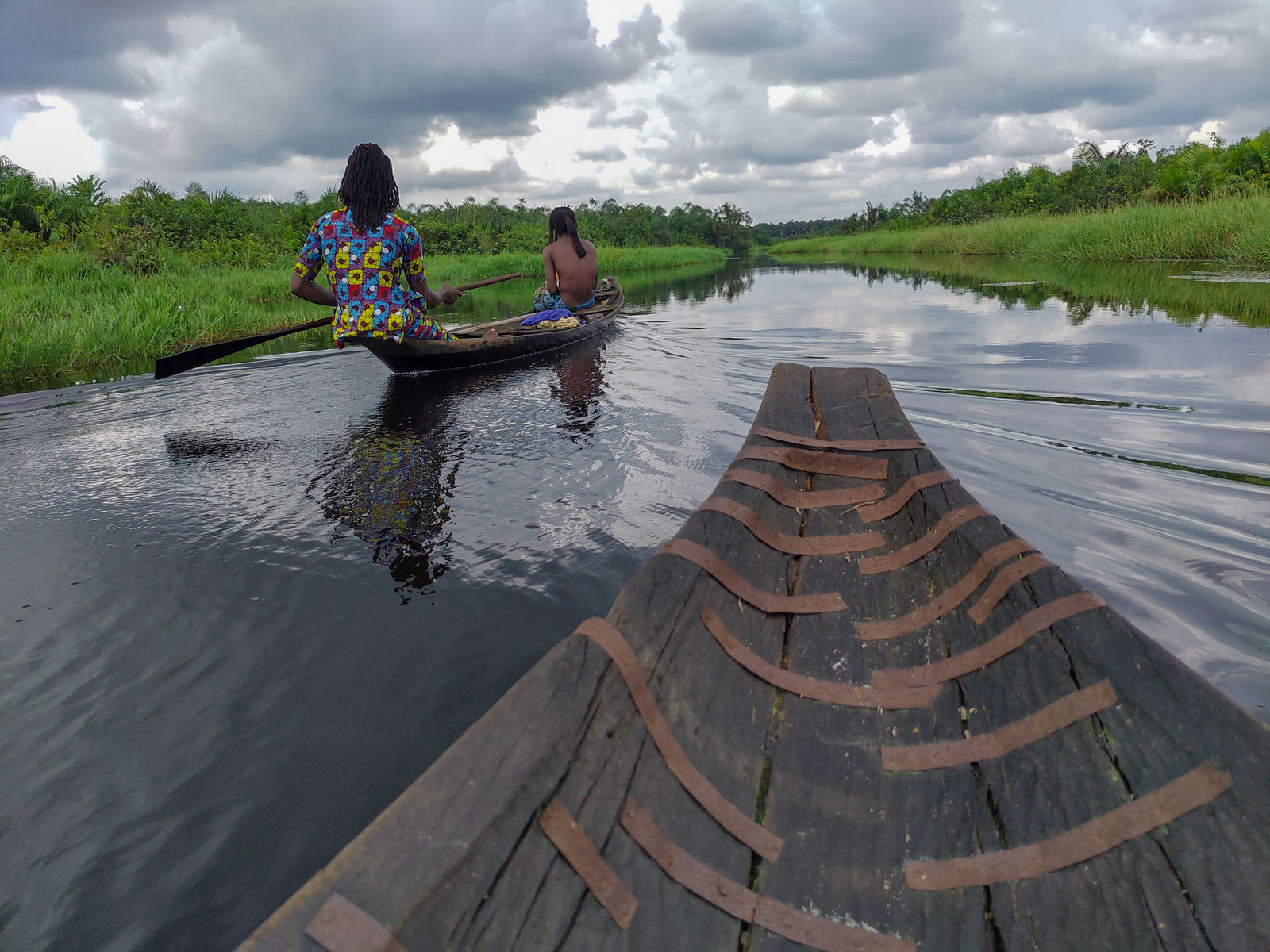
Epe mangrove

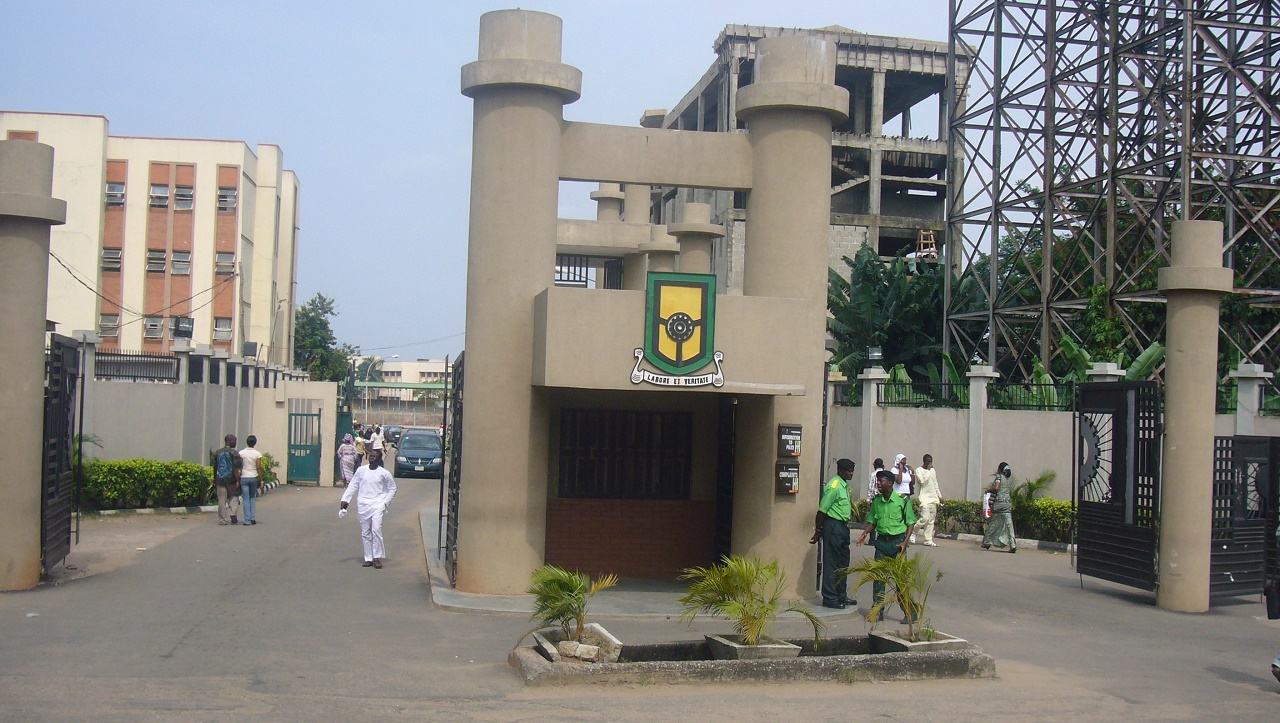
Yaba college of technology gate

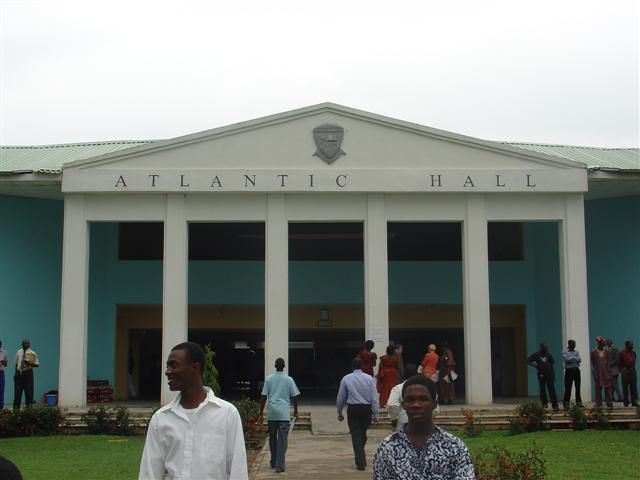
Atlantic Hall, Epe
