= Raji Rasaki =

Nigerian politician and general (born 1947)

Brigadier General Raji Rasaki

Military Governor of Ogun State
- In office 1986 – December 1987
- Preceded by: Oladayo Popoola
- Succeeded by: Mohammed Lawal

Military Governor of Ondo State
- In office 17 December 1987 – July 1988
- Preceded by: Ekundayo Opaleye
- Succeeded by: Bode George

Military Governor of Lagos State
- In office July 1988 – December 1991
- Preceded by: Navy Captain Mike Akhigbe
- Succeeded by: Michael Otedola

Personal details
- Born: 7 January 1947 (age 79) Ibadan, Southern Region, British Nigeria (now in Oyo State, Nigeria)
- Party: Peoples Democratic Party
- Spouse: Fatimat Raji-Rasaki (m. 1976)
- Education: Nigerian Military School, Zaria; Nigerian Defence Academy
- Occupation: Politician; military officer

Military service
- Allegiance: Nigeria
- Branch/service: Nigerian Army
- Years of service: 1970–1993
- Rank: Brigadier General

Raji Alagbe Rasaki (born 7 January 1947) is a retired brigadier general of the Nigerian Army who served as military governor of Ogun State, Ondo State, and Lagos State between 1986 and 1991 during the military administration of General Ibrahim Babangida.

== Background ==
Raji Alagbe Rasaki was born on 7 January 1947 in Ibadan, Nigeria. He received his elementary education at Christ Apostolic Church Primary School, Ita-Olugbode, Ibadan between 1955 and 1960. For his secondary education, he attended Nigerian Military School, Zaria between 1962 and 1966. He then enrolled as an officer-cadet at the Nigerian Defence Academy in September 1967 and graduated in March 1970, when he was commissioned as an officer in the Nigerian Army. He held many command and staff positions: he was Adjutant, Lagos Garrison Signal Regiment (1970–71), Commanding Officer Second Signal Regiment, Commander Signal Support Brigade (1978–79), Commander Army Signal Corps, Commander Army Headquarters Garrison & Signal Group.

== Military governor ==
Raji Rasaki was a one-time military governor of Ogun State (1986–87) before his re-deployment to the nation's economic nerve center, Lagos State, becoming that state’s military governor in 1988. Soon after, he embarked on a massive demolition exercise of illegal structures to rid the State of shanties. That singular act resulted in the re-vitalization of Lagos, and a boom in the real estate market. It also earned him the nickname of "acsion governor" (action governor), a mockery of the way in which he referred to himself.

A member of the armed forces ruling council, he gained national prominence during the 22 April 1990 unsuccessful coup against the Ibrahim Babangida regime. The plotters led by the late Major Gideon Orkar had attempted to overrun the then seat of the Federal Government, Dodan Barracks, and in that process killed Babangida’s Aide de Camp, Major U.K. Bello. Late Major Orkar had announced many far-reaching declarations, which included radical restructuring of the federation bordering on the excision of five core northern States until the coup was foiled by officers loyal to Babangida. The first announcement to this effect came from the then military governor of Lagos state, Col. Raji Rasaki, who declared in a radio broadcast that the rebellion was already being contained.

== Later career ==
Following his retirement from the military in 1993, Rasaki wrote several policy papers and memoirs. In addition he pursued a career as a statesman, participating in numerous conferences and forums. As a public speaker, he addressed audiences across the country and abroad. In 2005 he joined the Nigerian Peoples Democratic Party (PDP).

In 2016, he celebrated 40 years of his marriage to Senator Fatimat Olufunke Raji-Rasaki.
