= 2019 Lagos State gubernatorial election =

2019 election to choose the Governor of Lagos State

- 9 March 2019
- Turnout: 35.6%
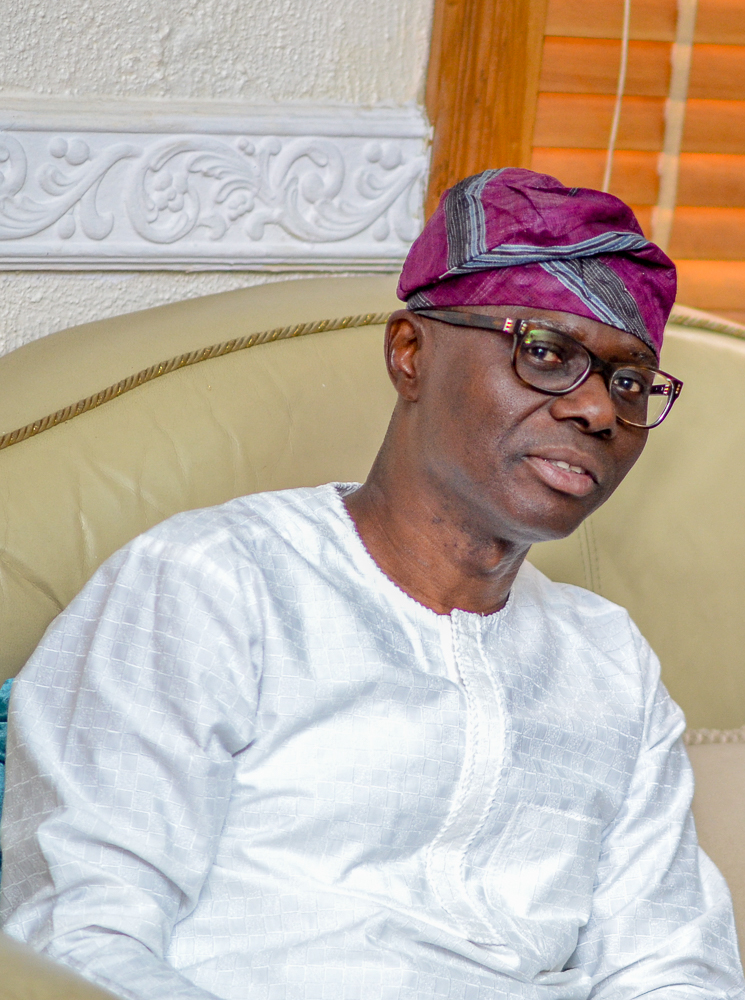

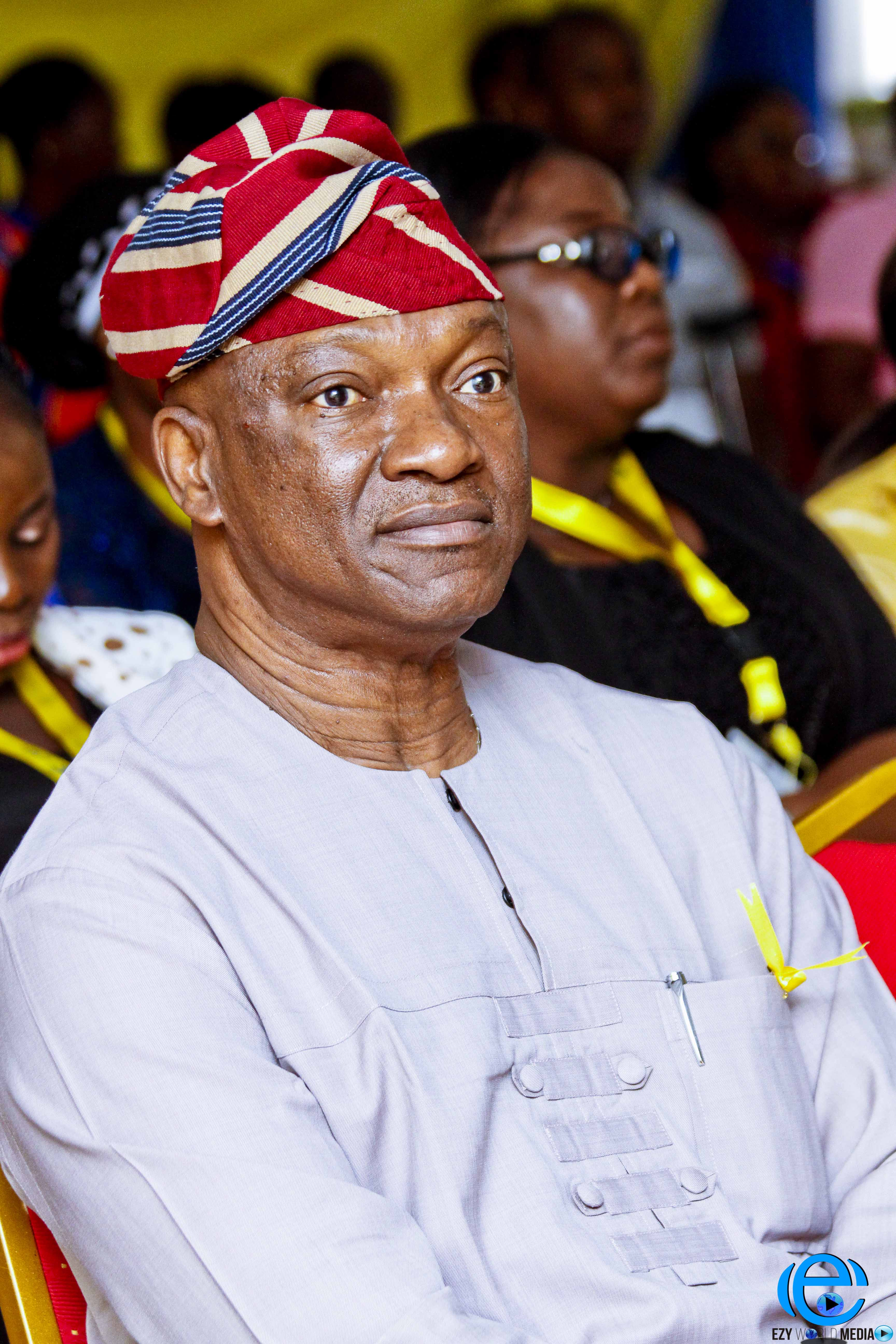
Nominee	Babajide Sanwo-Olu	Jimi Agbaje
Party	APC	PDP
Running mate	Femi Hamzat	Haleemat Busari
Popular vote	739,445	206,141
Percentage	75.65%	21.09%
Home municipality	Lagos Island	Shomolu
Local governments carried	20	0
Governor before election
Akinwunmi Ambode
APC
Elected Governor
Babajide Sanwo-Olu
APC

The 2019 Lagos gubernatorial election was conducted on 9 March to choose the Governor of Lagos State. The election was held concurrently with various state level elections. Incumbent APC Governor Akinwunmi Ambode lost to the APC flag bearer Babajide Sanwo-Olu at a direct primary election in October 2018 and hence ineligible to run for second term under APC. Babajide Sanwo-Olu won in a landslide against Jimi Agbaje of the PDP who had previously run unsuccessfully for Lagos state governor twice. From 1999, Lagos state has been governed by AD, AC, then ACN, three parties which subsequently formed part of the coalition that birthed the APC in 2013.

== APC primary ==
=== Candidates ===
==== Declared ====
- Akinwunmi Ambode, incumbent Governor of Lagos.
- Babajide Sanwo-Olu, Lagos State Minister of Establishments, Training and Pensions and former managing director of LSPDC.

==== Declined ====
- Femi Hamzat, businessman (endorsed Sanwo-Olu and later became his running mate)

== PDP primary ==
=== Candidates ===
==== Declared ====
- Jimi Agbaje, pharmacist and candidate for Governor in 2007 and 2015
- Deji Doherty, businessman

==== Declined ====
- Femi Otedola, Oil mogul

== Other governorship aspirant and party ==
- Chief Owolabi Salis, AD
- Princess Adebisi Ogunsanya, YPP
- Babatunde Olalere Gbadamosi, ADP
- Muyiwa Fafowora, ADC
- Barrister Ladipo Johnson, ANP
- Mrs. Omolara Adesanya, PPC
- Funsho Awe, NCP

== General election ==
=== Results ===
Lagos State gubernatorial election, 2019
Party	Candidate	Votes	%	±%
APC	Babajide Sanwoolu	739,445	76.65	
PDP	Jimi Agbaje	206,141	21.09	
ADP	Babatunde Gbadamosi	4,780	0.49	
A	Joseph Beckley	4,122	0.42	
ADC	Olumuyiwa Fafowora	3,544	0.36	
YPP	Princess Adebisi Ogunsanya	1,604	0.16	
Majority		958,032	98.01	
Turnout		1,122,416		
APC hold		Swing		

== See also ==
- 2019 Nigerian general election
- Governor of Lagos
- 2019 Nigerian National Assembly election in Lagos State
- 2019 Nigerian gubernatorial elections
