= 2015 Lagos State gubernatorial election =

- 11 April 2015
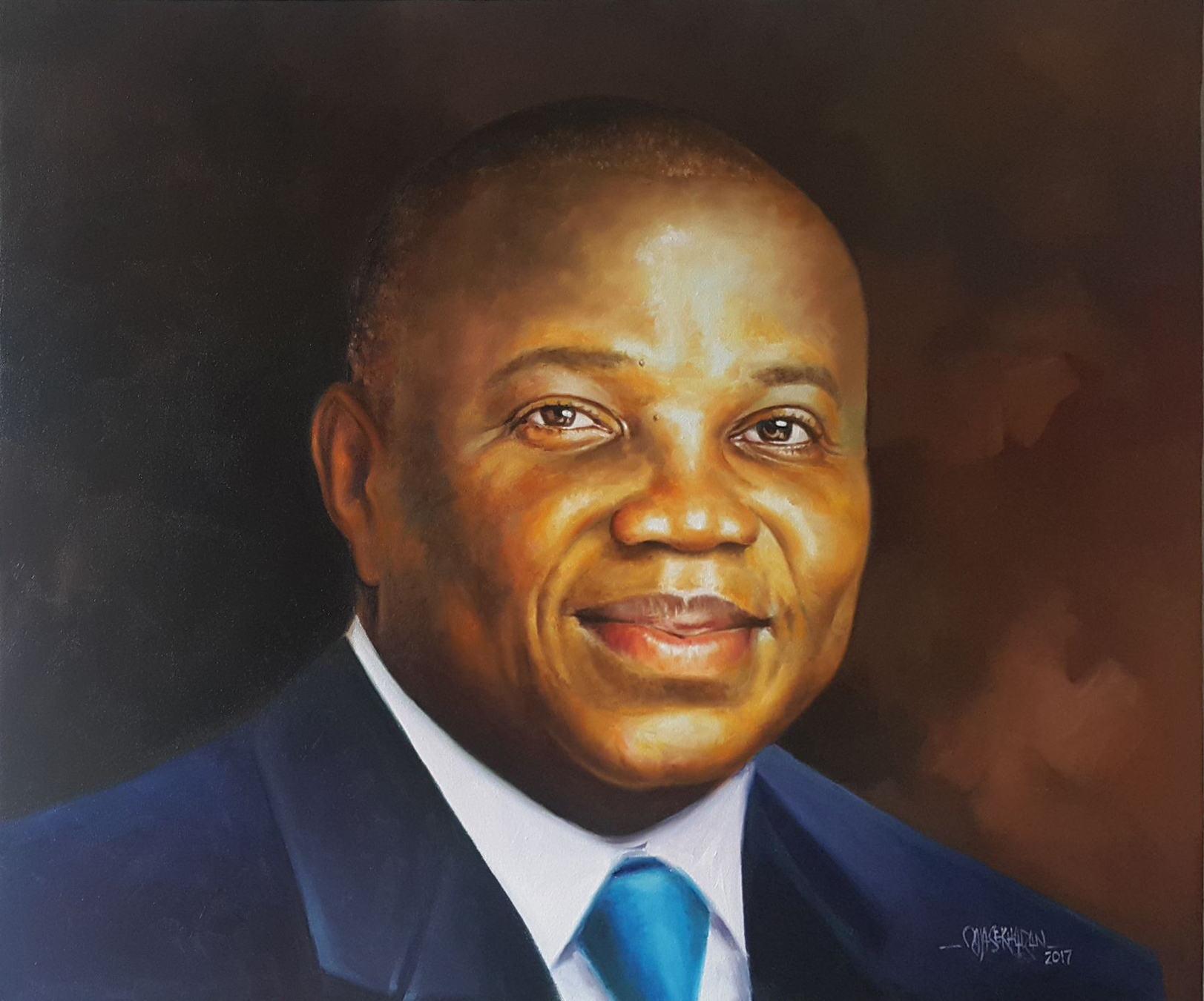

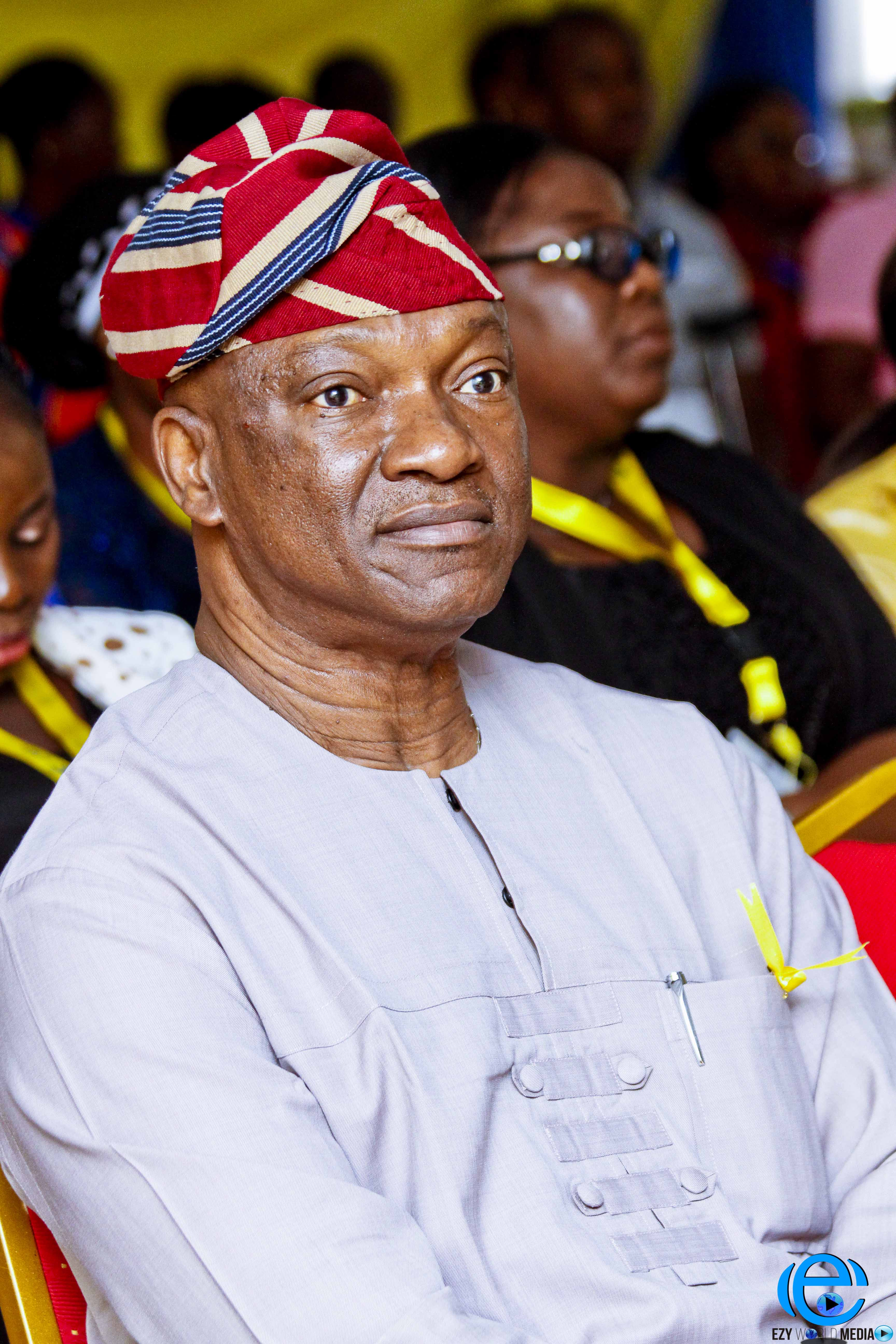
| Nominee | Akinwunmi Ambode | Jimi Agbaje |
| Party | APC | PDP |
| Running mate | Idiat Oluranti Adebule | Safurat Abdulkareem |
| Popular vote | 811,994 | 659,788 |
| Percentage | 54.94 | 44.64 |
governor before election
Babatunde Fashola
APC
Elected governor
Akinwunmi Ambode
APC

An election for Governor of Lagos State took place on 11 April 2015. All Progressives Congress (APC) candidate Akinwunmi Ambode, who is a former accountant general of Lagos State, defeated People's Democratic Party (PDP) candidate Jimi Agbaje and Alliance for Democracy (AD) candidate Bolaji Ogunseye. The governor and deputy governor are elected on the same ticket.

== APC primary ==
APC candidate Akinwunmi Ambode defeated 12 other contestants to clinch the party ticket. He won with 3,735 votes to defeat his closest rival, Obafemi Hamzat (who received 1,201 votes), and Speaker of the Lagos State House of Assembly Adeyemi Ikuforiji, who came in a distant third with 182 votes.

=== Candidates ===
- Akinwunmi Ambode
- Obafemi Hamzat
- Adeyemi Ikuforiji
- Supo Shasore
- Ganiyu Olanrewaju Solomon
- Lekan Pitan
- Tola Kasali
- Tokunbo Agbesanwa
- Abayomi Sutton
- Adekunle Disu
- Tokunbo Wahab
- Lanre Ope

=== Results ===
APC primary results
| Party | Candidate | Votes | % |
|---|---|---|---|
| APC | Akinwunmi Ambode | 3,735 | 66.44 |
| APC | Obafemi Hamzat | 1,201 | 21.04 |
| APC | Ganiyu Olanrewaju Solomon | 272 | 4.76 |
| APC | Adeyemi Ikuforiji | 182 | 3.18 |
| APC | Supo Shasore | 121 | 2.12 |
| APC | Lekan Pitan | 112 | 1.96 |
| APC | Tola Kasali | 68 | 1.19 |
| APC | Adekunle Disu | 9 | 0.15 |
| APC | Tokunbo Wahab | 7 | 012 |
| APC | Lanre Ope | 0 | 0 |
| APC | Abayomi Sutton | 0 | 0 |
| APC | Tokunbo Agbesanwa | 0 | 0 |
| Total votes | | 5,707 | 100 |

== PDP primary ==
=== Candidates ===
- Jimi Agbaje
- Musiliu Obanikoro
- Tokunbo Kamson
- Deji Doherty
- Babatunde Gbadamosi

=== Results ===
PDP primary results
| Party | Candidate | Votes | % |
|---|---|---|---|
| PDP | Jimi Agbaje | 434 | 50 |
| PDP | Musiliu Obanikoro | 346 | 39.86 |
| PDP | Tokunbo Kamson | 46 | 5.29 |
| PDP | Deji Doherty | 21 | 2.41 |
| PDP | Babatunde Gbadamosi | 21 | 2.41 |
| Total votes | | 868 | 100 |

== General election ==
=== Results ===
Lagos State gubernatorial election, 2015
| Party | Candidate | Votes | % | ±% |
|---|---|---|---|---|
| APC | Akinwunmi Ambode | 811,994 | 54.94 | |
| PDP | Jimi Agbaje | 659,788 | 44.64 | |
| Alliance for Democracy (Nigeria) | Bolaji Ogunseye | 6,087 | 0.41 | |
| Majority | | 904,206 | 77.12 | |
| Turnout | | 1477869 | | |
| APC hold | | Swing | | |

== See also ==
- Nigerian National Assembly election, 2015 (Lagos State)
