= Lagos State Ministry of the Environment and Water Resources =

Ministry overview
- Jurisdiction: Government of Lagos State
- Headquarters: State Government Secretariat, Alausa, Lagos State, Nigeria
- Ministry executive: Mr Tunji Bello, Commissioner
- Website: https://www.moelagos.gov.ng/

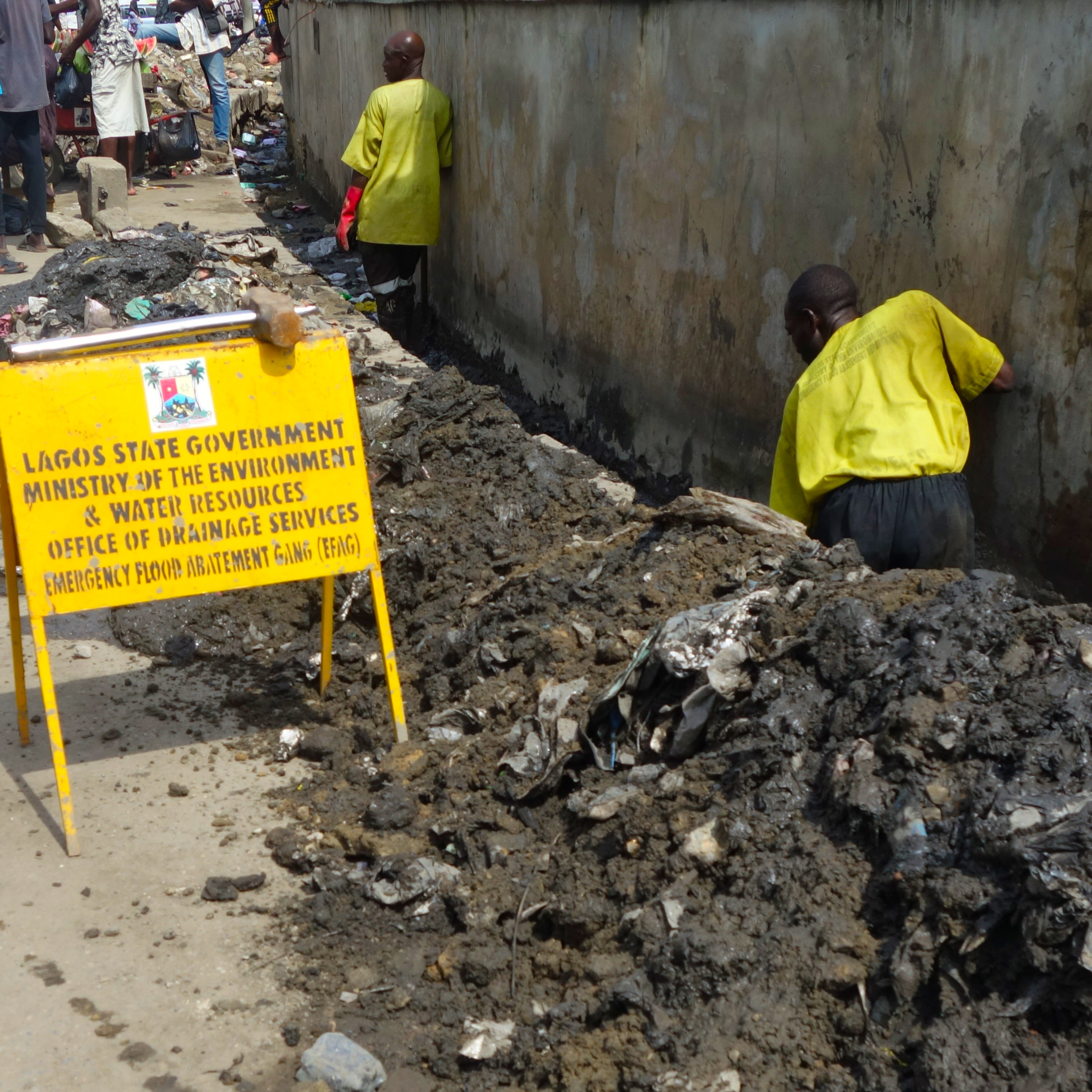

The Lagos Ministry of the Environment and Water Resources was created out of the old Ministry of Works and Transport in 1979 by Alhaji Lateef Jakande, the first elected Governor of Lagos State. The Ministry of Environment and Physical Planning was eventually amalgamated with the Ministry of Physical Planning to form the Ministry of Environment and Physical Planning. In 2003, the administration of Asiwaju Bola Ahmed Tinubu, the past Governor of Lagos State, removed the Environment Office from Physical Planning and raised the current Environment Office to a full-fledged Ministry.

The Ministry's primary goal was to create a clean, healthier, and more sustainable environment that would be conducive to tourism, economic growth, and citizen well-being. In the year 2005, two offices were created under the Ministry:

- Office of Environmental Services (OES)
- Office of Drainage Services (ODS)

The two offices, Office of Environmental Services and Office of Drainage Services, were consolidated into a single Ministry of the Environment in 2015, following an Executive Order by His Excellency, Mr. Akinwunmi Ambode. In January 2018, the Office of Drainage Services was transferred to the Lagos State Public Works Corporation (LSPWC), which is under the Ministry of Works, as part of the Akinwunmi Ambode Administration's Environment Sector reform.

Mr Babajide Sanwo-Olu, the Governor of Lagos State, took the oath of office on May 29, 2019 and promised in his inauguration speech to restore the environmental agencies that had been nearly dormant.

== Parastatals ==
The ministry is in charge of Supervising the following Ministries, Departments, and Agencies, MDAs:

- Lagos State Environmental Protection Agency (LASEPA)
- Lagos State Waste Management Authority (LAWMA)
- Lagos State Parks and Garden Agency (LASPARK)
- Lagos Water Corporation (LWC)
- Lagos State Water Regulatory Commission (LSWRC)
- Lagos State Signage and Advertisement Agency (LASAA)
- Kick Against Indiscipline (KAI)
- Lagos State Waste Water Management Office (LSWMO)

LIST OF PAST COMMISSIONERS
S/N	NAMES	PERIOD
1	MR. ALABI MASHA	1979
2	MR. N. A. KEKERE EKUN	1987
3	MR. TEMILOLA KEHINDE	1990 – 1992
4	ENGR. ASHIM ADEBOWALE OYEKAN	1994 – 1995
5	ENGR. GBENGA ASHAFA	1995
6	MRS. FUNMILAYO DA-SILVA	1997
7	ARC. KAYODE ANIBABA	1999 – 2003
8	MR. TUNJI BELLO	2003 – 2007
9	DR. MUIZ ADEYEMI BANIRE	2007 – 2011
10	MR. TUNJI BELLO	2011- 2015
11	DR. SAMUEL BABATUNDE ADEJARE	2015 – 2018
12	MR. BABATUNDE DUROSINMI-ETTI	2018 – 2019
