= 2007 Lagos State gubernatorial election =

2007 gubernatorial election in Lagos State, Nigeria

- 14 April 2007
Nominee	Babatunde Fashola	Musiliu Obanikoro
Party	AC	PDP
Running mate	Sarah Adebisi Sosan
Popular vote	599,300	383,956
Governor before election
Bola Tinubu
AD
Elected Governor
Babatunde Fashola
AC

The 2007 Lagos State gubernatorial election occurred on 14 April 2007. Babatunde Raji Fashola of the AC defeated other candidates, by polling 599,300 votes, PDP's Musiliu Olatunde Obanikoro was closest contender with 383,956 votes.

Babatunde Fashola emerged the ACN candidate at the gubernatorial primary election. His running mate was Sarah Adebisi Sosan.

Of the 22 candidates who contested in the governorship election, 20 were male, only two were female. Among the deputies, 18 were male, four were female.

== Electoral system ==
The Governor of Lagos State is elected using the plurality voting system.

== Primary election ==
=== PDP primary ===
The PDP governorship primary election was in the main bowl of the National Stadium Surulere, Lagos, on held on Saturday 9 December 2006, and lasted about 48 hours. There were 6,100 accredited delegates in attendance from across the state. Wife of the party's late gubernatorial aspirant Funsho Williams, Hilda Funsho-Williams, led with 2,597 votes; Senator Musiliu Obanikoro followed closely with 2,195 votes. Others like Engr. Kamson polled 683 votes, Senator Wahab Dosunmu had 253 votes, Prince Ademola Adeniji Adele got 190 votes, Engr. Adedeji Doherty got 73 votes, Chief Tunde Fanimokun polled 61 votes, Arch. Kayode Anibaba had 18 votes, Mrs. Abosede Oshinowo got 17 votes, and Sir Babatunde Olowu polled one vote. There were some voided votes. The Chairman of the Electoral Panel, Rear Admiral Babatunde Ogundele (rtd), according to Vanguard Nigeria, however, announced the failure of Funsho-Williams to secure the required 50% win. It was Musiliu Obanikoro, however, who got to be nominated as the party's candidate.

=== Candidates ===
- Party nominee: Musiliu Obanikoro
- Running mate:
- Hilda Funsho-Williams: de facto winner.
- Kamson
- Adedeji Doherty
- Wahab Dosunmu
- Babatunde Olowu
- Kayode Anibaba
- Ademola Adeniji Adele
- Abosede Oshinowo
- Tunde Fanimokun

== Results ==
A total of 22 candidates registered with the Independent National Electoral Commission to contest in the election. The AC candidate, Babatunde Fashola, won, defeating PDP' Musuliu Obanikoro, DPA's Jimi Agbaje, and 19 other minor party candidates. The total number of registered voters in the state was 4,204,000.

Candidate	Party	Votes	%
Babatunde Raji Fashola	Action Congress (AC)	599,300	51.48
Musiliu Olatunde Obanikoro	People's Democratic Party (PDP)	383,956	32.98
Jimi Agbaje	DPA	114,557	9.84
Tokunbo Afikuyomi	All Nigeria Peoples Party (ANPP)	66,411	5.70
Olufemi Pedro	Labour Party (LP)		
Hakeem Akinola Gbajabiamila	Alliance for Democracy (AD)		
Adeshina Bola Lateef Olayokun	All Progressives Grand Alliance (APGA)		
Elizabeth O. Adiukwu Bakare	PPA		
Wilton Olabode	United Nigeria People's Party (UNPP)		
Olufemi Ayinde Ojo	Action Alliance (AA)		
Christopher A. B. Obatunwa	National Conscience Party (NCP)		
Kolawole Ayodele Oja	RPN		
Olufolake Aina Akibola	NDP		
Eric Adebayo Daga	NNPP		
Ibrahim Olusegun Folorunsho	Democratic People's Party (DPP)		
Ayaneze Brian O.	African Democratic Congress (ADC)		
Randle O. Obasanmi	Better Nigeria Progressive Party (BNPP)		
Lawrence Adeniyi Oladipupo Johnson	Nigeria Advance Party (NAP)		
Gausudeen Omotilewa Arolambo	Accord (A)		
Uchenna Ohimai Ehimiaghe	Fresh Democratic Party (FRESH)		
Owolabi Salis	APN		
Franklin Adedeji Akintilo	ARP		
Total		1,164,224	100.00
Source: INEC, NDI
