= Oluwaseun Osiyemi =

Nigerian banker and politician

Hon. Oluwaseun Osiyemi

Commissioner for Transportation of Lagos State
- Incumbent
- Assumed office September 2023
- Governor: Babajide Sanwo-Olu

Personal details
- Born: Lagos State, Nigeria
- Education: Bangor University
- Occupation: Banker, entrepreneur, politician

Oluwaseun Osiyemi is a Nigerian banker, entrepreneur, and politician. Since September 2023, he has served as Commissioner for Transportation in Lagos State.

== Education ==
Osiyemi obtained a Chartered Banker Master of Business Administration (MCIBS) degree from Bangor University.

== Career ==
He held roles in the banking industry and served as a Director at Proctor House Company Limited.

In September 2023, Governor Babajide Sanwo-Olu appointed him Commissioner for Transportation in Lagos State. During his tenure, the ministry introduced the use of Intelligent Transport System (ITS) sites in partnership with Huawei Technologies, aimed at improving road safety and monitoring compliance with traffic regulations.

== Recognition ==
Osiyemi was awarded a Fellowship of the Chartered Institute of Transport Administration of Nigeria (CITAN).
