= Palace of the Akran of Badagry =

Traditional palace in Badagry, Lagos State, Nigeria

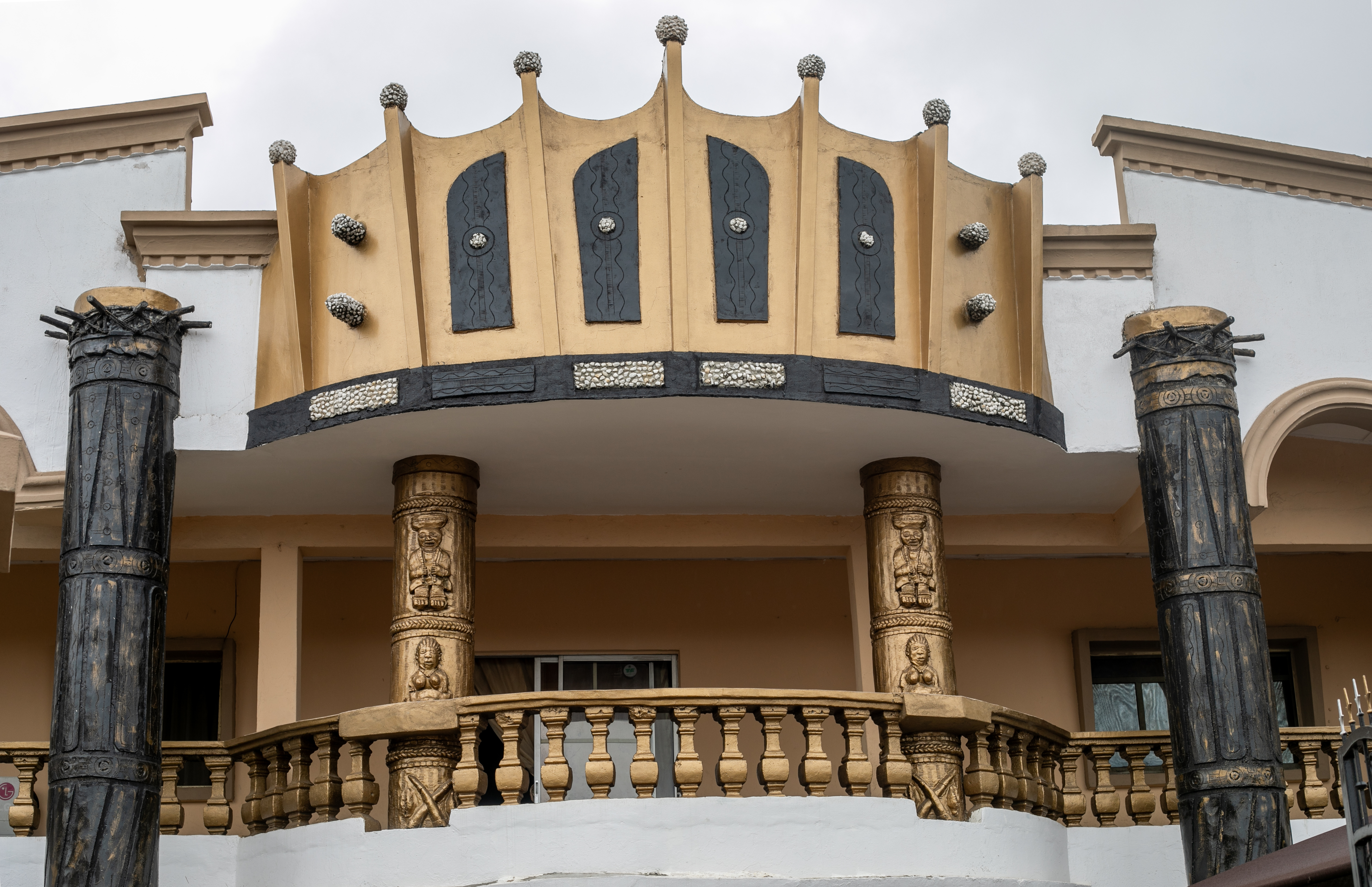
- The palace in September 2024

Palace of the Akran of Badagry is the traditional seat and official residence of the Akran of Badagry, the paramount ruler of Badagry Kingdom in Lagos State, Nigeria. Located in the Jegba Quarter of Badagry, the palace serves as the ceremonial and administrative headquarters of the Akran institution and remains an important centre of traditional authority in the historic coastal town.

== History ==
The palace is closely associated with the Akran institution, one of the oldest traditional rulership systems in Lagos State. As the residence of successive Akrans of Badagry, it has served as a centre for traditional administration, community leadership, and cultural preservation.

During the reign of Oba Babatunde Akran (De Wheno Aholu Menu-Toyi I), who ruled from 1977 until his death in 2026, the palace played a prominent role in community affairs and engagements with government institutions.

In January 2026, the palace became the focal point of mourning activities and official condolence visits following the death of Oba Babatunde Akran. The events were attended by government officials, traditional rulers, religious leaders, and members of the Badagry community.

== Cultural significance ==
The palace remains one of the principal traditional institutions in Badagry. It serves as a venue for royal ceremonies, chieftaincy affairs, customary dispute resolution, and cultural activities connected with the traditional leadership of Badagry Kingdom.

The palace is also regarded as a symbol of the historical continuity of the Akran institution and the cultural identity of the people of Badagry.

== Contemporary developments ==
In 2026, Lagos State Governor Babajide Sanwo-Olu announced plans to construct a new central palace for Badagry during activities held at the Akran's Palace following the death of Oba Babatunde Akran. The proposed project was part of broader commitments to support traditional institutions and preserve the cultural heritage of Badagry.

== See also ==
Akran of Badagry

Badagry

Badagry Heritage Museum

Traditional rulers in Lagos State
