= Femi Pedro =

Nigerian politician and economist (born 1955)

His Excellency, Ambassador (Dr.) Femi Pedro
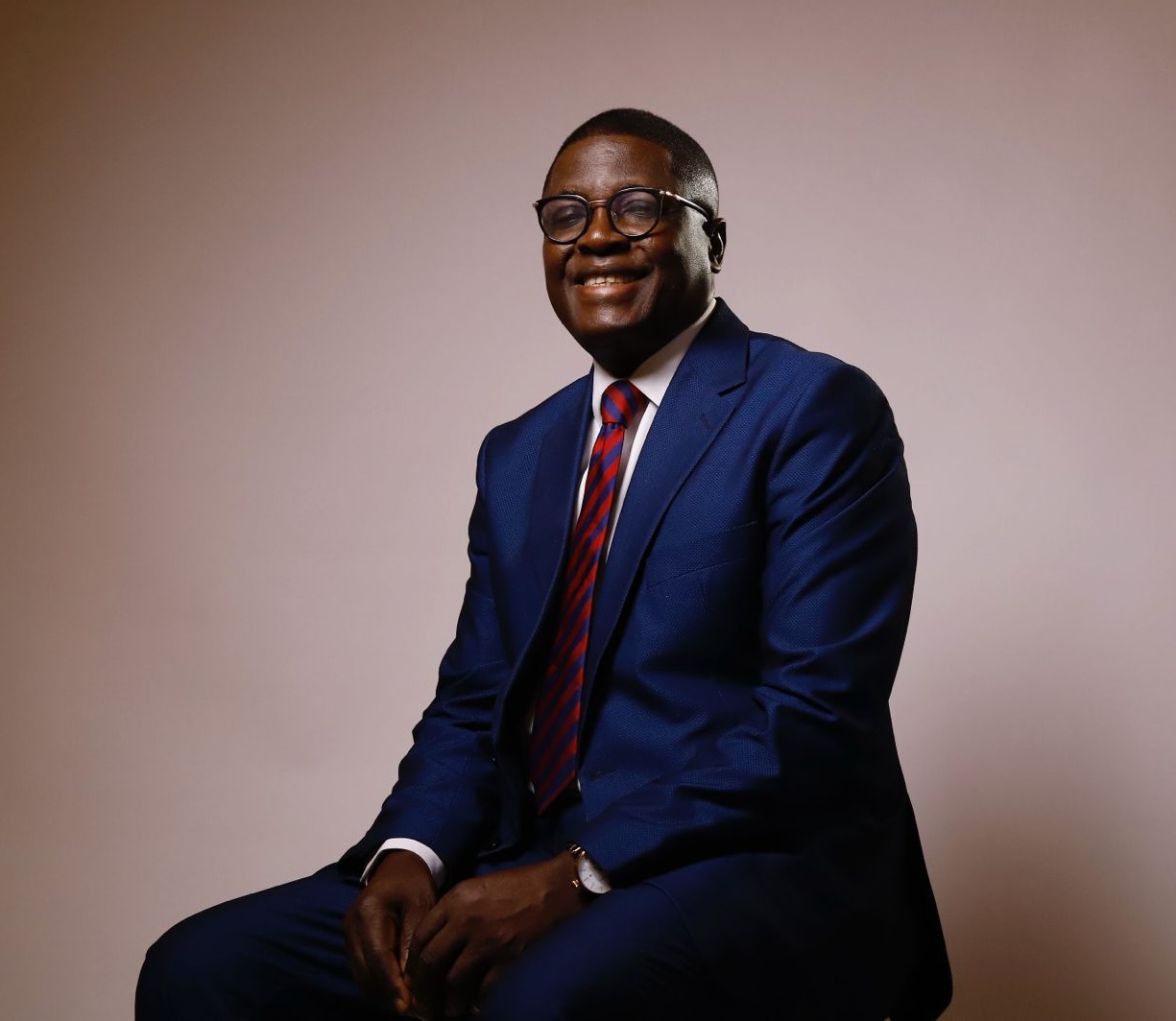

Ambassador and High Commissioner of the Federal Republic of Nigeria to Australia, New Zealand, Fiji, Solomon Islands and the Oceanic States
- Incumbent
- Assumed office 1 June 2026
- Appointed by: Bola Ahmed Tinubu

Deputy Governor of Lagos State
- In office 14 January 2003 – 10 May 2007
- Governor: Bola Tinubu
- Preceded by: Kofoworola Bucknor
- Succeeded by: Abiodun Ogunleye

Personal details
- Born: Olufemi Olusegun Pedro; 29 January 1955 (age 71) Lagos Island, Lagos, British Nigeria (now Lagos, Lagos State, Nigeria)
- Party: All Progressives Congress (2013–present)
- Other political affiliations: Alliance for Democracy (1998–2006); Action Congress of Nigeria (2006); Labour Party (2006–2009); Peoples Democratic Party (2009–2013)
- Spouse: Jumoke Pedro
- Education: University of Wisconsin–Superior; Wichita State University
- Occupation: Diplomat; Politician; Economist

Otunba Olufemi "Femi" Olusegun Pedro (born 29 January 1955) is a Nigerian diplomat, politician and economist who served as deputy governor of Lagos State from 2003 to 2007. Before his election alongside Bola Tinubu, he was a co-owner and the chief executive officer of First Atlantic Bank, now FinBank.

In November, 2025, Femi Pedro was nominated by President Bola Tinubu to serve as an ambassador of the Federal Republic of Nigeria. In March, 2026, it was announced that Femi Pedro would serve as Nigeria's Ambassador Extraordinary and Plenipotentiary to Australia, New Zealand, Fiji, Solomon Islands and the Oceanic States. Pedro officially resumed his tour of duty as the High Commissioner on the 23rd of June, 2026 after presenting his Letter of Credence to Her Excellency, Ms. Sam Mostyn- the Governor-General of the Commonwealth of Australia. On the 28th of October, 2026, Ambassador Femi Pedro formally presented his Letter of Credence to His Excellency Naiqama Lalabalavu, President of the Republic of Fiji, at the State House in Suva, Fiji. With the presentation of his credentials, he formally assumed responsibility as Nigeria’s High Commissioner to Fiji, in addition to his responsibilities as Nigeria’s High Commissioner to Australia and the broader Oceanic region.

Femi Pedro was appointed by President Muhammadu Buhari as the chairman of the Small and Medium Enterprise Development Agency of Nigeria (SMEDAN) from 2018 to 2022, and was appointed by Governor Akinwunmi Ambode as the founding chairman of the Lagos State Sports Trust Fund. He is also the current chairman of the Business and Government Relations Committee at the Chartered Institute of Bankers of Nigeria (CIBN). A member of the Nigerian chieftaincy system, Pedro holds the title of Otunba and often uses it as a pre-nominal honorific.

== Personal Life and Education ==
=== Early childhood ===
Femi Pedro was born in Lagos Island to Pa Olajide Pedro, an Aguda retired officer of the defunct Western Nigeria Marketing Board, Ikeja, and Modupe Pedro (née Abayomi) on 29 January 1955. Pedro is a descendant of Pa Sanusi Adeyinka Pedro, whose father settled in the Shomolu area of Lagos before moving to Bamgbose Street in Popo Aguda, Lagos Island.

=== Education ===
Pedro received a Bachelor of Science in economics from the University of Wisconsin–Superior (1976–1978) and a master's degree in economics from Wichita State University (1979–1981).

=== Family ===
He is married to Honourable Justice Jumoke Pedro, a High Court judge in Lagos and the Chairman of the Lagos Multi-Door Courthouse .

== Business Career ==
Pedro started his banking career in 1982 when he joined the Central Bank of Nigeria (CBN). He rose to the post of assistant manager in 1985, and became a research economist. In 1986, he was admitted as an associate of the Chartered Institute of Bankers, London, United Kingdom. He worked at First City Merchant Bank (now First City Monument Bank) afterwards in 1988, where he became the executive assistant to the bank's chairman and chief executive officer Chief Subomi Balogun. He became the deputy manager and head of corporate planning in the same year.

Pedro became one of the first investors in Guaranty Trust Bank with Fola Adeola, Tayo Aderinokun, Gbolahan Osibodu, Femi Akingbe, and Akin Opeodu. He later took up a senior managerial role at its inception in 1990, and was responsible for opening a multitude of its branches across the southern and northern parts of Nigeria. He served in various capacities at the bank until 1997, when he voluntarily retired. On the eve of his retirement, he was admitted to the fellowship of Chartered Institute of Bankers of Nigeria (CIBN).

In January 1998, Pedro ventured into private business as the chairman of Agro-Corp Ventures Limited, a commodity processing company. The same year (Nov 1998), he was appointed managing director and CEO of Comet Merchant Bank (now FinBank, following the acquisition of the bank by a consortium of investors including himself).

== Political Career ==
In his years as the deputy governor, Pedro was appointed chairman of Lagos State Revenue Mobilization committee. They restructured, reorganised and re-engineered the Board of Inland Revenue. His experience in the banking sector helped increase Lagos State's internally generated revenue from a rate of 300 million naira per month to 7 billion naira within eighteen months. He was popularly referred to as "Mr. Pedronomics", primarily due to his affinity towards micro and macro-economic policies.

Pedro introduced and implemented the PSP and waste management model that is currently used in Lagos. He was also in charge of conducting extensive research in Brazil with other cabinet members to study and understand the novel metropolitan bus transport system which resulted in the BRT.

=== Gubernatorial run ===
On 13 December 2006, Pedro dumped the Action Congress to declare under the Labour Party. He became the first-ever Nigerian to contest for a gubernatorial election under the Labour Party platform. On 30 January 2007, Pedro named Oluranti Adebule as his running mate for the 19 April elections.

=== 2011 elections ===
On 24 September 2010 Pedro declared his intention to run for the 2011 governorship election in Lagos State on the platform of Peoples Democratic Party, PDP. He was subsequently appointed as executive vice-chairman of the PDP South West Fund Mobilization Team, which was put together by the presidency to lead the PDP efforts to raise substantial funds for elections in the southwest.

=== Reconciliation with Tinubu and return to APC ===
Throughout 2013, indications of reconciliation became evident between Tinubu and Pedro, who had fallen apart in the buildup to the 2007 elections. The Oba of Lagos publicly and privately encouraged the reconciliation after Tinubu attended the wedding ceremony of Pedro's son in 2012, which was the first time they had been publicly seen together since 2006.

In December 2013, Pedro reportedly held a secret meeting with Tinubu, the Rivers State Governor, Rotimi Amaechi, and the interim National Chairman of APC, Chief Bisi Akande, to finalise his move back to APC. Within a matter of days of the report breaking out, Pedro released a statement confirming the allegations.

=== Post-2015 political appointments ===
Within days of his return to APC, Pedro was appointed as the chairman of the APC Registration Exercise Committee in February 2014 in Ondo State.

On 12 February 2018, he was appointed as the pioneer chairman of the Lagos State Sports Trust Fund.

On 1 March 2018, Pedro was appointed by President Muhammadu Buhari as the chairman of the board of directors of the Small and Medium Enterprises Development Agency of Nigeria (SMEDAN).

On 2 October 2022, Pedro was appointed to the Council of the Lagos State Governor’s Advisory Council, GAC, the highest decision-making body of the All Progressives Congress in Lagos State, Nigeria.

== Ambassadorial Appointment ==
In November, 2025, Femi Pedro was nominated by President Bola Tinubu to serve as an ambassador of the Federal Republic of Nigeria. In March, 2026, it was announced that Femi Pedro would serve as Nigeria's Ambassador Extraordinary and Plenipotentiary to Australia, New Zealand, Fiji, Solomon Islands and the Oceanic States. Pedro officially resumed his tour of duty as the High Commissioner on the 23rd of June, 2026 after presenting his Letter of Credence to Her Excellency, Ms. Sam Mostyn- the Governor-General of the Commonwealth of Australia. On the 28th of October, 2026, Ambassador Femi Pedro formally presented his Letter of Credence to His Excellency Naiqama Lalabalavu, President of the Republic of Fiji, at the State House in Suva, Fiji. With the presentation of his credentials, he formally assumed responsibility as Nigeria’s High Commissioner to Fiji, in addition to his responsibilities as Nigeria’s High Commissioner to Australia, New Zealand, Solomon Islands and the broader Oceanic region

== Conferrment of Honorary Doctorate Degree ==
On 10 April 2025, Pedro was conferred with an Honorary Doctorate Degree (PhD Honoris Causa) in Business (Banking, Entrepreneurship, and National Development) by the Lagos State University (LASU) at its 28th Convocation Ceremony.

== See also ==
- Bola Ahmed Tinubu
- Babajide Sanwo-Olu
- Femi Hamzat
- Babatunde Raji Fashola
- Akinwunmi Ambode
