= Federal Ministry of Housing and Urban Development =

Nigerian government ministry

Ministry overview
- Jurisdiction: Government of Nigeria
- Headquarters: Mabushi, Abuja, Nigeria; 9.0729°N 7.4146°E
- Minister responsible: Dr. Muttaqha Rabe Darma
- Parent Ministry: Federal Government of Nigeria

The Federal Ministry of Housing and Urban Development is a ministry of the Government of Nigeria responsible for the formulation and implementation of national policies on housing, urban development, and land administration. The ministry serves as the coordinating authority for housing policy in Nigeria and oversees federal and state-level housing initiatives.

== History ==
The responsibilities currently held by the Ministry of Housing and Urban Development in Nigeria were historically administered by ministries responsible for infrastructure as a whole. Prior to 2019, these responsibilities were managed by the Federal Ministry of Power, Works and Housing.

In 2019, President Muhammadu Buhari approved a restructuring of the federal cabinet, which included splitting the Ministry of Power, Works and Housing into separate entities in an effort to improve efficiency and service delivery. The restructuring followed concerns about the effectiveness of the combined Power ministry, with it being argued in the Vanguard that separating the ministry would be a positive development.
