= Funke Femi Adepoju =

Nigerian administrator and technocrat

Funke Femi Adepoju (25 September 1969) is a Nigerian public administrator and technocrat. She is the Director-General of the Administrative Staff College of Nigeria (ASCON) and previously served as the General Manager of the Lagos State Water Regulatory Commission (LASWARCO).

== Education ==
Adepoju received her first and second degrees in English and Education Management in 1989 and 1993 from Lagos State University (LASU) and the University of Ilorin (UNILORIN), respectively. She earned a Master of Business Administration (MBA) from LASU in 1998 and a PhD in Educational Management.

== Career ==
=== Lagos State Public Service ===
In 1991, Adepoju started her career as an Assistant Project Officer (Education) under the Federal Government of Nigeria/European Economic Community Middle Belt Programme. She later joined the Lagos State Public Service, where she rose to the position of Director. In 2019, Adepoju was appointed by the Lagos State Governor Babajide Sanwo-Olu as General Manager of the Lagos State Water Regulatory Commission (LASWARCO).

=== Director-General of ASCON ===
In May 2025, President Bola Tinubu appointed Adepoju Director-General of ASCON, which is responsible for training senior public and private sector officials in administration, leadership, and management to enhance innovation and accountability in governance.

== Awards and recognition ==
Adepoju is a Fellow of the Nigerian Institute of Water Engineers, the Institute of Corporate Administration, the Association of Human Resource Practitioners, and the Chartered Institute of Local Government and Public Administration. On 7 November 2025, ASCON, under her leadership, won the Most Creative Trainer of the Year (Corporate Category – Public Sector) award by the National Institute of Training and Development (NITAD). In September 2025, she was awarded the 2025/2026 AIG Visiting Fellowship at the AIG-Blavatnik School of Government, University of Oxford, United Kingdom.
