= Palace of the Ayangburen, Ikorodu =

Palace of the King of Ikorodu

The Palace of Ayangburen in Ikorodu, Lagos. It is a monarch palace where the Oba is elected in as the king of the Ayangburen kingdom. There have been different monarchs who have been kings over the land but the most popular of them is The Ayangburen of Ikorodu, Oba Salaudeen Oyefusi (Oguntade II) Born on 8 July 1931, Oyefusi was installed Ayangburen of Ikorodu in September 1971. He died on Saturday at the age of 83, 2014.

After the death in 2024, the 8 kings Makers Lisa, Odofin, Solomade, Oponua, Apena, Oluwo, Losi and Aro; but Aro and Losi also joined their Ancestors after the death of Oyefusi in 2014. Oba Kabiru Adewale Shotobi as the new Ayangburen of Ikorodu, he was installed by the governor Babatunde Raji Fashola in 2014 as the 20th Ayangburen of Ikorudu.

== Oba Kabiru Adewale Shotobi ==
Oba Kabiru Adewale Shotobi born in February 1954. Became the Ayangburen of Ikorodu in December 2014. He became the 20th king of Ikorodu after the death of Oba Salaudeen Oyefusi on 2 August 2014.

He was installed by the then governor of Lagos State Babatunde Fashola. He was elected by the 8 king marker out of the 24 prince who were eligible to be the Ayangburen.
