= Jimi Agbaje =

Nigerian pharmacist and politician

Jimi Agbaje OON
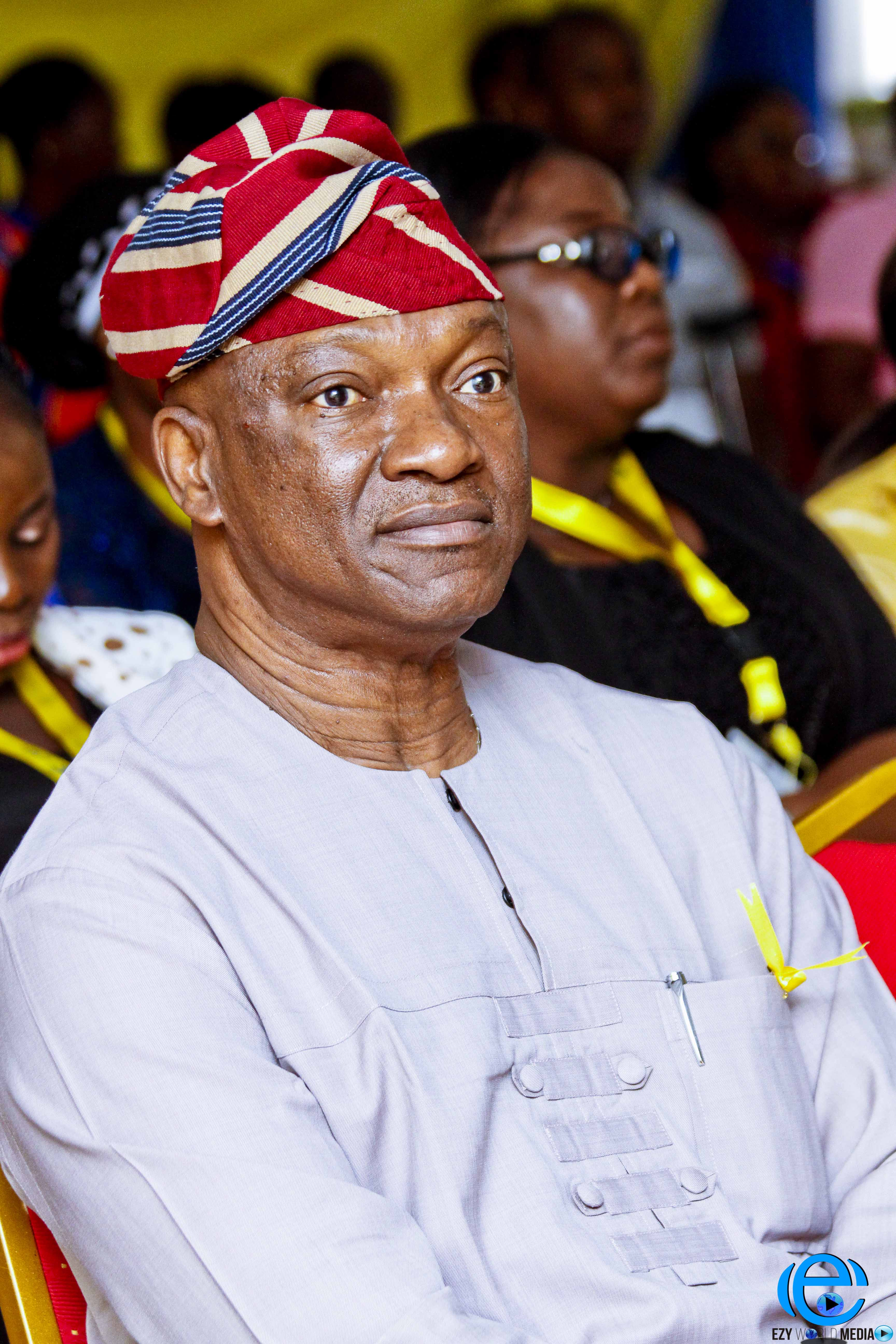

Personal details
- Born: Olujimi Kolawole Agbaje; 2 March 1957 (age 69) Lagos, Lagos State, Nigeria
- Party: Peoples Democratic Party (PDP)
- Spouse: Abiola Agbaje (née Bankole) (1982–present)
- Education: St Gregory's College, Lagos; University of Ife (now Obafemi Awolowo University)
- Occupation: Pharmacist, Politician
- Website: www.jimiagbaje.com

Olujimi Kolawole Agbaje (born 2 March 1957), popularly known as Jimi Agbaje, is a Nigerian pharmacist and politician who was a candidate for the governorship of Lagos State in 2007, 2015, and 2019.

== Early life ==
Agbaje was born on 2 March 1957 to Chief Julius Kosebinu Agbaje, a banker, and Margaret Olabisi, a schoolteacher. He is the second of five children, and his siblings include Segun Agbaje, CEO of Guaranty Trust Bank.

== Professional career ==
In 1982, Agbaje founded JayKay Pharmaceutical and Chemical Company Limited, and was managing director until 2005, when he entered politics. He was a member of the Pharmacists Council of Nigeria (1999–2006), National Secretary of the Nigerian Association of General Practice Pharmacists (1987–1990), National Chairman of the association (1990–1993) and Chairman, Lagos State branch of the Pharmaceutical Society of Nigeria (1994–1997). He was a member, Lagos State Task Force on Fake and Adulterated Drugs (1989–1993), National Drug Formulary and Essential Drugs List (1986–1993) and Lagos Hospitals Management Board (1994–1997).

Agbaje sits on the board of other organisations including Oakwood Park Ltd., Atlantic Hall Secondary School in Epe, Lagos, the Jimi Agbaje Outreach (a foundation set up to help the poor) and has served as business mentor at Fate Foundation.

== Political career ==
In a 2013 interview with The Punch, Agbaje said that his entry politics was prompted by the annulment of the Moshood Abiola presidential election: "I saw the annulment as a personal insult and an assault on the Nigerian people. This led to my first entry into what I would call activism, working with other concerned professionals such as Prof. Pat Utomi, Dr Ayo Ighodaro, Asue Ighodalo, Billy Lawson, Oby Ezekwesili, Tola Mobolurin and Hassan Odukale."

Based on his affiliation with Afenifere, Jimi Agbaje joined the Action Congress (AC), his first political party. In 2007, after initially seeking the AC's gubernatorial ticket, he left to join the Democratic People's Alliance (DPA). He was among the 11 aspirants that defected from the AC following allegations that Governor Bola Tinubu had already chosen his preferred successor before the party primaries.

Agbaje contested the 2007 Lagos State gubernatorial election on the DPA platform, against Musiliu Obanikoro of the Peoples Democratic Party (PDP) and Femi Pedro of the Labour Party (LP), but lost to Babatunde Raji Fashola of the AC.

He left the DPA in 2011 and joined the PDP following the deregistration of DPA by the Independent National Electoral Commission (INEC).

On 29 October 2014, he formally declared his intention to contest the 2015 Lagos gubernatorial elections by picking up the PDP nomination form. On 8 December 2014, he emerged as the party’s candidate defeating Musiliu Obanikoro, a former Minister of State for Defence.

In October 2018, Agbaje again secured the PDP's ticket defeating Adedeji Doherty, but lost to Babajide Sanwo-Olu of the All Progressives Congress (APC), in the gubernatorial election held on 9 March 2019.

== Professional positions ==
He has held various professional positions, including:

- National Secretary Nigerian Association of General Practice (1987–1990)
- National Chairman of Nigerian Association of General Practice Pharmacists (1990–1993)
- Chairman of the Pharmaceutical Society of Nigeria (1994–1997)
- Chairman of the 1994 National Conference Planning Committee of the Pharmaceutical Society of Nigeria.

== Awards and fellowships ==
- Merit Award Winner (MAW), Pharmaceutical Society of Nigeria (Lagos State chapter)
- Fellow, Pharmaceutical Society of Nigeria (FPSN)
- Fellow, West African Post Graduate College of Pharmacists (FPCPharm)

== Personal life ==
Agbaje is married to Abiola Agbaje (née Bankole), a lawyer, and they are said to have met as students at the University of Ife (now Obafemi Awolowo University). They have three children.

== See also ==
- Lagos State
- Lagos politicians
