= 2027 Lagos State gubernatorial election =

2027 gubernatorial election in Lagos State, Nigeria

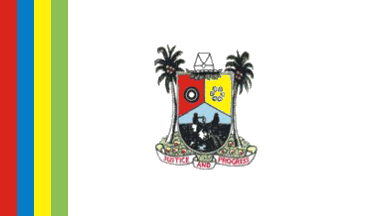
- 6 February 2027

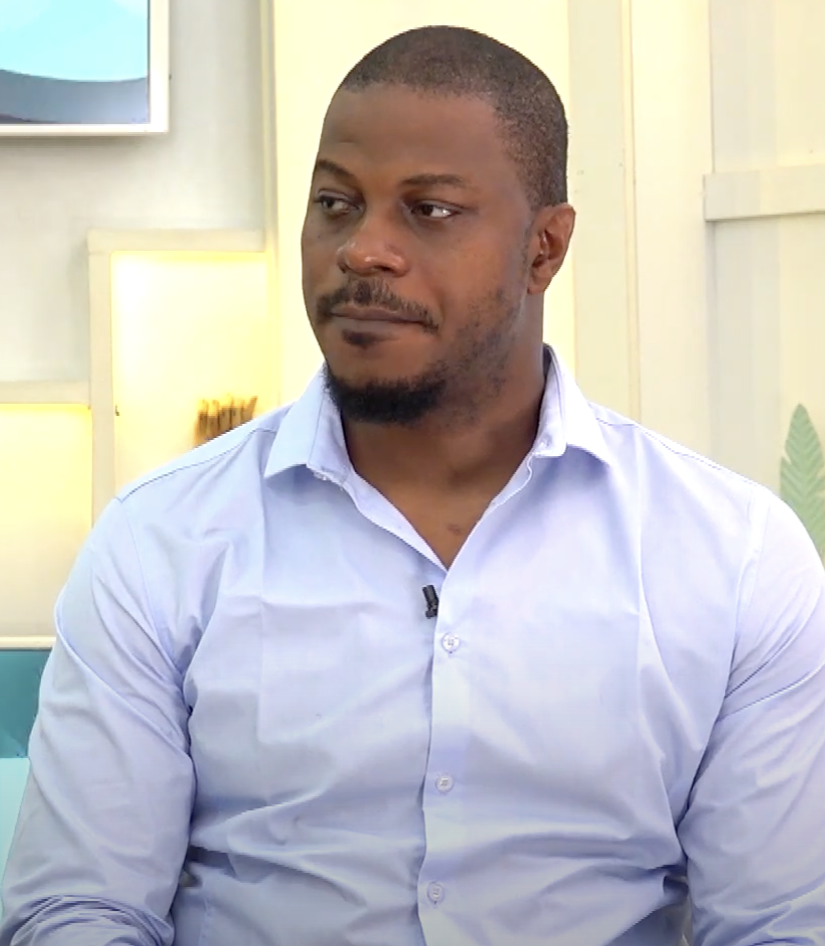
Nominee	Kadri Obafemi Hamzat	Adedeji Doherty	Gbadebo Rhodes-Vivour
Party	APC	PDP	ADC
Running mate	Princess Damilola Sonayon James	Mrs. Khadijat Bello	Gbadamosi Olalere
Nominee	Prince Laja Adeoye
Party	APM
Running mate	Coker Oluwatobi Adeyemi Grace
Incumbent Governor
Babajide Sanwo-Olu
APC

The 2027 Lagos State gubernatorial election is set to hold on the 6th of February, 2027 to elect the Governor of Lagos State, concurrent with elections to the Lagos State House of Assembly as well as 27 other gubernatorial elections and elections to all other state houses of assembly. Incumbent APC Governor Babajide Sanwo-Olu, who has served two terms since 2019, is term-limited and thus ineligible to run for the 2027 Lagos State gubernatorial election, making this an open-seat race in which Deputy Governor Kadri Obafemi Hamzat emerged as the APC nominee after winning the party's primary on 21 May 2026.

== Electoral system ==
The Governor of Lagos State is elected using a modified two-round system. To be elected in the first round, a candidate must receive the plurality of the vote and over 25% of the vote in at least two-thirds of state local government areas. If no candidate passes this threshold, a second round will be held between the top candidate and the next candidate to have received a plurality of votes in the highest number of local government areas.

== Background ==
Lagos State is a highly populated, diverse southwestern state in Nigeria, that is a major financial centre along with being a culture, education, and transportation hub. Although it faces overcrowding and chronic traffic, it has grown to one of the largest economies in Africa, contributing about one-third of Nigeria's GDP.

Politically, unlike the 2019 election cycle, when the APC's control of Lagos State continued as late president Muhammadu Buhari won the state by 12%, the party retained its State House of Assembly majority, and Babajide Sanwo-Olu won the gubernatorial election, the 2023 elections produced a split result in Lagos State when Labour Party's nominee Peter Obi narrowly won the state's presidential vote with a 0.77% margin over APC's nominee and former Lagos governor Bola Tinubu. Despite this, the APC retained firm control down-ballot, sweeping all three Senate seats, winning 20 of 24 House of Representatives seats, and retaining 38 of 40 seats in the State House of Assembly. Governor Sanwo-Olu was re-elected in the concurrent gubernatorial election, defeating Labour Party's Gbadebo Rhodes-Vivour and PDP's Abdul-Azeez Olajide Adediran.

Ahead of his second term, Sanwo-Olu's included gender equality, social inclusion and youth development to his initiaan T.H.E.M.E.S (Transportation and Traffic Management, Health and Environment, Making Lagos a 21st Century Megacity, Entertainment and Tourism, Security and Governance) Agenda. In terms of performance, his administration recorded growth in the state's internally generated revenue, which rose from approximately ₦895 billion in 2023 to about ₦1.3 trillion in 2024, alongside continued investment in the Lagos Rail Mass Transit system, the Lekki Deep Sea Port, and healthcare infrastructure. Local media outlets have reported persistent flooding, particularly along the Lekki corridor, and an unresolved housing deficit despite the administration's reported delivery of over 10,000 housing units. As Sanwo-Olu was constitutionally barred from seeking a third term, his deputy, Kadri Obafemi Hamzat, emerged as the APC's endorsed successor, winning the party's primary on 21 May 2026 against Olanrewaju Jim-Kamal, who had just one vote.

== Primaries ==
=== APC Primaries ===
Ahead of the primary, businessman Abdul-Azeez "Jandor" Adediran and Samuel Ajose had picked up nomination forms to contest but withdrew before the primary election, leaving Deputy Governor Kadri Obafemi Hamzat and Olanrewaju Jim-Kamal as the two candidates on the ballot. The primary was held on 21 May 2026 across 245 wards in Lagos State's 20 local government areas. Announcing the results at the collation centre at the APC Secretariat in Ikeja, returning officer, retired General Jonathan Temlong, declared Hamzat the winner with 657,917 votes to Jim-Kamal's one vote.

Party	Candidate	Votes	%
APC	Kadri Obafemi Hamzat	657,917	99.99%
APC	Olanrewaju Jim-Kamal	1	0.01%
Total votes		657,918	100.00%

=== PDP Primaries ===
Ahead of the 2027 election, the Lagos State PDP was split by a broader leadership crisis within the national party, with rival factions loyal to different national leaders competing for control. In April 2026, one faction, led by state chairman Amos Fawole, publicly backed businessman Adelaja Adeoye as its preferred candidate and distanced the party from former state chairman Adedeji Doherty, who had also declared interest in the ticket.

Despite this, Doherty went on to secure the nomination. On 24 May 2026, he was adopted as the party's consensus candidate, a route the Electoral Act 2026 allows as an alternative to a competitive primary, after being endorsed by delegates and stakeholders from all 20 of Lagos State's local government areas. Olalekan Rotimi, chairman of the party's Governorship Primary Electoral Committee for Lagos, declared Doherty the "duly returned gubernatorial candidate" of the PDP.

=== ADC Primaries ===
The African Democratic Congress held its Lagos State governorship primary on 24 May 2026, amid initial confusion over the outcome, with competing claims of victory circulating before any official result was announced. Oladimeji Fabiyi, chairman of the Lagos State ADC primary election committee, subsequently declared Gbadebo Rhodes-Vivour, the Labour Party's 2023 gubernatorial candidate, as the winner, with some reports crediting him with 12,948 votes against a closest challenger's 6,183. However, the result was disputed by a group of the party's local government area chairmen, who alleged that Rhodes-Vivour had in fact placed third among the contestants, behind Princess Abiodun Oyefusi and Afeez Olasunkanmi Salis, and cautioned Lagosians against accepting the announced outcome. On 26 August 2026, businessman Babatunde Gbadamosi was unveiled as Rhodes-Vivour's running mate.

=== APM Primaries ===
The Allied Peoples Movement (APM) affirmed Prince Laja Adeoye, a real estate entrepreneur, as its consensus governorship candidate on 28 May 2026, during a primary and candidate affirmation held in Yaba, Lagos. Godwin Williamson, chairman of the APM Governorship Primary Electoral Committee for the state, declared that Adeoye had been adopted by delegates and stakeholders from all 20 of Lagos State's local government areas, in line with the Electoral Act's provision for consensus candidate selection. State APM chairman Bunmi Adeyemo said the affirmation reflected the wishes of the party's leadership and delegates. Adeoye unveiled a governance blueprint titled "Àtunto Èkó 1.0: Re-Engineering Lagos for Inclusive Prosperity," and called for unity within what he described as a PDP–APM alliance ahead of the general election.

== Candidates ==
Source
Number	Candidates	Party	Age
#1	Sowore Otitoloju Robert	A	58
#2	Salawu Kamarudeen	AA	47
#3	Sol-Nuyi Oluwadamola Adesoca	AAC	55
#4	Gbadebo Rhodes-Vivour	ADC	43
#5	Bolaji Nasir Adewale	ADP	73
#6	Hamzat Kadri Obafemi	APC	62
#7	Adeoye Adelaja Azeez	APM	45
#8	Adeyemi Abiola	APP	49
#9	Odunaike Oluwapamilerin Olurotimi	LP	49
#10	Doherty Olufunso Adeshina	NDC	58
#11	Obadia Akinola	NDP	56
#12	Onifade Ademoyegun Taiwo	NNPP	62
#13	Onigbokun Ademola Joseph	NRM	53
#14	Doherty Adedeji Olugbemiga	PDP	64
#15	Olaniyi Olufemi	SDP	52
#16	Taiwo Temitope Elijah	YPP	46
#17	Peter Helen Ojotule	ZLP	36
