= Mufutau Olatunji Hamzat =

Nigerian banker and monarch (1932–2019)

Oba Mufutau Olatunji Hamzat (1932–2019) was a Nigerian banker and monarch. He was a member of Lagos State House of Assembly in 1979 and later as the commissioner for transportation from 1979 to 1983.

== Life ==
Hamzat was born in 1932. He attended Christ School, Ilubirin, Lagos, for his secondary education in 1995. He obtained a banking certificate through extramural lessons from University of Ibadan and was employed by Afribank in 1966. He was a member of Lagos state House of Assembly in 1979 and later appointment as the commissioner for transportation, a position he held till the end of the Second Nigerian Republic. He was an oba through his maternal lineage. He was married to Kehinde Hamzat. His son Femi Hamzat is the current deputy governor of Lagos state.

He died on 12 May 2019.
