= Akran of Badagry =

Paramount traditional ruler of Badagry Kingdom, Lagos State, Nigeria

Akran of Badagry is the title of the paramount traditional ruler of Badagry Kingdom in Lagos State, Nigeria. The institution is one of the oldest traditional rulership systems in Lagos State and serves as the custodian of the customs, traditions, and cultural heritage of the people of Badagry.

The Akran occupies a prominent position among traditional rulers in Lagos State and has historically played important political, diplomatic, and cultural roles within Badagry and its surrounding communities.

== History ==
Badagry emerged as an important commercial and political centre on the West African coast during the eighteenth and nineteenth centuries. The institution of the Akran developed as the highest traditional authority within the kingdom and was responsible for governance, diplomacy, and the administration of customary affairs.

The title is associated with the Jegba ruling quarter of Badagry, from which successive occupants of the throne have emerged.

== Roles and responsibilities ==
The Akran serves as the paramount traditional ruler of Badagry Kingdom and performs ceremonial, cultural, advisory, and conflict-resolution functions. The office is responsible for preserving traditional institutions, promoting cultural heritage, and representing the interests of the kingdom in engagements with government authorities and other traditional rulers.

== Notable Akrans ==
=== Oba Claudius Dosa Akran ===
Oba Claudius Dosa Akran was a traditional ruler and politician who represented Badagry in the Western House of Assembly and later served as a minister in the government of the Western Region during Nigeria's First Republic.

=== Oba Babatunde Akran (De Wheno Aholu Menu-Toyi I) ===
Oba Babatunde Akran reigned from 1977 until his death in 2026, making him one of the longest-serving traditional rulers in Lagos State.

Before ascending the throne, he worked as a teacher and journalist. During his reign, he was associated with cultural preservation, tourism promotion, and community development initiatives within Badagry Kingdom.

== Palace ==
The official residence of the Akran is the Palace of the Akran of Badagry, located in the Jegba Quarter of Badagry. The palace serves as the ceremonial and administrative headquarters of the institution and hosts traditional ceremonies, community meetings, and royal functions.

== Cultural significance ==
The institution of the Akran remains an important symbol of the cultural identity and historical continuity of Badagry. The office plays a significant role in preserving local traditions, oral history, and indigenous governance systems.

== See also ==
1. Badagry
2. Oba Claudius Dosa Akran
3. Palace of the Akran of Badagry
4. Traditional rulers in Nigeria
5. Lagos State Council of Obas and Chiefs
