= Saleh Mamman =

Nigerian minister of power (born 1958)

Minister of Power
- In office 21 August 2019 – 1 September 2021
- Preceded by: Babatunde Fashola
- Succeeded by: Abubakar Aliyu

Personal details
- Born: Mamman Kwagyang Saleh; 2 January 1958 (age 68) Taraba State
- Party: All Progressive Congress(APC)
- Education: Kaduna Polytechnic; Bayero University Kano

Mamman Kwagyang Saleh (born 2 January 1958) is a convicted former Nigerian government official who served as Minister of Power from August 2019 to September 2021. He was sworn in by President Muhammadu Buhari on 21 August 2019 after being nominated by Buhari and confirmed by the Senate. On 1 September 2021, Mamman was sacked by Buhari and replaced by Minister of State for Works and Housing Abubakar Aliyu.

In May 2026, Saleh was convicted and sentenced to 75 years' imprisonment for fraud and money laundering involving over 33.8 billion naira ($24.7 million) by the Federal High Court of Nigeria. He was arrested in Kaduna State on 19 May.

== Early life and education ==
Saleh is from Taraba State. He holds a higher national diploma in electrical electronics from Kaduna Polytechnic, graduating in 1988. He also holds an MBA in business administration from Bayero University Kano, graduating in 2015.

== Career ==
Saleh started his career in 1981 as a teacher in Technical School, Mubi, Adamawa State. In 1992, he transferred his service to Taraba State. He was promoted to the rank of assistant director in the ministry of works in Taraba State and retired in 2002. After his retirement, he became a full-time businessman and politician.

== See also ==
- Cabinet of Nigeria
