= Oshodi - Abule-Egba BRT Lane =

Oshodi-Abule-Egba Bus Rapid Transit Lane is a 13.65 km lane from the Oshodi to Abule-Egba area of Lagos, Nigeria. The Lane was intended to help 60,000 people who use the facility daily.

== History ==
The Oshodi-Abule-Egba BRT Lane was inaugurated by the Governor of Lagos State, Babajide Sanwo-Olu. The governor emphasized that the trip time would decline from an hour earlier to less than 30 minutes while also adding that 550 high and medium capacity buses would serve the route.
