= Lagos State Water Regulatory Commission =

Nigerian state agency

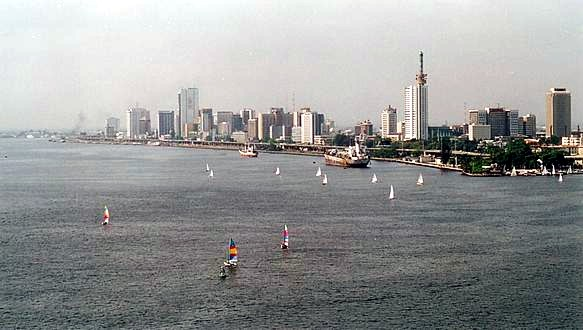
- Abbreviation: LASWARCO
- Formation: 2012
- Headquarters: Lagos State Secretariat, Ikeja
- Location: Lagos, Nigeria
- General Manager: Funke Femi Adepoju
- Website: lswrc.lagosstate.gov.ng

Lagos State Water Regulatory Commission (LASWARCO) is an agency of the Lagos state government under the supervision of the Lagos State Ministry of the Environment and Water Resources. The commission is a regulatory body empowered by "Lagos State Water Sector Law (LSWSL) 2004 and Lagos State Environmental Management Protection Law, 2017" to protect the long term interests of consumers by regulating the activities of individuals, businesses and companies involved in the production, treatment, packaging, distribution, sales, supply and use of water in the state. The commission ensures acceptable standard by curbing unwholesome water production and indiscriminate drilling of boreholes in Lagos state.

The commission began operation in 2012 with the mandate of protecting residents from unhygienic water consumption by ensuring water supply and wastewater management services are properly carried out in the Lagos State. The head office of LSWRC is located at the Lagos State Government secretariat, Ikeja, Lagos State.

== Sectors/companies ==
The commission regulates the activities of sector that use water as a basic raw material for production. The sectors are:

- Beverage companies
- Bottling companies
- Table water companies
- Sachet water companies

== Activities ==
- The commission shutdown 30 water factories for offence committed ranging from unhygienic production environment to failure to comply with regulatory manufacturing practices.
- The commission embarked on an awareness walk to sensitize Lagos residents on the need to value water, while celebrating World Water Day.
- Lagos State Water Regulatory Commission patterned with WaterAid Nigeria to ensure efficiency and improved services of the Water Sector in the state.

== See also ==
- Lagos State Ministry of the Environment and Water Resources
- Lagos State Executive Council
