= 2019 Nigerian National Assembly election in Lagos State =

An election for the National Assembly was held in Lagos State, Nigeria on Saturday, 22 February 2019.

== Results ==
The results of the elections were announced by Prof. Prof. Temitope Ogunmodede. Released on 24 February 2019, the All Progressives Congress emerged victorious over the Peoples Democratic Party, winning most seats.

=== Senate ===
==== Lagos East Senate district ====
Lagos East Senate district election, 2019
Party	Candidate	Votes	%	±%
APC	Bayo Osinowo	-	-	
People's Democratic Party (Nigeria)	Abiodun Oyefusi	-	-	{{{change}}}
Total votes		-	100.00	
APC hold				

==== Lagos West Senate district ====
Lagos East Senate district election, 2019
Party	Candidate	Votes	%	
APC	Solomon Olamilekan Adeola	323,817		
People's Democratic Party (Nigeria)	Gbadebo Rhodes Vivour	243,516	-	{{{change}}}
Total votes		-	100.00	
APC hold				

==== Lagos Central Senate district ====
Lagos Central Senate district election, 2019
Party	Candidate	Votes	%	
APC	Oluremi Tinubu	131,735	-	
People's Democratic Party (Nigeria)	David Onitiri	89,107	-	{{{change}}}
Total votes		-	100.00	
APC hold				

=== House of Representatives ===
As of 15 March 2019, elected members were:

Keys: PDP APC
No.	Constituency	Elected M.H.R	Party	Runner-up	Party	Notes
1	Agege	Samuel Adejare	All Progressives Congress	Adedapo Oluwole	People's Democratic Party	
2	Alimosho	Olufemi Bandele	All Progressives Congress	Akinwale Akinsanya	People's Democratic Party	
3	Epe	Wale Raji	All Progressives Congress	Oyebolaji Ayodeji	People's Democratic Party	
4	Eti-Osa	Obanikoro Ibrahim	All Progressives Congress	Anthony Akala	People's Democratic Party	
5	Ikeja	James Abiodun Faleke	Allied Peoples Movement	Mutiu Olakunle	People's Democratic Party	
6	Lagos Island I	Enitan Badru	All Progressives Congress	Violet Williams	People's Democratic Party	
7	Lagos Island II	Akiolu Kayode	All Progressives Congress	Adama Olagbenga	People's Democratic Party	
8	Lagos Mainland	Jimoh Abdulraheem	All Progressives Congress	Tajudeen Jaiyeola	People's Democratic Party	
9	Mushin I	Alli Adeyemi	All Progressives Congress	Oludayo Bamidele	People's Democratic Party	
10	Mushin II	Bolaji Yusuf	All Progressives Congress	Jude Uchenna	People's Democratic Party	
11	Ojo	Tajudeen Obasa	People's Democratic Party	Durosinmi Murisiku	All Progressives Congress	
12	Ifako/Ijaiye	Owolabi Adisa	All Progressives Congress	Fatimoh Mohammed	People's Democratic Party	
13	Badagry	Adande Babatunde	All Progressives Congress	Seyon Aina	People's Democratic Party	
14	Ibeju Lekki	Balogun Adebayo	All Progressives Congress	Akorede Wasiu	People's Democratic Party	
15	Apapa	Egberongbe Mufutau	All Progressives Congress	Adewole Oludare	People's Democratic Party	
16	Ikorodu	Benson Babajimi	All Progressives Congress	Disu Ramota	People's Democratic Party	
17	Oshodi/Isolo I	Dawodu Bashiru	All Progressives Congress	Mutiu Shadimu	People's Democratic Party	
18	Oshodi/Isolo II	Ganiyu Abiodun	All Progressives Congress	Emmanuel Ugochukwu	People's Democratic Party	
19	Amuwo-Odofin	Ajokpa Oghene	People's Democratic Party	Adegeye-Adeniyi Risikat	All Progressives Congress	
20	Shomolu	Kuye Ademorin	All Progressives Congress	Olowu Oluwaseyi	People's Democratic Party	
21	Kosofe	Agunsoye Oluwarotimi	All Progressives Congress	Olusola Sherifat	People's Democratic Party	
22	Surulere I	Femi Gbajabiamila	All Progressives Congress	Adewara Michael	People's Democratic Party	
23	Surulere II	Olatunji Abiola	People's Democratic Party	Lanre Okunlola	All Progressives Congress	
24	Ajeromi/Ifelodun	Kolawole Taiwo	All Progressives Congress	Orji Rita	People's Democratic Party	

== See also ==
- 2019 Nigerian general election
- 2019 Nigerian House of Representatives elections in Lagos State
- 2019 Nigerian Senate elections in Lagos State
