= Tola Kasali =

Nigerian politician

Lagos State Commissioner for Special Duties
- Incumbent
- Assumed office May 2007

Personal details
- Born: Lekki
- Party: Action People's Congress
- Education: Medical doctor

Tola Kasali is a former chairman of Ibeju-Lekki and two-term commissioner in lagos state. He is a member of the Action Congress of Nigeria (ACN) party now called All Progressive Congress (APC) Party. Kasali came on board the Tinubu administration in the second term in 2003 as Commissioner for Rural Development. He was at home in the ministry until midway into the second term that his boss moved him to another familiar terrain, the Ministry of Health. He resigned from the cabinet to contest the governorship ticket of the Action Congress (AC), which the incumbent governor won. From his last assignment as the Director-General of the BRF (Babatunde Raji Fashola) Campaign Organisation, Kasali took charge of the Ministry of Special Duties as Commissioner.

He ran for governor of lagos state in 2007 and in 2015 under the party APC (All Progressive Congress) but lost in the primaries.

He is currently a member of the Odua Investment board for Western States in which he represents Lagos State.

== Early life and education ==
Tola Kasali was born to the popular Kasali family of Ibeju-Lekki local government; he was raised in the old Epe division of Lagos State. He was a medical doctor from the State Medical Institute of Zaporozhye, Ukrainian Republic, in the old Union of Soviet Socialist Republic (USSR) and grassroots politician from the seaside Ibeju/Lekki community.

== Political career ==
Kasali's foray into administration began when he was elected as the chairman of ibeju-lekki local government. As chairman he started the empowerment programme in the local government, he also encouraged the distribution of bursaries to indigenes of the local government, he was dedicated to improving the lives of people in his constituency. After his tenure, he was appointed a commissioner by asiwaju bola tinubu till 2006."

Kasali was later re-appointed by Governor Fashola to serve with him, a position he held until 2011.
