= Federal Ministry of Power (Nigeria) =

Arm of the Nigerian government

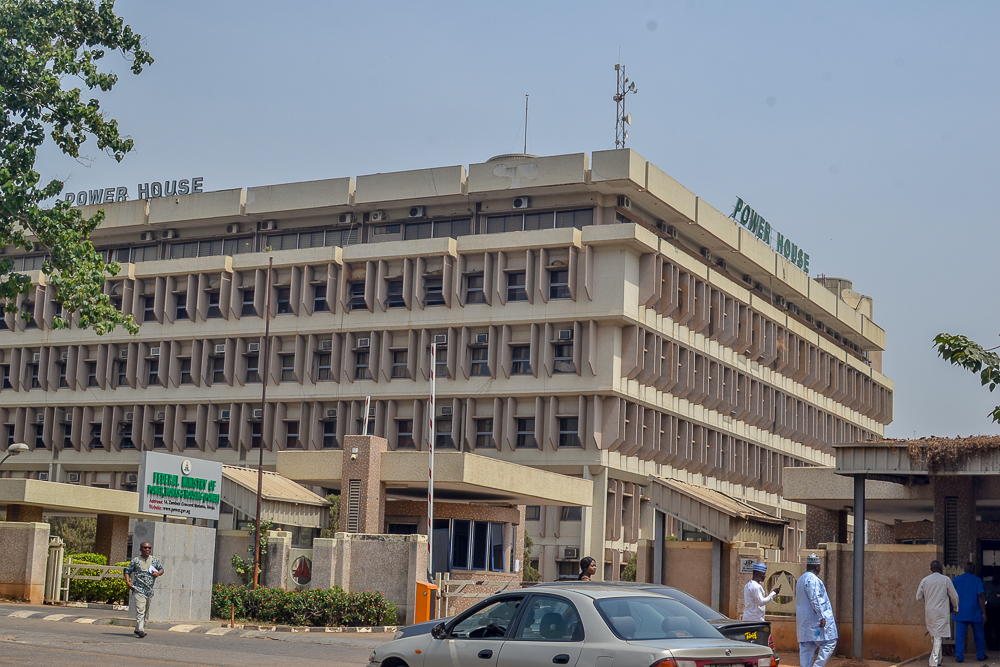
- Power House in Abuja. The headquarters of the Ministry of Power

Agency overview
- Jurisdiction: Federal Government of Nigeria
- Headquarters: Abuja
- Minister responsible: Joseph Olasunkanmi Tegbe
- Agency executives: Mahmuda Mamman, Permanent Secretary; See full list
- Website: www.power.gov.ng

Federal Ministry of Power is an arm of the Federal government of Nigeria with the responsibilities of providing social amenities such as Electricity across the country. The Ministry in discharging this mandate is guided by the provisions of the laws provided under National Electric Power Policy (NEPP) of 2001, the Electric Power Sector Reform (EPSR) Act of 2005, Rural Electrification Implementation Strategy Plan 2016 and the Roadmap for Power Sector Reform of August 2010.

== Administration ==
Muhammadu Buhari appoint Babatunde Fashola former governor of Lagos State as minister of Ministry of Power, Works and Housing, served from 2015 to 2019, in 2019 Saleh Mamman was appointed as a new minister. the Minister of Works And Housing. The President makes the announcement after an inauguration of his cabinet in capital territory Abuja. Later on The president decided to split the ministry into two He appointed Sale Mamman as minister of Power and Fashola to handle Works and Housing.

== Directors ==
Director	Department/Unit
Ojo Emmanuel O.	Energy Resources Development
Mustapha Babaumara	Distribution System
Nosike Emmanuel N.	Transmission System
Ali-Dapshima Abubakar	Renewable and Rural Power Access
Bala Sanusi Dutsinma	Finance and Accounts
Victoria Oluwatoyin Adeosun	Human Resources Management
Bosede Olaniyi	Planning, Research and Statistics
Abdulrasheed Lawal	Procurement
Titilayo A. Agbeyo	Reforms Coordination
Ochanya Ofoma-Ariejo	General Services
S S Liman	Legal Services
Olatoye Vaughan	Internal Audit
Dibiaezue Eke Florence	Information and Press
Source	

== Agency ==
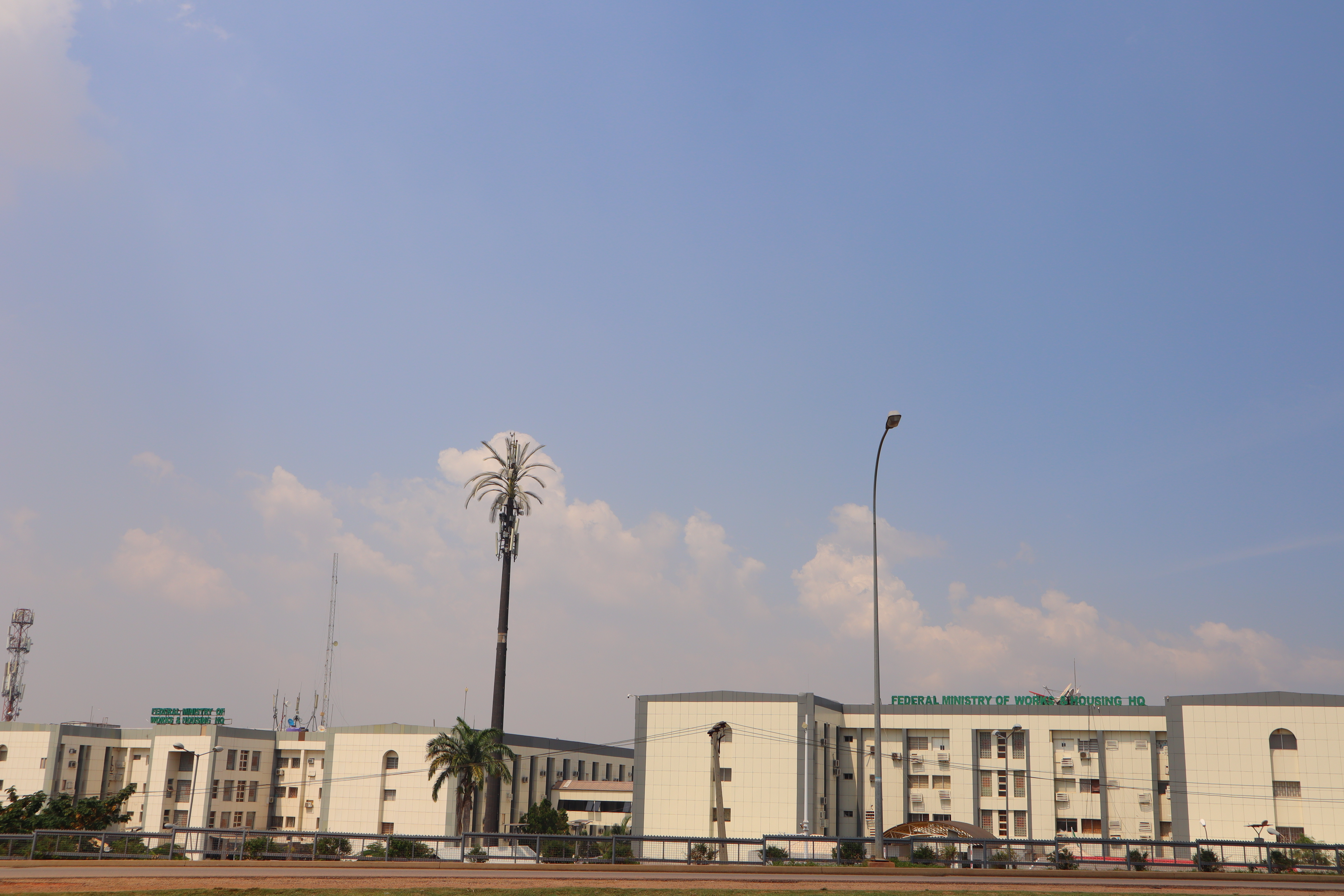
Federal Ministry of Works and Housing

The Ministry executes its mandatory work through the following Seven (7) Agencies:

- Nigerian Electricity Regulatory Commission (NERC)
- Transmission Company of Nigeria (TCN)
- Nigerian Independent System Operator (NISO)
- Nigerian Electricity Management Services Agency (NEMSA)
- Rural Electrification Agency (REA)
- Nigerian Electricity Liability Management Company (NELMCO)
- National Power Training Institute (NAPTIN)
- Nigerian Bulk Electricity Trading PLC (NBET) http://www.power.gov.ng|Official Website for Ministry of Power, Works and Housing
