= Femi Hamzat =

Nigerian politician and engineer (born 1964)

His Excellency Femi Hamzat
- Femi Hamzat at the Lagos Hackathon 2020

Deputy Governor of Lagos State
- Incumbent
- Assumed office 29 May 2019
- Governor: Babajide Sanwo-Olu
- Preceded by: Oluranti Adebule

Personal details
- Born: Kadri Obafemi Hamzat; 19 September 1964 (age 62) Lagos, Nigeria
- Party: All Progressive Congress
- Parents: Mufutau Olatunji Hamzat; Kehinde Hamzat
- Occupation: Politician; engineer

Kadri Obafemi Hamzat (born 19 September 1964) is a Nigerian politician who has served as deputy governor of Lagos State since 2019.

Hamzat was born in Lagos into the family of Late Oba Mufutau Olatunji Hamzat and Late Alhaja Kehinde Hamzat from Iga Egbe, Lagos State. His father, Late Oba Mufutau Olatunji Hamzat served as a member of the Lagos State House of Assembly and as a Commissioner for Transportation in the state (1979–1983) before becoming the Vice-chairman (South West) of then Alliance for Democracy (AD). He became the Lagos West Senatorial District leader of the Action Congress and a crowned king through his maternal royal lineage.

On 21 May 2026, Hamzat became the ruling All Progressives Congress (APC) candidate in the 2027 Lagos State gubernatorial election.

== Background ==
Hamzat was born on 19 September 1964 in Lagos, Nigeria, into the family of Late. Oba Mufutau Olatunji Hamzat and Late. Alhaja Kehinde Hamzat who is from Iga Egbe, Lagos state. His father, Late. Oba Mufutau Olatunji Hamzat served as a member of the Lagos State House of Assembly and as a Commissioner for Transportation in the state (1979–1983) before becoming the Vice-chairman (South West) of then Alliance for Democracy (AD). Olatunji Hamzat become the Lagos West Senatorial District leader of the Action Congress and a crowned king through his maternal royal lineage.

He had his primary education at Odu-Abore Memorial Primary School, Mushin, Lagos State, Nigeria and his secondary education at Olivet Baptist High School, Oyo state, in the Southwest region of Nigeria. He graduated from the University of Ibadan in 1986 with a degree in Agricultural Engineering in 1986 and a master's in Agricultural Engineering in 1988. In 1992, he had his PhD in Process Systems Engineering at Cranfield University, England.

== Career ==
He worked at RTP Consulting Services, Columbia University, Merrill Lynch Inc, Morgan Stanley and Oando Plc. In Oando Plc, he served as the Chief Information Officer and Group Head IT Strategist.

== Early political career ==
In August 2005, Dr. Hamzat was appointed Commissioner for Science and Technology during the tenure of Asiwaju Bola Ahmed Tinubu. He retained his position when Governor Babatunde Fashola assumed office in 2007.

It was during his tenure as Commissioner for Science and Technology that Dr. Hamzat enforced the application of modern technology in the state's ministries, thus changing the face of data and record keeping in Lagos and at the same time eliminating the trend of state ghost workers. The office had gone without a commissioner during Fashola's first four years (post-Rauf Aregbesola's appointment), with only a Special Adviser.

In execution of his mandate, Dr. Hamzat's ministry completed several key projects for Lagos State in the mega-city era.

== Later roles and Deputy Governor election ==
Hamzat was appointed as Special Adviser on Works to the Honourable Minister for Works, Power and Housing, Mr. Babatunde Fashola in 2015. In September 2018, he resigned that role to contest in the Lagos state gubernatorial elections.

After a long-fought primary, Dr. Hamzat emerged as the running mate for Babajide Sanwo-Olu for whom he had stepped down during the primaries. Sanwo-Olu would eventually become the party's nominee, and later Governor-Elect. Both men ran together a campaign that went to different parts of the state. On 10 March 2019, after the election, Dr. Hamzat was declared Deputy Governor-Elect of Lagos State by the Independent National Electoral Commission and presented a Certificate of Return.

== Awards ==
Dr. Hamzat won the fifth Lagos State Man of the Year Award in September 2013.

== See also ==
- List of Yoruba people
