= Akinwunmi Ambode =

Nigerian politician and accountant (born 1963)

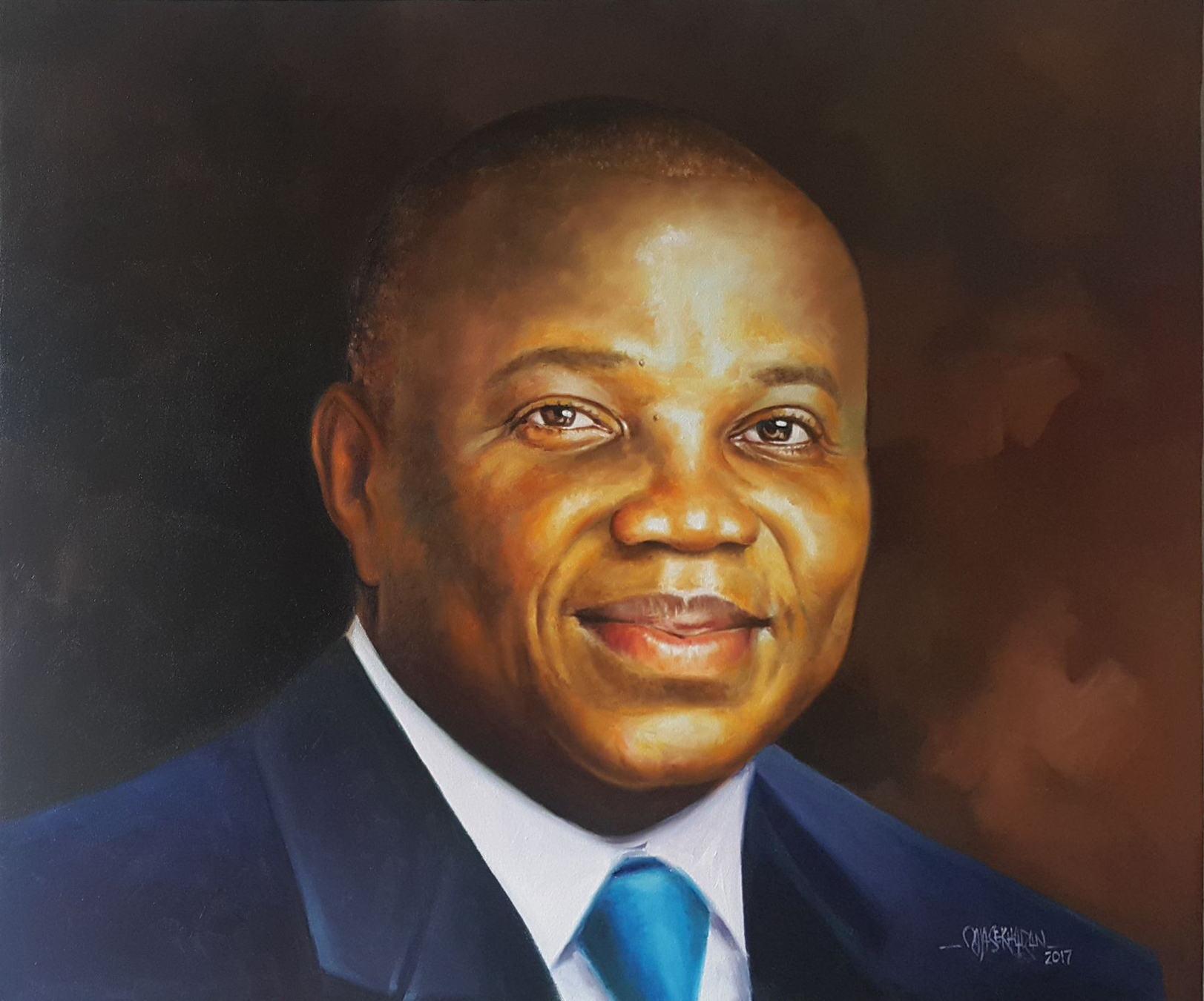
- An Oil Painting of Akinwunmi Ambode

14th Governor of Lagos State
- In office 29 May 2015 – 29 May 2019
- Deputy: Oluranti Adebule
- Preceded by: Babatunde Fashola
- Succeeded by: Babajide Sanwo-Olu

Personal details
- Born: Akinwunmi Dapo Ambode; 14 June 1963 (age 63) Epe, Lagos State, Nigeria
- Party: All Progressives Congress
- Spouse: Bolanle Odukomaiya (m. 1991)
- Children: 2
- Education: Federal Government College, Warri; University of Lagos; Wharton Business School; Cranfield School of Management; Institute of Management Development; INSEAD; Harvard Kennedy School of Government
- Occupation: Politician; accountant

Akinwunmi Ambode (born 14 June 1963) is a Nigerian politician who served as governor of Lagos State from 2015 to 2019. He was a civil servant for 27 years and a financial consultant before running for public office.

Ambode ran for office of the Governor of Lagos State in April 2015 as a member of the All Progressives Congress, the state's ruling party. He won the election, defeating second-place Jimi Agbaje of the Peoples Democratic Party by just 150,000 votes. He began his tenure on 29 May 2015, succeeding Babatunde Fashola. In October 2018, Ambode lost the APC gubernatorial primary election to Babajide Sanwo-Olu, denying him the opportunity to run for a second term. He eventually supported Sanwo-Olu's campaign that brought about a smooth transition in the state.

== Early life ==
Akinwunmi Ambode was born on 14 June 1963 in Epe General Hospital, into the family of Festus Akinwale Ambode and Christianah Oluleye Ambode. Akinwunmi Ambode is one of ten children of his father Festus Ambode.

== Education ==
Akinwunmi Ambode attended St. Jude's Primary School, Ebute Metta, Lagos State, from 1969 to 1974, where he sat for the National Common Entrance Examinations.

From 1974 to 1981, Ambode, attended Federal Government College, Warri, Delta State. From 1981 to 1984, he attended University of Lagos where he studied Accounting, graduating at the age of 21.

He also has a master's degree in accounting from the University of Lagos, and he qualified as a chartered accountant.

Ambode was awarded the Fulbright Program scholarship for the Hubert Humphries Fellowship Programme in Boston, Massachusetts. He also attended the Wharton School of the University of Pennsylvania for Advanced Management Programme. Other institutions he attended for courses and programmes include Cranfield School of Management, Cranfield, England, the Institute of Management Development, Lausanne, Switzerland, INSEAD, Singapore. Moreover, he attended the John F. Kennedy School of Government at Harvard University, Cambridge, USA.

== Civil service career ==
From 1988 to 1991, Akinwunmi Ambode was the Assistant Treasurer, Badagry local government, Lagos State, Nigeria. In 1991, he was posted to Somolu Local Government, Lagos State, as an auditor. He has also held the position of Council Treasurer in Shomolu Local Government in later years.

He also previously served as Council Treasurer at Alimosho Local Government, Lagos State. In 2001, he became acting Auditor General for Local Government, Lagos State, Nigeria. This position was confirmed by the State House of Assembly. In January 2005, Ambode was appointed the permanent secretary of the Lagos State Ministry of Finance.

From 2006- 2012, Ambode was the accountant general for Lagos State, in charge of all the financial activities of the state and directly responsible for over 1400 accountants in the state service. Under his watch, the State Treasury Office (STO) revolutionized the way Lagos State finances were raised, budgeted, managed and planned. In his six years as the Lagos State accountant general, the state's financial performance improved visibly with the budget performing at an average of 85% annually.

== Consulting career ==
After 27 years in the civil service, Ambode voluntarily retired in August 2012. He founded Brandsmiths Consulting Limited to provide Public Finance and Management Consulting services to government at all levels, its parastatals and agencies.

== Memberships ==
Ambode is an active member of the Federal Government College Warri, Old Students Association (FEGOCOWOSA) and is credited with revitalizing the Lagos branch of the Association. Ambode was a two-time Chairman of the Lagos State Branch, and, until recently, was the National President of the Association, a position he held for three years. In those three years, he executed key projects in the school in conjunction with the alumni network to improve the educational and living standards of the students.

== Non-profit organisation ==
In 2013, he founded the non-profit La Roche Leadership Foundation. Its recent goal is to install Nigerian and Lagos State flags in all government owned schools in Lagos State.

== Personal life ==
In 1991, Ambode married Bolanle Patience Odukomaiya. They have twins, a boy and a girl. Ambode is a Christian.

== See also ==
- Lagos State Executive Council
- List of Yoruba people
- List of governors of Lagos State
