= Musiliu Obanikoro =

Nigerian politician

Senator for Lagos Central
- In office 3 June 2003 – 5 June 2007 Serving with Adeleke Mamora and Tokunbo Afikuyomi
- Preceded by: Tokunbo Afikuyomi
- Succeeded by: Munirudeen Muse

Minister of State for Defence
- In office 2014 – October 2014

Personal details
- Born: Musiliu Babatunde Obanikoro Lagos
- Party: All Progressive Congress (Nigeria) (APC) Peoples Democratic Party (PDP) until November 2017
- Education: Texas Southern University
- Profession: Politician

Musiliu Babatunde Obanikoro (popularly known as Koro) is a Nigerian politician. He served as Senator for Lagos Central from 2003 to 2007, and was later appointed High Commissioner to Ghana. He briefly served as Minister of State for Defence in 2014.

== Background ==
Musiliu Olatunde Obanikoro was born in Lagos. He attended Saint Patrick Catholic School (Idumagbo, Lagos) and Ahmadiyya College (Anwar-ul/Islam College; Agege). While in the United States, he attended Texas Southern University where he earned his B.Sc degree in Public Affairs and Master's Degree in Public Administration (M.P.A).

He served as an intern with Houston adult Probation Department, Houston, Texas. He worked as a social worker and later as the Head of the adolescent unit with Little Flower Children Service (an agency affiliated with New York City Department of Social Service).

== Early political career ==
He returned to Nigeria in 1989 and started his political career immediately. He was appointed as Caretaker Committee Chairman of Surulere Local Government (National Republican Convention); he was elected as the State Deputy Chairman (NRC); appointed by Governor Otedola's administration as Director, LASBULK (Lagos State Bulk Purchasing Corporation); and member, Lagos State Football Association. He has served as Delegate to Local Government Congress, State Congress, and National Convention. He has also served as Elected State Secretary, Justice Forum. He was also the chairman, Lagos Island Local Government. He was a national Executive member, Grassroots Democratic Movement (GDM) under the military government of General Sani Abacha.

He was appointed State Commissioner for Home Affairs and Culture in 1999 and served for four years before he was elected Senator of the Federal republic of Nigeria.

== Senate career ==
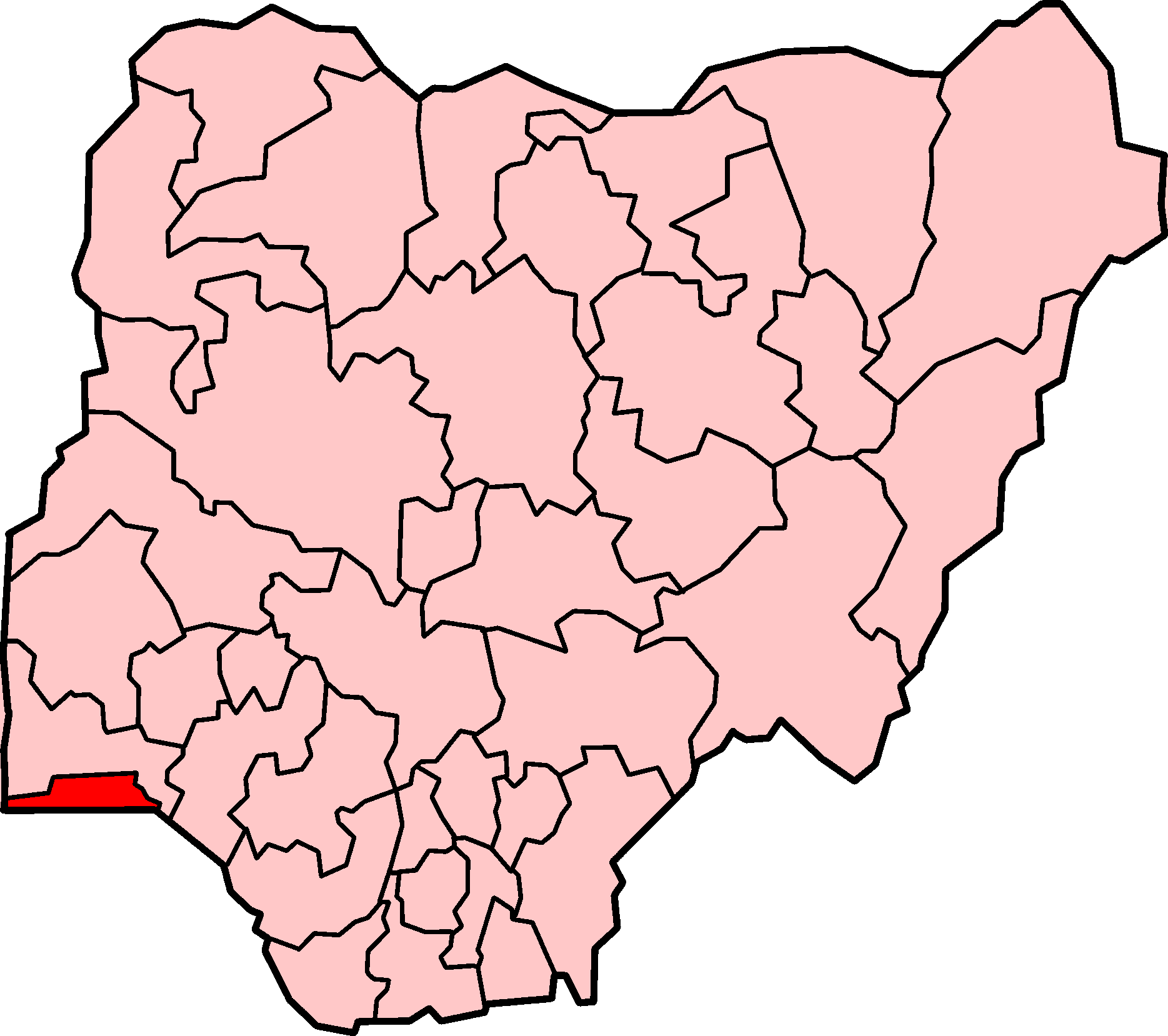
Lagos State, Nigeria

Musiliu Obanikoro was elected senator for Lagos Central in April 2003, running for the Alliance for Democracy (AD). During the election, each side accused the other of hijacking ballot boxes. He later defected to the People's Democratic Party (PDP).

He was appointed by President Olusegun Obasanjo as a member of the 2004 Amirul-Hajj Committee. In February 2005, Obanikoro was among senators who urged the African Union chairman, President Olusegun Obasanjo, to use military force if necessary to restore democracy in Togo.

As Senator, Musiliu Obanikoro proposed motions on the surge and overflow of the Atlantic Ocean along the Bar beach shoreline, to stop the incessant increments in pump prices of petroleum products, to protect Lagos State from the menace of flood, to probe into the condition of the velodrome at the National Stadium (Abuja), and for the resolution of the clash between men of the Nigerian Police Force and men of the Nigerian Army in Lagos State. He sponsored several bills, calling for acts to regulate and control public Buildings, to regulate and control the dredging and excavating of land, to provide for the re-certification of Fuel Pumps, to prevent Casualisation in public and private Establishment, and to amend the Federal Capital Territory Act.

During the OPP (Obanikoro Priority Projects), hundreds of items were given out to his constituents, including motor bikes, milling machines, popcorn machines, sewing machines, assorted farming tools, telephone lines and phones, etc.

In making education a priority, the Senator established the Senator Obanikoro Leadership and Education Project (SOLEP). Under this programme he supplied textbooks, notebooks, forms and scholarship funding.

He is currently in partnership with a US-based NGO (AWHPI) to set up a mammogram centre that will enable women to test for breast cancer for free in Lagos.

In July 2006, Funsho Williams, who was seeking to become PDP candidate for the Lagos State governorship election, was murdered. Police investigating the case arrested all gubernatorial aspirants of the party including Obanikoro. All were later released for non-involvement.

== Later career ==
In April 2007 Musiliu Obanikoro ran for governor of Lagos State on the PDP ticket, but lost the election to Babatunde Fashola of the Action Congress. The election was marred by violence. In one incident, Musiliu Obanikoro was said to have narrowly escaped death in an armed attack on his car in Ikeja. His nomination as PDP candidate was controversial. Hilda Williams, widow of the murdered Engineer Funsho Williams, had been declared winner of the Lagos PDP primaries, but the PDP National Executive Committee (NEC) led by Ahmadu Ali gave the ticket to Obanikoro. The disunited PDP under Bode George also lost the Lagos State Senate and all but one House of Representatives and 37 State House of Assembly seats to the AC.

In a newspaper interview in July 2007, Obanikoro called on the Federal Government to declare a state of emergency in Lagos State, claiming that infrastructures and values had completely collapsed.

President Umaru Yar'Adua appointed Musiliu Obanikoro as Nigerian High commissioner to Ghana in May 2008.

Divisions between factions in the Lagos State PDP which had surfaced before the 2007 elections continued until a series of meeting in October 2009, where the differences were resolved.

Following the 2015 news scandal involving illegal diversion of $2billion of funds meant to fight the Boko Haram insurgency, authorities of the Economic and Financial Crimes Commission (EFCC) arrested Obanikoro and slammed him with money laundering charges. He later described to authorities how he used his office to divert five million dollars (about N1.8 billion) from public funds meant for purchase of arms to top personalities and figures such as former Governor of Ekiti State in Nigeria, Ayodele Fayose.
