= Babajide Sanwo-Olu =

Nigerian politician (born 1965)

His Excellency Babajide Sanwo-Olu CON
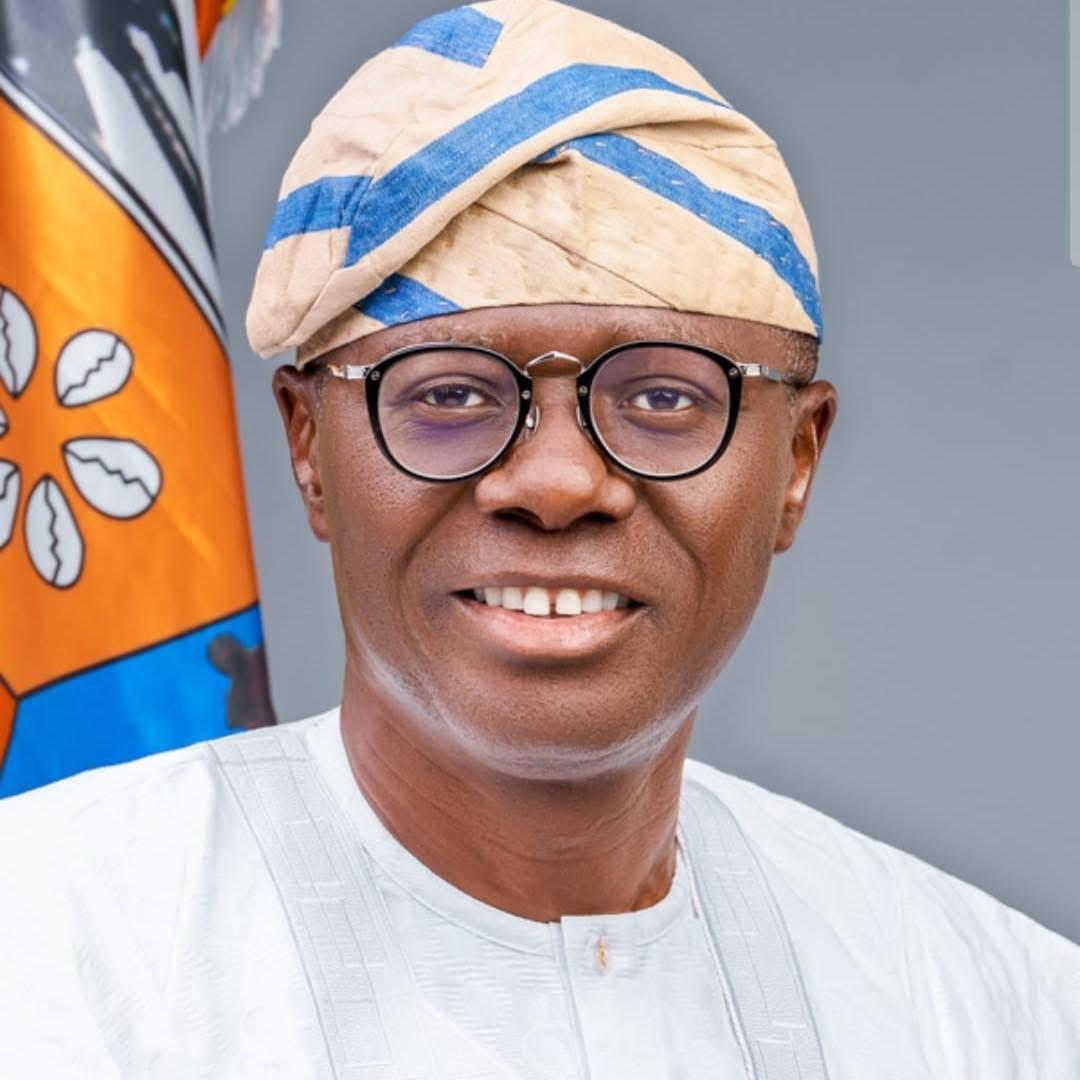
- Official portrait, 2023

15th Governor of Lagos State
- Incumbent
- Assumed office 29 May 2019
- Deputy: Obafemi Hamzat
- Preceded by: Akinwunmi Ambode

Personal details
- Born: Babajide Olusola Sanwo-Olu; 25 June 1965 (age 61) Lagos, Nigeria
- Party: All Progressives Congress
- Spouse: Ibijoke Carrena
- Children: 4
- Education: University of Lagos; London Business School; Lagos Business School; Institute of Management Development; John F. Kennedy School of Government
- Occupation: Politician; banker
- Website: Personal website; Official website

Babajide Olusola Sanwo-Olu CON (born 25 June 1965) is a Nigerian politician who has served as the governor of Lagos State since 2019.

Sanwo-Olu become governor under the platform of the All Progressives Congress after winning the APC gubernatorial primaries against then-incumbent governor, Akinwunmi Ambode who had fallen out of favour with his alleged political sponsor. He is a graduate of the University of Lagos, London Business School, Lagos Business School and the John F. Kennedy School of Government.

Before his gubernatorial ambition, he was the managing director and CEO of Lagos State Property Development Corporation (LSPDC).

== Education ==
Sanwo-Olu briefly attended Government Demonstration School, Gbaja Surulere before moving to Ijebu-Ife Grammar School, Ogun State to complete his secondary education. He has a BSc in Surveying and an MBA from the University of Lagos. He is an alumnus of the John F. Kennedy School of Government, the London Business School and the Lagos Business School.

He is an associate member of the Chartered Institute of Personnel Management (CIPM) and fellow of the Nigeria Institute of Training and Development (NITAD).

== Career ==
=== Banking ===
Sanwo-Olu was the treasurer at the former Lead Merchant Bank from 1994 to 1997, after which he moved to the United Bank for Africa as the head of foreign money market. He then proceeded to First Inland Bank, Plc (now First City Monument Bank) as a deputy general manager and divisional head. He later became the chairman of Baywatch Group Limited and First Class Group Limited.

=== Public service ===
Sanwo-Olu began his political career in 2003, when he was appointed a special adviser on corporate matters to the then deputy governor of Lagos State, Femi Pedro. He was later made the acting Commissioner for Economic Planning and Budget until 2007, when he was appointed as the Commissioner for Commerce and Industry by Governor Bola Tinubu. After the General Elections of 2007, Sanwo-Olu was appointed Commissioner for Establishments, Training and Pensions by Governor Babatunde Fashola. Sanwo-Olu was made Managing Director/CEO of the Lagos State Development and Property Corporation (LSDPC) by Governor Akinwunmi Ambode in 2016.

Some of his notable public sector achievements include the supervision of the Bureau of Public Enterprises (BPE) privatisation projects. He set up and was the pioneer board chairman of Lagos Security Trust Fund. The LAGBUS System and the Control & Command Centre in Alausa Ikeja were subsequently established under his directives.

=== Politics ===
On 16 September 2018, Sanwo-Olu formally declared his intention to run for the office of the governor of Lagos State under the platform of the All Progressives Congress (APC) making him a major contender to the incumbent governor Akinwunmi Ambode.

His declaration attracted endorsements from major stakeholders in Lagos State politics, including the famous in-house political group, Lagos chapter of the All Progressives Congress, the Governor's Advisory Council and members of the Lagos State House of Assembly. This would lead to the withdrawal of Obafemi Hamzat, who had also declared interest to contest the position.

Sanwo-Olu won the Lagos gubernatorial primaries of the All Progressives Congress on 2 October 2018. At the APC flag-off campaign rally held on 8 January 2019, Governor Akinwunmi Ambode, and several other political parties pledged their support for the candidacy of Sanwo-Olu. In a landslide victory over his main opponent, Jimi Agbaje, Sanwo-Olu was elected to the office of governor of Lagos State at the 2019 Lagos State gubernatorial election held on 9 March 2019. He was sworn in as the 15th governor of Lagos State at the Tafawa Balewa Square (TBS) Lagos Island on Wednesday 29 May 2019.

He has been working on different development activities, one of which is massive road construction in major areas across the state. In 2020, Sanwo-Olu asked that the statue of Fela Kuti that was erected by Akinwunmi Ambode be removed from Allen Avenue in Ikeja, to ease the situation of traffic in that area. He commissioned the Oshodi - Abule-Egba BRT Lane amongst other projects in 2020.

He was reelected governor under the umbrella of the All Progressives Congress (APC) during the 2023 Lagos State gubernatorial election held on 18 March defeating Gbadebo Rhodes-Vivour of the Labour Party (LP) who came first runner up and AbdulAzeez Olajide ‘Jandor’ Adediran of the Peoples Democratic Party (PDP) who came second runner up in a deeply violent and hate speech charged election that fuelled ethnic tensions.

The re-election of Sanwo-Olu was contested by both Gbadebo Rhodes-Vivour of the Labour Party (LP) and Olajide Adediran of the Peoples Democratic Party (PDP). They alleged that Sanwo-Olu's deputy, Femi Hamzat was unqualified to contest the election because, according to them, he had renounced his Nigerian citizenship, and that Sanwo-Olu presented a forged high school certificate.

On Monday, 25 September 2023, the Lagos State Governorship Election Petition Tribunal threw out both Jandor's and Rhodes-Vivour's petitions and affirmed Sanwo-Olu and Hamzat as duly elected governor and deputy governor of Lagos State.

== Awards ==
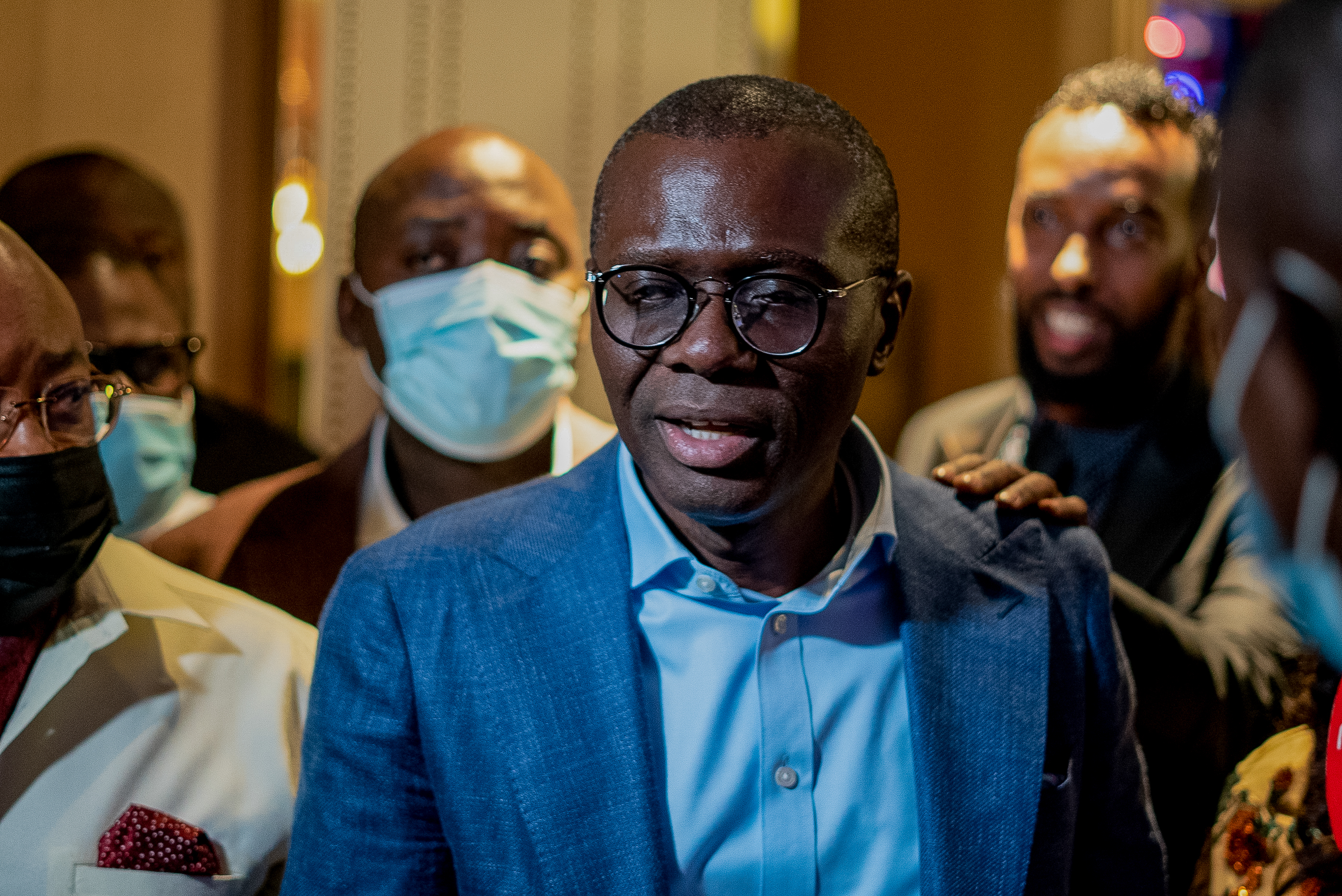
Gov. Sanwaolu at the 2021 AMA Award

Sanwo-Olu has obtained a variety of awards in his career, some of which include:

- Platinum award from the Lagos State Public Service Club.
- 2009 Best in Human Capital Development award from the Industrial Training Fund (ITF).
- Merit award from the Association of National Accountants of Nigeria.
- Merit award from the Chartered Institute of Personnel Management in Nigeria (CIPMN).
- Merit Award from the Association of Professional Women Engineers of Nigeria (APWEN).
- LSDPC Impactful Leadership and Recognition Award.
- Media Nite-Out Award for Best Governor of the Year (2020).
- Special Guest of Honour awarded by Ikoyi Club 1938 Table Tennis (2025).

== Personal life ==
Sanwo-Olu is married to Ibijoke Sanwo-Olu and he is Christian.

== See also ==
- List of Yoruba people
- List of governors of Lagos State

Party political offices
Preceded by Akinwunmi Ambode	APC nominee for Governor of Lagos State; 2019, 2023	Most recent
Political offices
Preceded by Akinwunmi Ambode	Governor of Lagos State; 2019–present	Incumbent
