= Babatunde Fashola =

Nigerian politician and lawyer (born 1963)

His Excellency Babatunde Fashola CON SAN
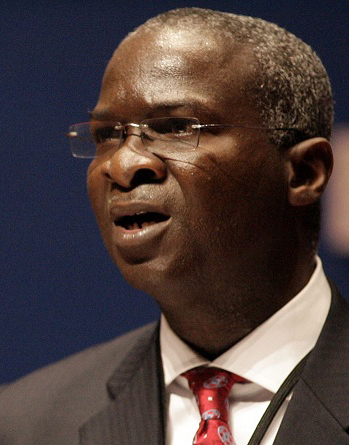

Minister of Works and Housing
- In office 21 August 2019 – 29 May 2023
- President: Muhammadu Buhari
- Minister of State: Abubakar Aliyu (2019–2021); Mu'azu Sambo (2021–2022); Umar Ibrahim El-Yakub (2022–2023)
- Preceded by: Himself (as Minister of Power, Works and Housing)
- Succeeded by: Dave Umahi (as Minister of Works); Ahmed Musa Dangiwa (as Minister of Housing)

Minister of Power, Works and Housing
- In office 11 November 2015 – 28 May 2019
- President: Muhammadu Buhari
- Minister of State: Mustapha Baba Shehuri; Suleiman Hassan Zarma
- Preceded by: Osita Nebo (as Minister of Power); Mike Onolememen (as Minister of Works); Akon Eyakenyi (as Minister of Housing)
- Succeeded by: Saleh Mamman (as Minister of Power); Himself (as Minister of Works and Housing)

13th Governor of Lagos State
- In office 29 May 2007 – 29 May 2015
- Deputy: Sarah Adebisi Sosan (2007–2011); Adejoke Orelope-Adefulire (2011–2015)
- Preceded by: Bola Tinubu
- Succeeded by: Akinwunmi Ambode

Personal details
- Born: Babatunde Raji Fashola; 28 June 1963 (age 63) Lagos, Nigeria
- Party: All Progressives Congress (2013–present)
- Other political affiliations: Action Congress of Nigeria (before 2013)
- Spouse: Abimbola Fashola
- Children: 2
- Occupation: Politician; lawyer

Babatunde Raji Fashola CON SAN (Yoruba: Bàbátúndé Rájí Fáṣọlá; born 28 June 1963) is a Nigerian lawyer and politician who served as the federal minister of Works and Housing of Nigeria from 2019 to 2023. He was minister of Power, Works and Housing from 2015 to 2019, and served two terms as governor of Lagos State from 2007 to 2015.

== Early life ==
Fashola was born on 28 June 1963, in Lagos at Island Maternity Hospital to Ademola Fashola, a former journalist with the Daily Times of Nigeria, and Olufunke Agunbiade, a nurse. He has 12 siblings.

== Legal career ==
=== Supreme Court ===
He was called to the Nigerian Bar as a solicitor and advocate of the Supreme Court of Nigeria in November 1988 after completing the professional training programme at the Nigerian Law School, Lagos which he undertook between 1987 and 1988.

=== Honours ===
Fashola, a Notary Public of the Supreme Court of Nigeria, has received awards and certificates of merit including the Distinguished Alumnus Award conferred on him by the University of Benin Alumni Association. He is also a recipient of Lagos State public service club Platinum Award for contribution towards development, and has received the Alliance for Democracy "Igbogbo Bayeku Local Government Award" in recognition of activities towards the success of the party.

Fashola is also a Patron of the Law Students Association of the University of Benin. He is the second law graduate from the University of Benin and the first member of the Nigerian Law School graduating class of 1988 to be conferred with the professional rank of Senior Advocate of Nigeria. Fashola is the first ever Chief of Staff to be so honoured. Babatunde Fashola is also a member of the Nigerian Bar Association, the International Bar Association and an Associate of the Chartered Institute of Taxation of Nigeria.

In October 2022, a Nigerian national honour of Commander of the Order of the Niger (CON) was conferred on him by President Muhammadu Buhari.

=== Arbitration ===
In 2008, Fashola was inducted as a Fellow of the Nigerian Institute of Chartered Arbitrators (NICArb).

== Controversies and corruption allegations ==
After leaving office in 2015, Fashola was confronted by the Economic and Financial Crimes Commission (EFCC) of Nigeria to answer questions regarding allegations of misuse of finances. These included instances of awarding inflated contracts which culminated in his administration leaving large debts of over N400bn ($2.1bn) to his successor.

In August 2023, Fashola reported to the Nigerian Police and requested for the arrest of Chike Ibezim. Ibezim was tracked by phone for false publication and defamation of character against Fashola. Ibezim's brother, Nnamdi Ibezim, is also involved through the news platform Reportera. Ibezim's platform published news that claimed Fashola was caught drafting a judgement in favour of his party in Nigeria's 2023 presidential election, which would be brought to court. Chike Ibezim denied his role in the publication, but there was no evidence to support his claim, and the article was published from his phone. He was held in detention by the Nigerian Police for 26 days for further investigation, and was then put on trial. Chike's continuous detention has led to concerns.

On 9 September 2023 the Nigerian Federal Ministry of Works, headed by Fashola, was accused of inflating a road contract from 9.8 billion naira ($12.7 million) to 54.3 billion naira ($70.6 million). The road contract in question was the construction and rehabilitation of the 41-kilometer Ijebu-Igbo-Ita-Ibadan Road which had been halted for over five years after its award of contract.

== Political appointments ==
Fashola was chief of staff to his predecessor, Asiwaju Bola Ahmed Tinubu. Fashola, had during his tenure as Chief of Staff, also served as the Commissioner to the Governor's office. He was the first person to hold both offices simultaneously.

Babatunde Fashola also served in Lagos state in various capacities, including:

- Secretary of the Lands Sub-Committee of the Transitional Work Groups (1999)
- Member of the panel of Enquiry into allocation of houses on the Mobolaji Johnson Housing Scheme at Lekki (2000)
- Member of the State Tenders Board (2002–2006)
- Member of the Lagos State Executive Council (2002–2006)
- Member of the State Security Council (2002–2006)
- Member of the State Treasury Board (2002–2006)
- Chairman Ad-Hoc Committee on the Review of Asset distribution among Local Government
- Minister of Power, Works and Housing (2015–2019)
- Minister of Works and Housing (2019–present)

=== Governor of Lagos state ===
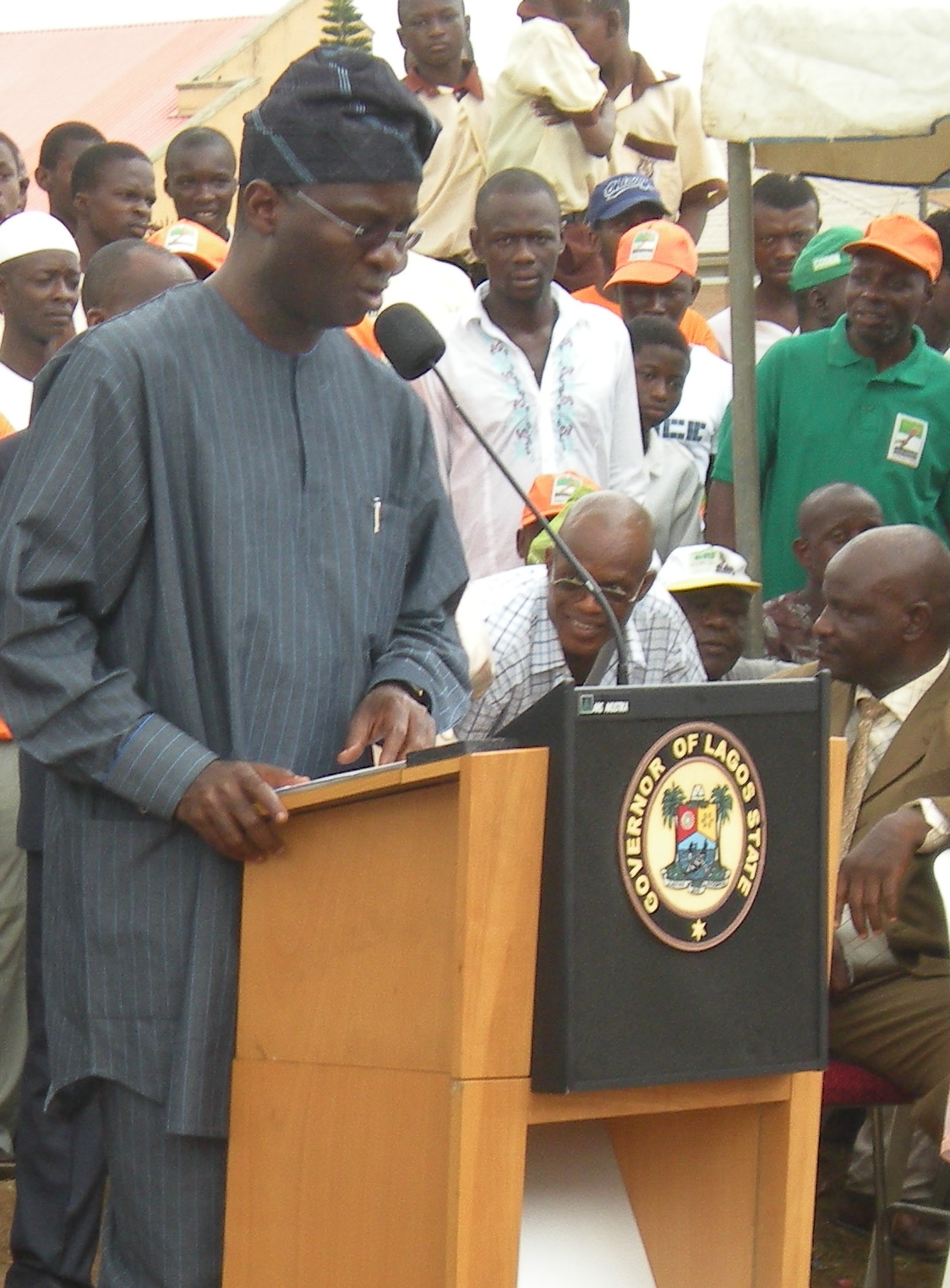
Fashola delivering a speech in June 2010

As the candidate of the Action Congress party (now the All Progressives Congress party) Fashola succeeded Tinubu as governor of Lagos State on 14 April 2007. Fashola was re-elected on 26 April 2011.

==== Lagos infrastructural regeneration ====
Fashola focused on the rehabilitation of Lagos' infrastructures. These infrastructures had been neglected for years after Abuja was declared the new capital of Nigeria in 1991. The modernisation of Lagos, which Tinubu had begun, accelerated under Fashola's governorship. Both the private and public sectors were involved in the realisation of the project.

===== Bus Rapid Transit =====
Fashola introduced air-conditioned city buses, the BRT buses, for which dedicated lanes were constructed.

===== Suburban railway =====
Fashola initiated the construction of the Lagos Light Rail, the commuter rail of Lagos, the first two lines of which are scheduled for completion in the last quarter of 2022 (as of January 2022). The "Blue Line" of the suburban railway at the National Theatre

===== Highways =====
On assuming office, Fashola embarked on a major overhaul of the city's main highways. At the same time, major reconstruction works took place almost everywhere in Lagos. The result was that the Lagos metropolis took on a new look in the first four years of his tenure. Most major roads were redesigned and re-painted. New roads were built with flyover bridges. Ultra-modern footbridges were built to replace the old, dilapidated bridges.

==== Education ====
The Fashola government ensured reinstatement and establishment of well-equipped new classrooms, distribution of free textbooks, provision of well-equipped workrooms and libraries, provision of buses for teachers and students to facilitate transportation, reinstatement of uniformed voluntary administrators in public schools in the state, introduction of a salary scale for teachers in public schools in the state, development of the Adopt a School Initiative and others. The schools that have been repaired include: Ikotun Senior High School, Alimosho Girls High School, Agege Okemagba Junior High School, Mojoda Amuwo Senior Grammar School and Tomia Community Secondary School, Alagbado.

==== Rural projects ====
Over 110 rural development projects were completed under the Rural Water Supply and Sanitation Structure. At the end of 2009, 104 communities were metered for the provision of a modified Type A water system from the Intervention Fund. Some other achievements in the rural sector include: Construction of modern abattoirs in Ologe, Oko-Oba and Lairage. Construction of access roads to link villages at places was made. The state government has completed 165 rural electrification projects under its rural interference programme.

==== Reclamation of land ====
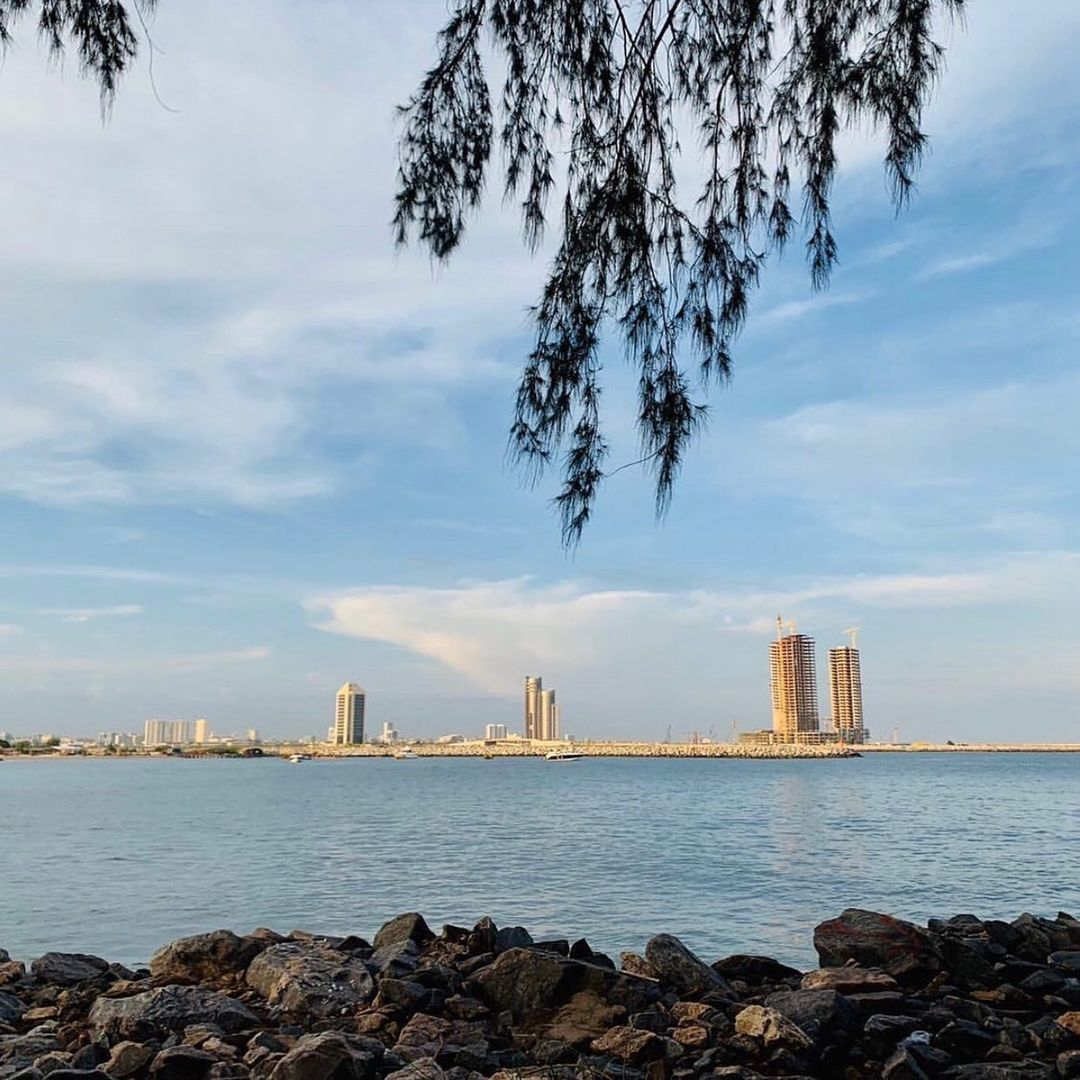
Eko Atlantic skyline

Land reclamation was made under Fashola. This includes Banana Island and Eko Atlantic City, both of which have been filled. Eko Atlantic City is expected to house millions of Lagosians in the future and, unlike the rest of the city, is equipped with sewers, its own electricity supply and other features of a modern city.

==== City beautification ====
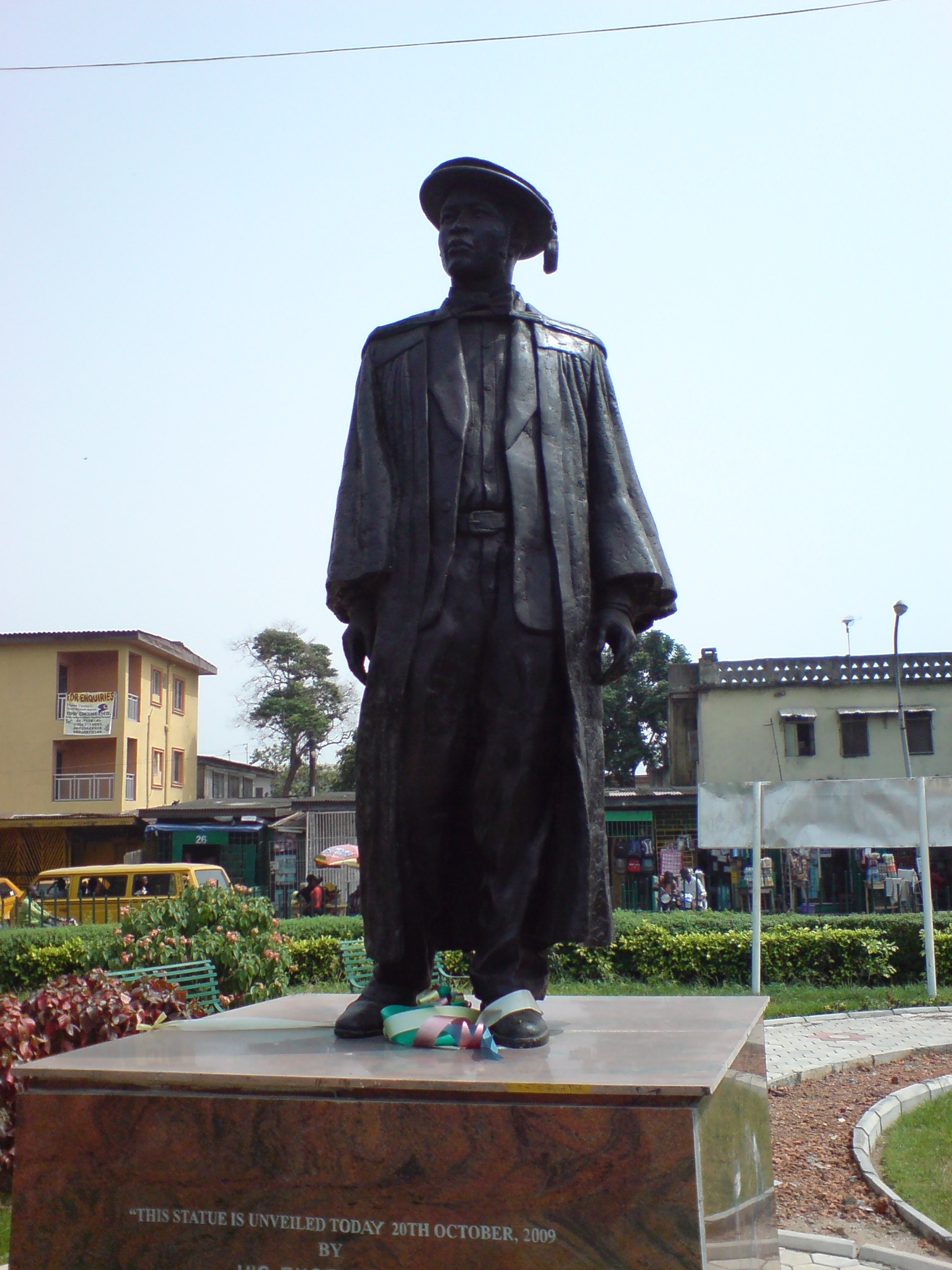
Statue of Ayodele Awojobi

In October 2009, Fashola inaugurated a garden in honour of the late Professor Ayodele Awojobi at Onike Roundabout, Yaba, Lagos, in the middle of which a statue of the famous academic was placed. Artists like Oladejo Victor Akinlonu were enlisted for beautification projects. The Eyo Masquerade and the bust of Sir Alexander Molade Okoya Thomas were commissioned by the governor.

==== Public security ====
The Lagos State Security Trust Fund was established with the aim of effectively and sustainably funding the security needs of the state. The Fashola government also claimed to have converted various hideouts and areas that served as bases for fraudsters and armed robbers into beautification projects.

June 2007, Babatunde Fashola appointed former Inspector General of Police Musiliu Smith head of the Lagos State Security council, a body charged with taking a holistic look at the anatomy of crime in the state.

==== Haiti earthquake fundraising ====
Fashola launched an appeal to raise up to one million US dollars for the Haiti Earthquake in 2010. The funds raised were used to assist the victims.

==== Water safety ====
In May 2014, Fashola announced the compulsory use of life jackets on Lagos waterways. In a 2012 accident, ten children from Ijora Awori, Lagos State, drowned while they were being ferried to school, because they weren't wearing life jackets.

==== Eateries tax ====
A controversial proposal to impose a consumption tax on eateries was enforced. The matter was taken to court, but the ruling was announced in the government's favor.

==== Waste investigation ====
In late January 2010, the Lagos State House of Assembly launched an investigation into possible waste of taxpayers' money by Fashola, mainly in connection with the ongoing Eko Atlantic City project. The allegations range from importation of palm trees from Niger for horticulture projects to improper use of contract money involving one of the Lagos State contractors. The group conducting the investigation was known as True Face of Lagos. The final reports were to be submitted on 15 February 2010. During his tenure, True Face of Lagos was later disbanded. Attempts were made to restart the investigation through a petition, but they were repeatedly rejected by the courts.

==== The fight against Ebola ====
Three months after Ebola had first spread in the country, Patrick Sawyer, the infected US-Liberian citizen and ECOWAS official, brought in the virus through Lagos airport. Babatunde Raji Fashola was in office in September 2014 when Nigeria was officially declared free of Ebola.

He is said to have taken control of tracking down and isolating about 1,000 people who were feared to have been infected since Sawyer's arrival. The Lagos governor cut short a pilgrimage to Mecca, flew home and then set up an Ebola Emergency Operations Centre to take on monitoring those who might be infected. A team of 2,000 officials was trained and knocked on 26,000 doors. At one point, the governor was briefed by disease control experts up to ten times a day. He made a point of visiting the country's Ebola treatment centre to impress upon the Nigerian public that they should not panic unnecessarily.

=== Ministerial position ===
Fashola was appointed Minister of Power, Works and Housing by President Muhammadu Buhari on 11 November 2015; he was appointed Minister of Works and Housing on 21 August 2019.

==== Completion of the "Second Niger Bridge" ====
The Second Niger Bridge at Onitsha, which had been the subject of political debate since the 1980s was pushed forward under Fashola and was completed in 2023.

==== Completion of the Lagos-Ibadan Expressway ====
The renovation of the former "pothole test track" from the metropolis of Lagos to Nigeria's third largest city, Ibadan, has not yet been completed as of April 2026.

==== Other achievements ====
Fashola is credited with work on:

- The completed motorway between Lagos and Oworonshoki
- The repair of the Lagos Third Mainland Bridge
- The completion of the motorway between the capital, Abuja, and Nigeria's second largest city, Kano

Eight hundred road contracts have been signed, he said. Currently, 13,000 km of roads are being rehabilitated and 37 bridges are being built.

In the process, he says its budget has been slashed from 260 billion naira in 2015 ($1.3 billion in 2015) to 234 billion naira in 2021 ($561.6 million in 2021). According to Fashola, "We are now doing a lot more with less resources."

== Evaluation ==
Across party lines, Fashola is mostly valued for his expertise. However, in later years, he would become more absent from the public scene, skipping voting which was held at the Lagos polling unit near where he resided in both the 2021 and 2025 Lagos LG elections.

== Personal life ==
Fashola is married to Abimbola Fashola. They have two children.

== Legacy ==
The railway station in the Agege area of Lagos is named after Babatunde Fashola.

== See also ==
- Timeline of Lagos, 2000s–present
- List of governors of Lagos State
- List of Yoruba people
