= Lagos State Civil Service =

Civil Service overview
- Formed: 1967
- Jurisdiction: Government of Lagos State
- Headquarters: State Government Secretariat, Alausa, Lagos State, Nigeria
- Civil Service executive: Hakeem Muri-Okunola, Head of service
- Website: https://civilservice.lagosstate.gov.ng/

The Lagos State Civil Service consists of employees in Lagos State government agencies other than the military. Most employees under the service are career civil servants in the Lagos state ministries, progressing based on qualifications and seniority. The civil service is headed by Head of Service, a senior member of the state civil service appointed by the state Governor. The head of service of Lagos state civil service is Hakeem Muri-Okunola.

== Organization ==
The civil service is mainly organized around the state ministries, headed by a commissioner appointed by the Governor of Lagos state. The Governor's appointments are confirmed by the State House of Representatives. There are 24 government ministries of Lagos State. In some cases a commissioner is responsible for more than one ministry, for example Ministry of Establishments, Training and Pensions may be combined as Lagos State Ministry of Establishments, Training and Pensions and the commissioners are assisted by a Permanent Secretary, who is a senior civil servant. The ministries are responsible for various parastatals (government-owned corporations) such as universities (Education) and the State Broadcasting Commission. The Lagos state ministry is coordinated by the Commissioner, assisted by a Permanent Secretary, who head the civil service departments.

In 2021, Microsoft teamed with the Lagos State Ministry of Science and Technology to train civil officials in Information technology (IT).

== List of ministries and their commissioners ==
Ministry	Incumbent commissioner
Finance	Rabiu Olowo
Economic Planning and Budget	Sam Egube
Waterfront Infrastructure Development	Kabiru Abdulahi
Commerce, Industry and Cooperatives	Oladele Ajayi
Tourism, Arts and Culture	Uzamat Akinbile-Yusuf
Education	Folashade Adefisayo
Science and Technology	Hakeem Fahm
Youth and Social Development	Segun Dawodu
Environment	Tunji Bello
Women Affairs and Poverty Alleviation	Bolaji Dada
Health	Akin Abayomi
Housing	Akinderu Fatai
Local Government and Community Affairs	Wale Ahmed
Justice	Moyo Onigbanjo
Works and Infrastructure	Ade Olayinka Akinsanya
Establishments, Training and Pensions	Ajibola Ponle
Physical Planning and Urban Development	Idris Salako
Energy and Mineral Resources	Lere Odusote
Special Duties and Intergovernmental Relations	Tayo Bangbose-Martins
Information and Strategy	Gbenga Omotoso
Transport	Fredric Oladeinde
Home Affairs	Anofi Olanrewaju Elegushi
Wealth Creation and Employment	Yetunde Arobieke
Agriculture	Gbolahan Lawal
