= List of government ministries of Lagos State =

This is a list of government ministries in Lagos State, Nigeria. Each ministry is coordinated by the Commissioner, assisted by a Permanent Secretary.

== List of ministries and their minister ==
Ministry	Minister
Finance	Yomi Oluyomi
Economic Planning and Budget	Mosopefolu George
Waterfront Infrastructure Development	Yakubu Adebayo Alebiosu
Commerce, Industry and Cooperatives	Mrs Folashade Ambrose-Medebem
Tourism, Arts and Culture	Mrs. Hon Hannatu Musa Musawa
Education	Mrs. Folashade Adefisayo
Science and Technology	Mr. Tunbosun Alake
Youth and Social Development	Mobolaji Ogunlende
Environment and Water Resources	Adetokunbo Wahab
Women Affairs and Poverty Alleviation	Mrs. Bolaji Cecilia Dada
Health	Prof. Akin Abayomi
Housing	Moruf Akinderu Fatai
Local Government and Community Affairs	Kayode Bolaji-Roberts
Justice	Lawal Pedro
Works and Infrastructure	Engr. Ganiyu Johnson
Establishments, Training and Pensions	Afolabi Ayantayo
Physical Planning and Urban Development	Dr. Olumide Abiodun Oluyinka
Energy and Mineral Resources	Mr. Olalere Odusote
Special Duties and Intergovernmental Relations	Mr. Seye Oladejo
Information and Strategy	Mr. Gbenga Omotoso
Transport	Dr. Frederic Oladeinde
Home Affairs	Prince Anofi Elegushi
Wealth Creation and Employment	Mrs. Yetunde Arobieke
Agriculture	Ms Abisola Olusanya
Lagos State Sport Commission	Mr. Sola Aiyepeku
Bureau of the Public Defender (BPD)	Mrs. Folashade Thomas-Orogan

== See also ==
- Lagos State
- Lagos State Executive Council
