= Executive Council of Lagos State =

Executive arm of a state government in Nigeria

- Cabinet of Lagos State
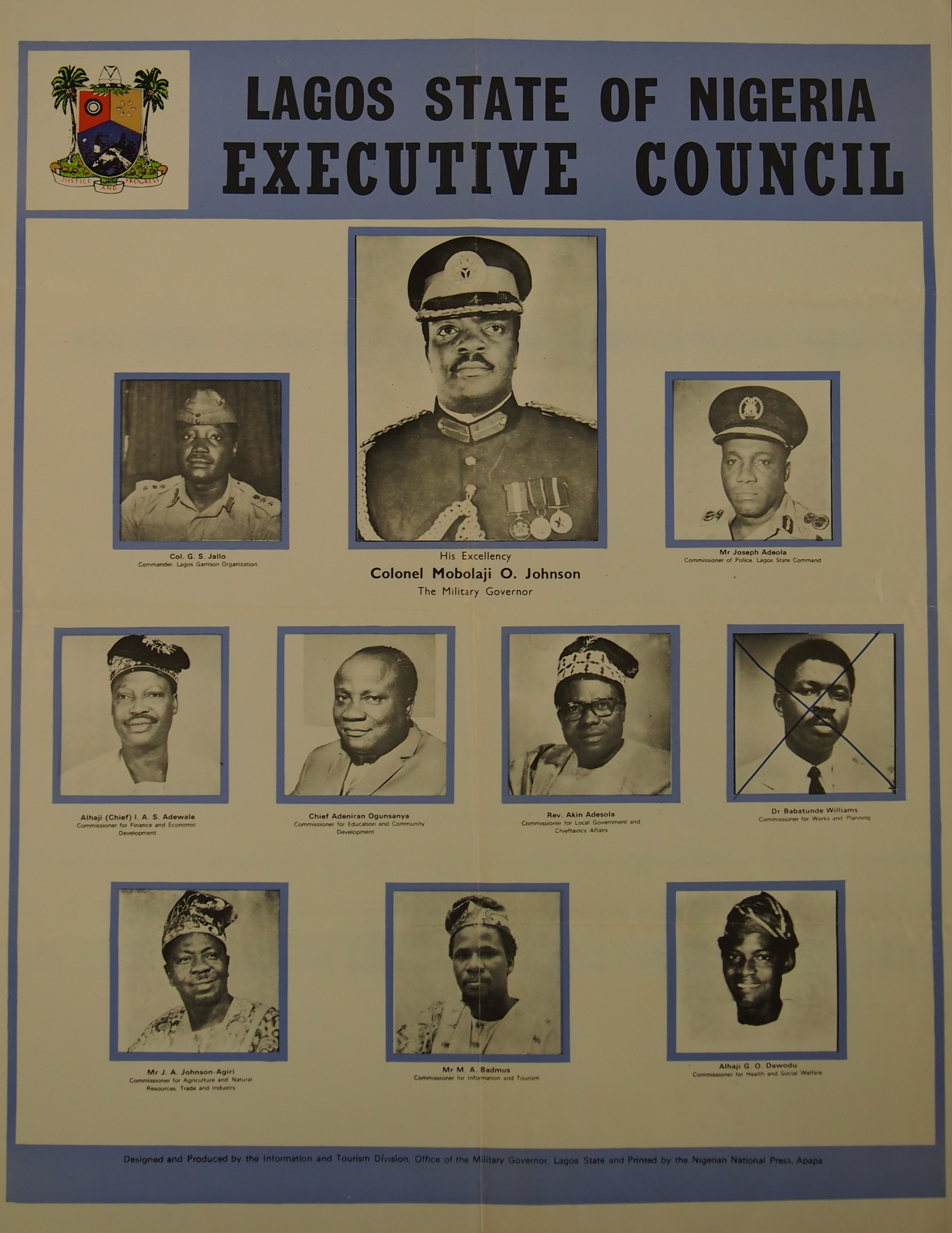
- The 1966 Lagos State Executive Council.
- Date formed: 5 June 2019

People and organisations
- Governor: Babajide Olusola Sanwo-Olu
- Deputy Governor: Kadri Obafemi Hamzat
- Member party: All Progressives Congress
- Status in legislature: All Progressives Congress led
- Opposition party: People's Democratic Party

History
- Election: 2019 Lagos State gubernatorial election
- Legislature term: Lagos State House of Assembly

The Executive Council of Lagos State (informally, the Cabinet of Lagos State) is the highest formal governmental body that plays important roles in the Government of Lagos State headed by the Governor of Lagos State. It consists of the Deputy Governor, Secretary to the State Government, Chief of Staff, Commissioners who preside over ministerial departments, and the Governor's special aides.

== Functions ==
The Executive Council exists to advise and direct the Governor. Their appointment as members of the Executive Council gives them the authority to execute power over their fields.

== Present cabinet 2023 till date ==
Office	Incumbent
Governor	Babajide Olusola Sanwo-Olu
Deputy Governor	Femi Hamzat
Secretary to the State Government	Bimbola Salu-Hundeyin
Head of Service	Bode Agoro
Chief of Staff	Tayo Ayinde
Deputy Chief of Staff	Gboyega Soyannwo
Commissioner of Agriculture	Abisola Olusanya
Commissioner of Commerce, Cooperatives, Trade & Investment	Folashade Ambrose-Medebem
Commissioner of Economic Planning and Budget	Mosopefolu George
Commissioner for Education	Folashade Adefisayo
Commissioner for Environment and Water Resources	Adetokunbo Wahab
Commissioner of Energy and Mineral Resources	Biodun Ogunleye
Commissioner of Establishment, Training and Pensions	Ajibola Ponnle
Commissioner of Finance	Abayomi Oluyomi
Commissioner of Health	Akin Abayomi
Commissioner of Home Affairs	Olanrewaju Ibrahim Layode
Commissioner of Housing	Moruf Akinderu Fatai
Commissioner of Information and Strategy	Gbenga Omotoso
Commissioner of Justice	Lawal Pedro (SAN)
Commissioner of Local Government and Community Affairs	Bolaji Robert
Commissioner of Physical Planning and Urban Development	Oluyinka Abiodun Olumide
Commissioner of Science and Technology	Tunbosun Alake
Commissioner of Special Duties and Intergovernmental Relations	Olugbenga Oyerinde
Commissioner of Tourism, Arts and Culture	Adetoke Benson-Awoyinka
Commissioner of Transportation	Oluwaseun Osiyemi
Commissioner of Women Affairs and Poverty Alleviation	Bolaji Dada
Commissioner of Youth and Social Development	Mobolaji Ogunlende
Special Adviser to the Deputy Governor	Engr. Olayinka Lukman
Special Adviser for Health	Dr. Olukoya Oreoluwa Finnih
Special Adviser for Internal Audit	Dr. Iyabo Oyeyemi
Special Adviser for GIS and Urban Planning	Olajide Babatunde
Special Adviser for Agriculture	Fashola Omotola
Special Adviser for Taxation and Tourism	Opeyemi Ogungbo
Special Adviser for Environment	Rotimi Akodu
Special Adviser for Tourism	Olayiwola Aregbe
Special Adviser for Central Business District (CBD)	Bola Olumegbon
Special Adviser for Housing	Barrister Olawunmi Bakare
Special Adviser on Political, Legislative and Civic Engagement	Tajudeen Afolabi
Special Adviser for Rural Development and Chieftaincy Affairs	Dr. Lanre Agbaje

== Past cabinet (2019-2023) ==
The past Executive Council was serving under the Babajide Sanwo-Olu administration who took office as the 15th Governor of Lagos State on 29 May 2019. In the months after the inauguration, Sanwo-Olu nominated various members of the Executive Council, mostly in batches on 15 July and 13 August. On 18 January 2020, a small reshuffle was conducted which moved three Commissioners to new roles, moved two Special Advisers to become Commissioners, and appointed three new Commissioners.

Office	Incumbent
Governor	Babajide Olusola Sanwo-Olu
Deputy Governor	Kadri Obafemi Hamzat
Secretary to the State Government	Folasade S. Jaji
Head of Service	Hakeem Muri-Okunola
Chief of Staff	Tayo Ayinde
Deputy Chief of Staff	Gboyega Soyannwo
Commissioner of Agriculture	Gbolahan Lawal
Commissioner of Commerce, Industry and Cooperatives	Lola Akande
Commissioner of Economic Planning and Budget	Sam Egube
Commissioner for Education	Folashade Adefisayo
Commissioner for Water Resources and the Environment	Tunji Bello
Commissioner of Energy and Mineral Resources	Olalere Odusote
Commissioner of Establishment, Training and Pensions	Ajibola Ponnle
Commissioner of Finance	Rabiu Onaolapo Olowo
Commissioner of Health	Akin Abayomi
Commissioner of Home Affairs	Anofi Olanrewaju Elegushi
Commissioner of Housing	Moruf Akinderu Fatai
Commissioner of Information and Strategy	Gbenga Omotoso
Commissioner of Justice	Moyo Onigbanjo
Commissioner of Local Government and Community Affairs	Wale Ahmed
Commissioner of Physical Planning and Urban Development	Idris Salako
Commissioner of Science and Technology	Hakeem Popoola Fahm
Commissioner of Special Duties and Intergovernmental Relations	Tayo Bamgbose-Martins
Commissioner of Tourism, Arts and Culture	Uzamat Akinbile Yussuf
Commissioner of Transportation	Frederic Oladeinde
Commissioner of Women Affairs and Poverty Alleviation	Bolaji Dada
Commissioner of Youth and Social Development	Segun Dawodu
Special Adviser for Agriculture	Ruth Bisola Olusanya
Special Adviser for Arts & Culture	Solomon Saanu Bonu
Special Adviser for Central Business Districts	Oyerinde Olugbenga Olanrewaju
Special Adviser for Civic Engagement	Aderemi Adebowale
Special Adviser for Commerce & Industries	Oladele Ajayi
Special Adviser for Drainage & Water Resources	Joe Igbokwe
Special Adviser for Education	Adetokunbo Wahab
Special Adviser for Housing	Toke Benson-Awoyinka
Special Adviser for Innovation & Technology	Tubosun Alake
Special Adviser on Political and Legislative Affairs	Afolabi Ayantayo
Special Adviser for Sustainable Development Goals & Lagos Global	Solape Hammond
Special Adviser for Transportation	Oluwatoyin Fayinka
Special Adviser for Urban Development	Ayuba Ganiu Adele
Special Adviser for Works & Infrastructure	Aramide Adeyoye

== See also ==
- Lagos State Government
