= Government of Lagos State =

Executive, legislative and judicial branches of Lagos State, Nigeria

Government of Lagos State Ìjọba Ìpínlẹ̀ Èkó
- Sub-national administrative division
- A map of Nigeria showing the location of Lagos State in red.
- Formation: 1967
- State: Lagos State
- Country: Nigeria
- Website: lagosstate.gov.ng

Legislative branch
- Legislature: Lagos State House of Assembly
- Speaker: Mudashiru Obasa
- Deputy Speaker: Mojisola Meranda
- Council members: Lagos State Executive Council
- Meeting place: Lagos State House of Assembly Complex

Executive branch
- Governor: Babajide Sanwo-Olu
- Main body: Lagos State Executive Council
- Deputy Governor: Femi Hamzat
- Secretary to the State Government: Folashade Sherifat Jaji
- Chief of Staff to the Governor: Tayo Ayinde
- Appointed by: Governor
- Headquarters: Government House, Alausa, Ikeja

Judicial branch
- Court: Lagos State High Court
- Chief Judge: Oluwafunmilayo Olajumoke Atilade
- Other courts: Lagos State Sharia Court of Appeal; Lagos State Customary Court of Appeal; Lagos State Magistrates' Courts; Lagos State District Courts; Customary courts of Lagos State; Sharia courts of Lagos State

Lagos State Government is the government of Lagos State, concerned with the administration of the state ministries. The government consists of the executive, legislative and Judiciary. The government is headed by the Governor who is the policy-maker and often assisted by the commissioners and other civil servants of the state.

== Office of the Governor ==
The Office of the Governor was created along with the creation of the state in 1967. It is currently headed by Babajide Sanwo-Olu, who is the fifteenth Governor of the State. This office is responsible for the effective coordination of all government activities for the good of the people of the State.

The state vision is "Making Lagos Africa's Model Mega City And Global Economic and Financial Hub", and the state policy thrust is "Poverty Eradication and Sustainable Economic Growth through Infrastructure Renewal and Development."

== Judiciary ==
The Judiciary is one of the three co-equal arms of the Lagos State Government. It is concerned with the interpretation of the laws of Lagos State government. The judiciary is headed by the Chief Judge of Lagos State, appointed by the Lagos State Governor with the approval of the Lagos State House of Assembly.

Distinguished members of the Judiciary include the Attorney-General and Lagos State Commissioner for Justice as well as the Chief Registrar. The Chief Registrar serves as the head of administration and accountant to the judiciary.

=== History of the judiciary ===
The Lagos State Judiciary was the first judiciary to be established in Nigeria, then known as the Colony Province Judiciary. The Magistrate Court was established first. The establishment of the Magistrate Court gave birth to the High Court, the then Lagos State Supreme Court. When the Supreme Court of Nigeria was founded, the Lagos Supreme Court metamorphosed into the High Court of the Federal Territory Lagos with the concurrent appointment of John Taylor as Chief Judge.

On May 27, 1967, the same year Lagos State was formed, the High Court and the Magistrate Court of the Federal Territory were merged to form the Lagos State Judiciary under the leadership of John Taylor, the pioneer Chief Judge of Lagos State. Taylor's tenure elapsed on November 7, 1973. He was succeeded by Justice Joseph Adefarasin, appointed on November 1, 1974. He served in that capacity for 9 years until April 24, 1985, when his tenure ended. He was succeeded by Justice Candide Adeyemi Johnson, appointed on April 25, 1985, a day after Justice Joseph left the office. He spent 4 years in office and Justice Ligali Ayorinde succeeded him on July 10, 1989. He served in that capacity for 6 years i.e. between July 1989 to April 1995. In August 2014, Oluwafunmilayo Olajumoke Atilade was appointed as Chief Judge, sworn in by Ade Ipaye, Attorney General of Lagos State.

=== Courts ===
The Lagos State courts consist of three levels of courts. The High Court is an appellate court that operates under discretionary review, meaning that the Court can choose which cases to hear by granting writs of certiorari. It is the court of last resort. The other two levels are the Magistrates and the Customary Court.

In addition to the court, the judiciary also consists of the Judicial Service Commission, with statutory duties that include the promotion and appointment of judicial staff as well as other disciplinary functions. The Chief Judge serves as the commission's chairman.

== Legislature ==
The legislature or state house assembly is one of the three co-equal arms of the State Government concerned with lawmaking. The legislature consists of elected members from each constituency of the state. The head of the legislature is the Speaker, who is elected by the house.

The building of the legislature is situated inside the Lagos State Government house at Alausa in Ikeja central business district, Lagos State.

The legislative function of the legislature is to make laws by passing bills, which must be endorsed by the two-thirds majority of the house. Following the endorsement by the two-thirds majority, the bill is presented to the Governor, who will sign the bill to become law. The assembly assess and approve the annual budget of the state government on presentation by the governor. The assembly also play a significant role in the appointment of the state commissioners, Chief Judges and other top officials by the Governor.

== Executive ==
The executive branch is one of the three co-equal arms of the State Government, concerned with policy making and implementation of bills. The executive is responsible for the daily administration of the state. Members of the executive include the Governor, deputy governors, and commissioners. There are also other top officials of the state, such as the head of service.

The executives overseas the ministries. Each ministry is headed and coordinated by a commissioner, assisted by a permanent secretary.

=== List of ministries and their commissioners ===
Ministry	Incumbent commissioner
Finance	Mustapha Akinkunmi
Economic Planning and Budget	Akinyemi Ashade
Waterfront Infrastructure Development	Adebowale Akinsanya
Commerce, Industry and Cooperatives	Rotimi Ogunleye
Lagos State Ministry of Tourism, Arts and Culture	Toke Benson-Awoyinka
Science and Technology	Olufemi Odubiyi
Youth, and Social Development	Uzamat Akinbile Yussuf
Environment	Babatunde Adejare
Women Affairs and Poverty Alleviation	Lola Akande
Health	Olajide Idris
Housing	Gbolahan Lawal
Local Government and Community Affairs	Muslim Folami
Justice	Adeniji Kazeem
Works and Infrastructure	Ganiyu Johnson
Establishments, Training and Pensions	Akintola Benson
Physical Planning and Urban Development	Wasiu Anifowoshe
Energy and Mineral Resources	Olawale Oluwo
Special Duties and Intergovernmental Relations	Seye Oladejo
Information and Strategy	Steve Ayorinde
Transport	Dayo Mobereola
Home Affairs	Abdul-Hakeem Abdul-Lateef
Wealth Creation and Employment	Babatunde Durosimi-Etti
Agriculture	Oluwatoyin Suarau

== See also ==
- Lagos State Executive Council
- Presidential Lodge
