= Lagos State Ministry of Environment =

Lagos's Ministry

Ministry overview
- Formed: 1979
- Jurisdiction: Government of Lagos State
- Headquarters: Block 16, The Secretariat Annex, Alausa, Ikeja, Lagos State
- Ministry executives: Tunji Bello, Commissioner; Joe Igbokwe, Special Adviser to His Excellency on Drainage Services and Water Resources; Belinda Aderonke Odeneye, Permanent Secretary, Ministry of the Environment
- Website: https://moelagos.gov.ng/

The Lagos State Ministry of Environment is the state government ministry, charged with the responsibility to plan, devise and implement the state policies on Environmental Management.

Alhaji Lateef Jakande, the first elected Governor of Lagos State, carved out the Ministry of Environment from the then Ministry of Works and Transport. The Ministry of Environment and Physical Planning merged with the Ministry of Physical Planning to become the Ministry of Environment and Physical Planning. The former Governor of Lagos State, Asiwaju Bola Ahmed Tinubu, separated the Office of Environment from Physical Planning in 2003 and he upgraded the office of Environment to a Ministry.

The Ministry's main objective is to build a cleaner, healthier, and more sustainable environment that would promote tourism, economic growth, and citizen well-being.

Bello took the oath of office as Commissioner of the Ministry of Environment before Governor Babajide Olusola Sanwo-Olu on August 20, 2019.

The Lagos State Government under the administration of Governor Babajide Sanwo-Olu has officially released "Citi Monitor," an online tool for tracking and reporting all environmental violations.

== History ==
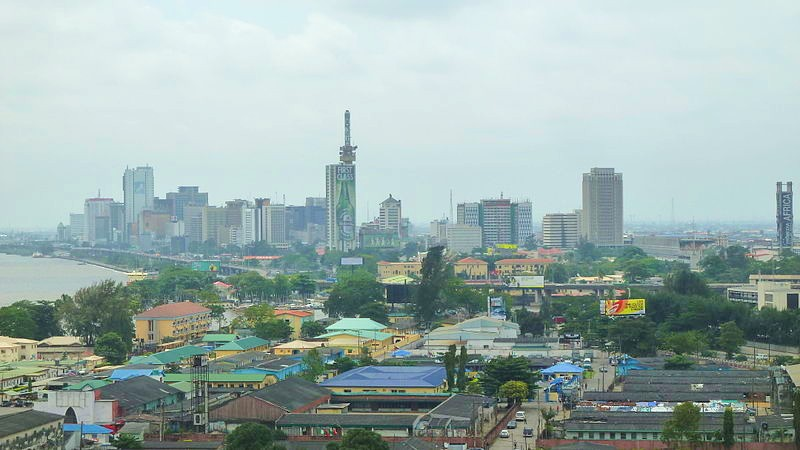
Victoria Island Lagos

During the administration of Asiwaju Bola Ahmed Tinubu, the office of Environment was separated from Physical Planning and upgraded the present office of the Environment to a Ministry. In the year 2005, two offices were created under the Ministry namely: Office of Environmental Services (OES) and Office of Drainage Services (ODS).

In 2015, following an Executive Order by His Excellency, Mr. Akinwunmi Ambode, the two offices which were OES and ODS were merged into a single Ministry which was the Ministry of Environment. In January 2018, the Office of Drainage Services was moved out of Ministry of Environment to Lagos State Public Works Corporation (LSPWC) which was under the Ministry of Works. This reform in the Ministry of Environment was during the Akinwunmi Ambode administration.

== Parastatals ==
- Lagos State Environmental Protection Agency (LASEPA)
- Lagos State Waste Management Authority (LAWMA)
- Lagos State Parks and Garden Agency (LASPARK)
- Lagos Water Corporation (LWC)
- Lagos State Water Regulatory Commission (LSWRC)
- Lagos State Signage and Advertisement Agency (LASAA)
- Kick Against Indiscipline(KAI) and
- Lagos State Waste Water Management Office (LSWMO)

== See also ==
- Lagos State Ministry of Works and Infrastructure
- Lagos State Executive Council
