= Lagos state environmental sanitation corps =

Government agency of Lagos State, Nigeria

The Lagos State Environmental Sanitation Corps (LAGESC) is a government agency that is responsible for facilitating a clean environment in Lagos, Nigeria and to enforce notices such as 'Seal up Notice', 'Demolition Notice' etc.

== History ==
LAGESC was established by a law signed by the former governor of Lagos State Akinwunmi Ambode on 1 March 2017. It is an agency under the Lagos State Ministry of Environment.

The Kick Against Indiscipline (KAI) Brigade was replaced with LAGESC with inauguration on 30 June 2017. The Agency is run by a Governing Board.

== Activities ==
One of the major duties of LAGESC is to tackle street trading, indiscriminate dumping of refuse, pollution and crossing of highways. In January 2020, 36 people were arrested for allegedly crossing express highways instead of using the safer overhead pedestrian bridges. During the ban of street traders in Oyingbo, LAGESC was commissioned around the market area and surrounding streets to arrest street traders. On 21 February 2022, the agency collaborated with the Lagos State task force agency on an exercise to remove waste along the Mushin/Olosha road associated with roadside traders. Roadside traders impede vehicular movement leading to traffic congestion. This exercise demolished shanties and kiosks on the walkways. Traders found displaying their goods on the road were arrested.

== See also ==
- Lagos State Ministry of Environment
- Lagos State Executive Council
