= Lagos State Fire Service =

Agency overview
- Formed: 1972
- Jurisdiction: Government of Lagos State
- Headquarters: Alausa Fire station (HQ), Governor Road. Ikeja, Lagos
- Employees: 553 Operational Staff including 9 Non Uniform Staff for various fields.
- Agency executives: Mrs. Adeseye Margaret Abimbola, Director; Mr. Ogabi Olajide Adeshina, Deputy Head 1; Mrs. Alelamole Jemilat Abiola, Deputy Head II
- Website: fireservice.lagosstate.gov.ng

The Lagos State Fire Service is the statutory fire and rescue service for Lagos State.

Established in 1972 by the Lagos State Law Cap.42 of 1972, it is primarily tasked with managing fire emergencies in Lagos State. The service is responsible for fire protection and community safety among residents and visitors across the state.

The Lagos State Fire Service was established on August 31, 1972, with an Expatriate Chief Fire Officer, Sir Allan Flemming, as the first Chief Fire Officer with a three-man crew.

In 2021, Governor Babajide Sanwo-Olu appointed Mrs Margaret Adeseye, Director of the Lagos State Fire and Rescue Service.

The Lagos State Fire Service employs 553 operational personnel, including 9 non-uniformed personnel in various fields.

== Activities ==
The fire and rescue service was upgraded to an agency status during Governor Babajide Sanwo-Olu's administration, in pursuance of Mr Sanwo-Olu’s THEMES Agenda. The agency have various appliances at their disposal.

Apart from the continuous training of its personnel, the Agency Under Adeseye recruited 100 firemen in 2020 to boost its staff strength in order to enhance its operations. Mrs. Adeseye Margaret prioritized the personnel welfare since she assumed office. It is not surprising that under her leadership, the Service has received several appreciation and commendation letters from corporate organizations and private individuals.

SANWO-OLU DELIVERS 11 FIRE STATIONS IN SEVEN YEARS

The Lagos State Fire and Rescue Service has disclosed that the administration of Governor Babajide Olusola Sanwo-Olu has delivered 11 fire stations and one Public-Private Partnership (PPP) fire station across the State within seven years as part of ongoing efforts to strengthen emergency response and fire safety infrastructure.

The Commissioner for Special Duties and Intergovernmental Relations, Gbenga Oyerinde, made this known during the 2026 Ministerial Press Briefing held at the Bagauda Kaltho Press Centre, Alausa, where the agency presented its 2025 Activity Report.

According to the report, the Service responded to 1,972 emergency calls in 2025, comprising 1,685 fire incidents, 139 rescue calls, 129 salvage operations, 16 collapsed building incidents, and three gas explosions. A total of 473 victims were rescued alive, while 133 fatalities were recorded.

The report further revealed that properties worth an estimated ₦118.32 billion were saved, while losses stood at ₦19.72 billion, representing an asset protection ratio of 6.1 to 1.

In the area of fire prevention and public sensitization, the Service inspected 8,791 facilities, issued 7,997 fire safety certificates, and conducted 590 advocacy engagements through media appearances, sensitization programmes, stakeholder meetings, station tours, and school visits.

The Service also recorded major achievements in personnel and operational development, including the recruitment of 150 personnel, promotion of 105 officers, an 8.2 percent improvement in emergency response time, and a 26.06 percent reduction in fire outbreaks.

Newly commissioned fire stations include Somolu, Okota, and Tolu-Ajegunle, while stations at Oworonshoki, Yaba, and Ikotun are currently under construction.

The Controller General of the Service, Margaret Abimbola Adeseye, described the achievements as a significant milestone and a major boost to the agency’s operational capacity.

Despite these developments, the agency identified challenges such as prank emergency calls, traffic congestion, attacks on firefighters, and restricted access to emergency scenes.

The Service, however, reaffirmed its commitment to improved emergency response, continuous personnel training, and strict enforcement of fire safety regulations, Adeseye concluded.

The report also highlighted that between January and April 2026, the Service responded to 721 emergency incidents, rescued 99 victims alive, and saved properties valued at ₦43.26 billion.

Fadairo Maria Abidemi Senior Public Affairs Officer Lagos State Fire and Rescue Service May 19, 2026.

== Vision ==
To ensure fast response to fire calls, rescue operations, and other related emergencies, as well as proactive fire prevention measures and training.

== Mission ==
To provide effective service delivery in fire prevention and attack with the goal of minimizing deaths, injuries, and economic losses caused by fire to a bare minimum.

== Stations ==
Headquartered in Alausa, the service currently has a total of 29 fire stations across Lagos State. The stations can be found in:

- Alausa
- Agege
- Badagry
- Lekki-phase II
- Epe 1
- Sari-Iganmu
- Ikeja
- Ikotun
- Ikorodu
- Ilupeju
- Isolo
- Ojo
- Ejigbo
- Abesan
- Bolade, Oshodi
- Oworonshoki
- Ijede
- Ajegunle Apapa
- Ijegun Egba
- Oniru
- Ebute Elefun
- Imota
- Dolphin
- Epe II
- Yaba
- Ibeju Lekki
- Somolu
- Tolu-Ajegunle
- Okota
