= Mosopefolu George =

Nigerian politician and economist

Mosopefolu George (also known as Ope George) is a Nigerian politician, economist, and finance professional. He serves as the Commissioner for Economic Planning and Budget in Lagos State.

== Early life and education ==
Mosopefolu George was born on 20 February 1974 in Lagos State. He attended Corona School, Ikoyi for his primary education and later studied at Federal Government College, Ijanikin, Lagos, for his secondary schooling. He began his tertiary education at the University of Lagos before transferring to the University of Leicester in England, where he obtained a bachelor's degree in Business Economics in 1996.

== Career ==
George began his professional career in 1997 with the Global Markets team at Citibank N.A., London, where he worked on emerging‑market loan syndication and project finance in Central and Eastern Europe, the Middle East, and Africa. In 2001, he joined the Corporate Finance division of KPMG in London, where he worked on private finance initiative projects. After leaving KPMG in 2004, he joined the telecommunications company SAGEM France.

From 2007 to 2009, he served as Senior Special Assistant on Economic Matters to the governor of Lagos State, Babatunde Raji Fashola. He then acted as managing director of Lekki Worldwide Investments Limited, a position he held until 2015.

In February 2022, he was appointed Special Adviser on Public‑Private Partnerships to the Governor of Lagos State.

On 16 September 2023, George was sworn in as the Commissioner for Economic Planning and Budget in Lagos State.

== Personal life ==
Mosopefolu George is married to Oluwafemi George, and they have three sons.
