= Lagos Waste Management Authority =

Management of Waste and refuse disposal

Department overview
- Formed: 1991
- Jurisdiction: Government of Lagos State
- Headquarters: No. 3 Iddo - Yard, Ijora Olopa, Lagos State.
- Department executive: Dr. Muyiwa Gbadegesin, Managing Director
- Website: www.lawma.gov.ng

The Lagos Waste Management Authority (LAWMA) is a parastatal of the government of Lagos State responsible for managing waste generated in Lagos State through a waste collection, transportation and disposal structure. The goal of Lagos Waste Management Authority is to improve the environment with the impact of achieving positive and significant change in living conditions regarding health and sanitation.

== History ==
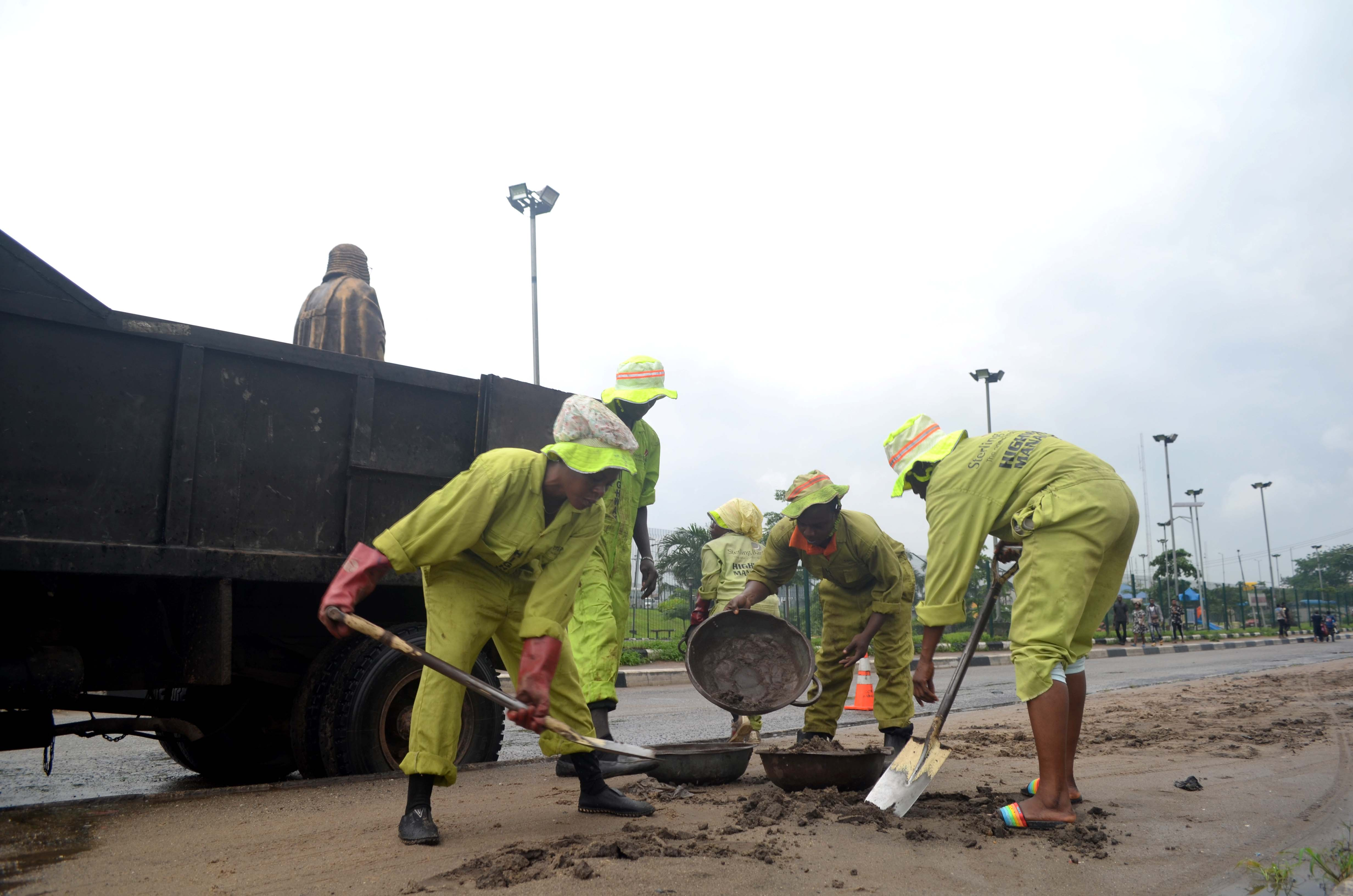

The Lagos State Refuse Disposal Board (LSRDB) was instituted under Edict No. 9 of 1977, which was the first of its kind in West Africa. The Board was given the responsibilities of environmental sanitation and domestic refuse collection and disposal in Lagos State.

The board was renamed the Lagos State Waste Management Authority via the enactment of a new Law – Edict No. 55 of 1991, which conferred on the Authority additional responsibilities for the collection and disposal of municipal and industrial wastes as well as provision of commercial waste services to the State and Local Governments of Lagos State.

The board metamorphosed over the years into the agency known today as the Lagos Waste Management Authority (LAWMA) by virtue of the LAWMA Law 2007, and accrued added responsibilities ranging from management of commercial, industrial, and medical waste streams, highway sanitation, cleaning of drainage and other water bodies, to construction and demolition of waste management, among others. LAWMA works closely with the Lagos State Ministry of Environment and has initiated reforms regarding collection of waste bills and also aims to increase waste recycling.

Residents have been urged by the Lagos Waste Management Authority (LAWMA) to adopt the habit of recycling waste items.

In 2020, The Lagos Waste Management Authority (LAWMA) developed an academy to provide quality education, appropriate involvement, and suitable sensitization in order to assist people in making educated and strategic waste management decisions in the state.

== Activities ==
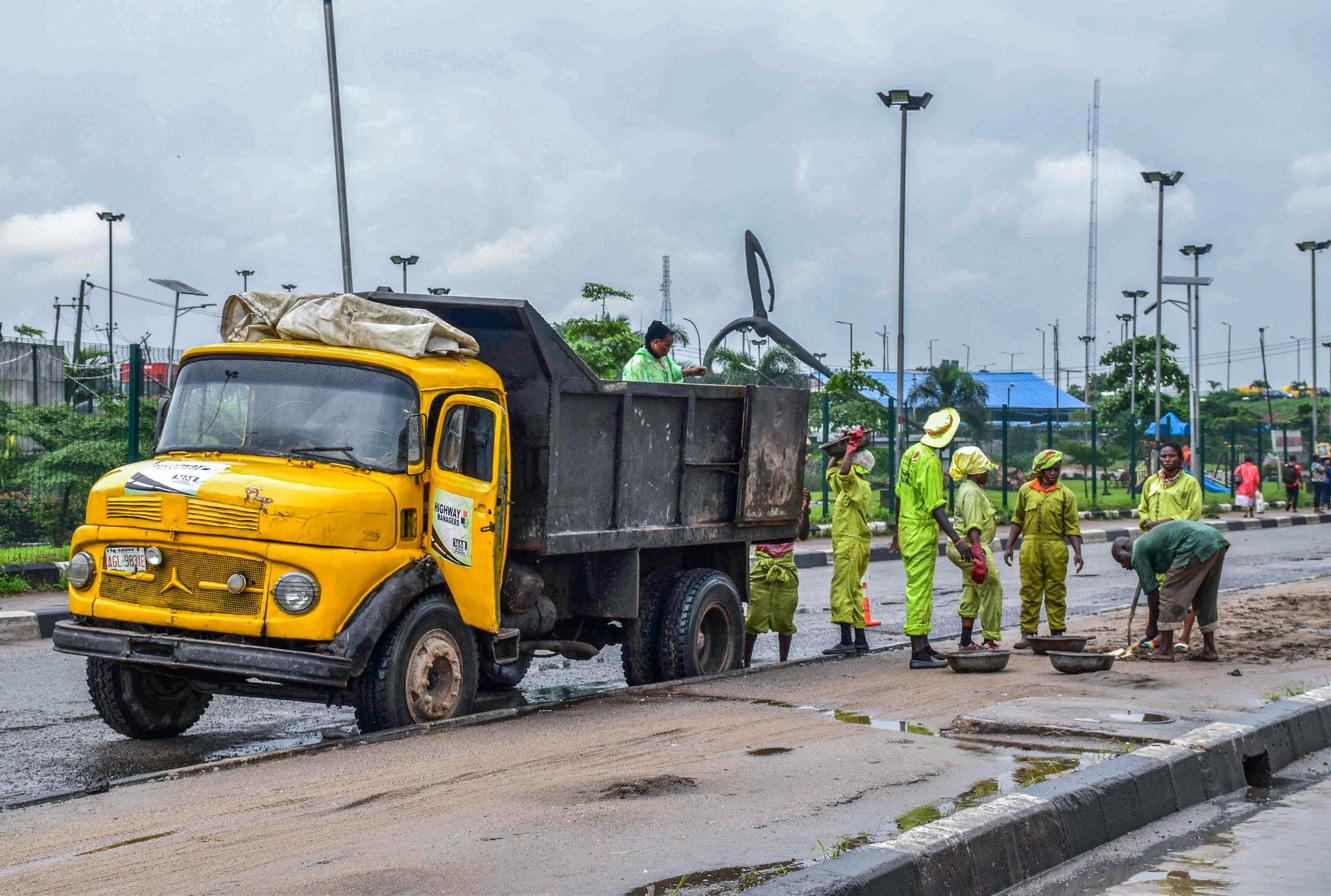
LAWMA at work in Ojota, Lagos

1. In 2011, GMI awarded a grant to the LAWMA for studies evaluating the feasibility of capturing landfill gas from the Abule Egba and Solous Landfills. Based on their findings, LAWMA developed a landfill gas energy project to the local residents which serve as a reliable source of electricity.
2. 15 September 2020, LAWMA launched the LAWMA Academy. LAWMA Academy offers several programmes certifications in waste management and services aimed at promoting the Reduce, Reuse and Recycle practices of waste management.
3. The Lagos Waste Management Authority (LAWMA) carried out a 48-hour shutdown and maintenance of the Olusosun landfill in November 2021.
4. In 2021, LAWMA partnered with the Chartered Institution of Waste Management (CIWN) for the inclusion of certified courses in resource management which resulted from the collaboration of LAWMA Academy and an environmental consulting firm in London UK, called SafeEnviro.
5. In August 2021, Governor Babajide Sanwo-Olu of Lagos State has finalized plans to add 102 new locally made waste compactor vehicles to the state Waste Management Authority's (LAWMA), marking a significant step toward a cleaner Lagos.
6. World Clean Up Day was celebrated at the Ilashe/Ibeshe beach of Lagos State by LAWMA, September 2021 and the event was used as an avenue to sensitise residents about their responsibility to the environment and to clean-up the water ways.
7. On the 13th of February 2022, LAWMA commenced the fumigation of dumpsites across the state, starting with the Igando Solous dumpsite in line with the agenda for a cleaner Lagos.
8. The Lagos state Government, Babajide Sanwo-Olu launches a programme for cleaner Lagos called "Adopt-a-Bin".
9. Lagos State Government through LAWMA distributes 40,000 waste bins to aid recycling.

== Functions and impact to the community ==
Lawma manages the daily collections of waste from household, businesses and public space across the communities.

Lawma is involved in promoting and recycling of waste through various programs.

Lawma has a regulatory body enforcing sanitation and environmental rules and also imposing fines for non compliance.

Lawma's effort have contributed to clean and healthy streets /roads, reduced waste in the public space and create awareness of environmental sustainability in Lagos at large.

== See also ==
- Lagos State Ministry of Environment & Water Resources
- Lagos state executive council
