= Lagos Theatre, Igando =

Performance theatre

Coordinates: 6°33′15″N 3°14′55″E

The Lagos Theatre, Igando is a performance theatre located in Lagos, Nigeria. It is one of four theatres established by the Lagos State Government's Ministry of Tourism, Arts, and Culture during Governor Akinwunmi Ambode's administration. The other theatres are located in Oregun, Epe, and Badagry.

== History ==
In May 2017, Governor Ambode entrusted Terra Kulture Studio Limited, led by Bolanle Austen-Peters, with the contract to construct the theatre The project was officially commissioned on May 15, 2019. According to Ambode, the theatre's construction was deemed necessary not only to serve as a performance platform that generates income for artists and entertainers but also to create opportunities in the tourism and hospitality sectors, ultimately benefiting all aspects of the host communities through its ripple effects.

== Events ==
- The 2024 edition of Civic Fest Africa took place at the Lagos Theatre, Igando.
- The theatre hosted the 2023 World Theatre Day celebration, organized by the Lagos State Council for Arts and Culture.
