= Tunbosun Alake =

Nigerian politician

Tunbosun Alake is a Nigerian businessperson, politician and currently serves as Commissioner of Science and Technology in Lagos State, Nigeria.

== Education ==
Tunbosun Alake has a Bachelor of Science in Computer & Information Science and a Master of Business Administration (General Management). He obtained both degrees from Temple University in Philadelphia.

== Career ==
Tunbosun Alake first worked in New York immediately after obtaining his master's degree before he came back to Nigeria for the National Youth Service Corps (NYSC).

He later worked at Film House Cinemas as General Manager of Information Technology & Innovation. Later on, he moved on to IPNX Nigeria Limited, where he was Head of Business Intelligence & Data Analytics.

His political career started when he was appointed to serve as Special Adviser on Innovation and Technology to Lagos State Governor, Babajide Sanwo-Olu. Following this, he was appointed as the Commissioner of Science and Technology of Lagos State in 2023.

== Personal life ==
He is the son of the current Minister for Solid Minerals of Nigeria, Dele Alake.
