= Lagos State Governor's House =

Official residence of the governor of Lagos State

Lagos State House
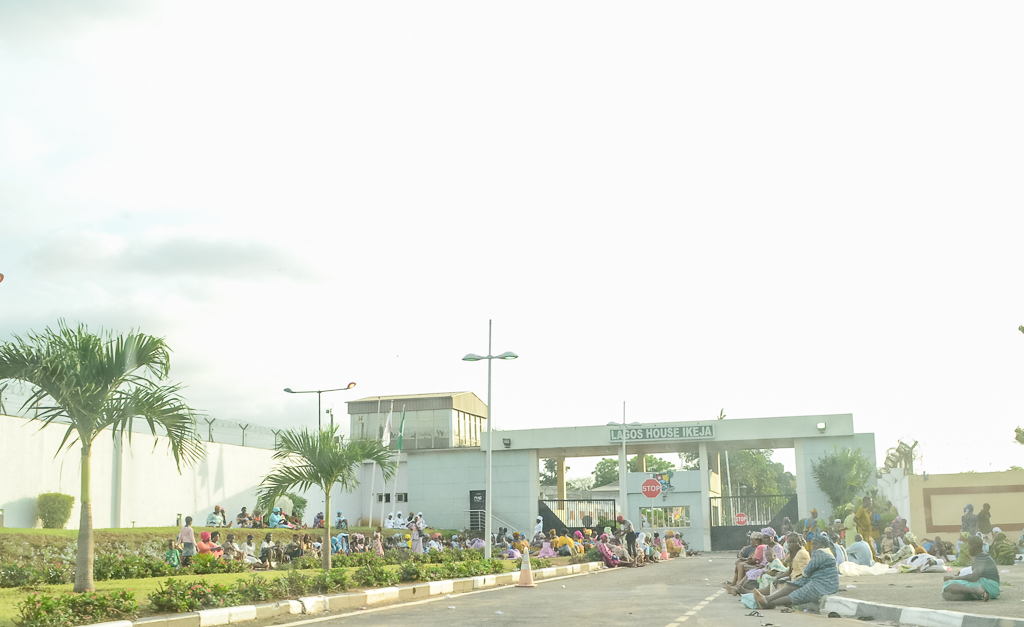
- Main gate of Lagos House, Ikeja
- Interactive map of the Lagos State House area

General information
- Location: Governor's Avenue, Alausa, Ikeja, Lagos State, Nigeria; Marina, Lagos Island, Lagos State, Nigeria
- Current tenants: Babajide Sanwo-Olu, Governor of Lagos State and Lagos State first family.
- Completed: 1896 (Marina House); 2007 (Ikeja House)
- Owner: Lagos State Government

Lagos State House, otherwise known as The Governor's Mansion, is the official residence of the governor of Lagos State. Lagos State has two governor's residences, one at Marina in Lagos Island and another at Ikeja on the Mainland. Both residences are used for official and residential purposes.

While all previous governors in Lagos State have lived in the Lagos State House at Marina, the past governor of Lagos State, Akinwunmi Ambode is the first governor to live in the Lagos State House in Ikeja. The governor moved into the Ikeja residence on resumption of office as the governor of Lagos State on 29 May 2015, citing punctuality as one of the reasons for his movement to the Ikeja Governor's House.

The governor's lodge at Ikeja was commissioned in 2007 by Asiwaju Bola Tinubu, although the building was started in 1988 by Admiral Mike Akhigbe. The Marina lodge dates to the colonial period, when Lagos' British administrator Sir Gilbert Thomas Carter commissioned it in 1896.
