= Mosunmola Arinola Dipeolu =

Nigerian jurist

Hon. Justice Mosunmola Arinola Dipeolu

Chief Judge of Ogun State
- Incumbent
- Assumed office 22 October 2018

Personal details
- Born: 5 May 1959 (age 67) Abeokuta South, Ogun State, Nigeria
- Education: University of Buckingham, Nigerian Law School
- Occupation: Jurist

Mosunmola Arinola Dipeolu (born 5 May 1959) is a Nigerian jurist who serves as the Chief Judge of Ogun State. She has worked within the judicial systems of Lagos and Ogun states, and was appointed Chief Judge in 2018.

== Early life and education ==
Dipeolu was born on 5 May 1959 in Abeokuta South Local Government Area of Ogun State. She attended St. Mary's Primary School, Broad Street, Lagos, from 1965 to 1970. In 1971, she enrolled at Abeokuta Girls’ Grammar School, where she completed her secondary education in 1976. She then proceeded to Ahmadiyya College, Agege, Lagos State, for her Higher School Certificate (HSC), finishing in 1978.

She studied law at the University of Buckingham in England, earning her LL.B between January 1979 and February 1981. After completing her degree, she attended the Nigerian Law School, Victoria Island, Lagos, and was called to the Bar in July 1982. She undertook her National Youth Service Corps (NYSC) programme with the Nigerian Ports Authority, Broad Street, Lagos.

== Career ==
Dipeolu began her professional career at the Lagos State Ministry of Justice, Alausa, Ikeja, where she worked from August 1982 to December 1984.

In January 1985, she joined the Ogun State Judiciary as a Magistrate. She served in this capacity until 4 May 1999, when she was elevated to the position of High Court Judge. After a period in private practice, she was sworn in on 22 October 2018 as the Chief Judge of Ogun State, and continues to hold the position.
