= Lagos Bureau of Statistics =

The Lagos Bureau of Statistics is a department in the Lagos State Ministry of Economic Planning and Budget concerned with the coordination of statistical activities in Lagos State, the most populous state of Nigeria. The department focusses on the collections of statistical data on topics including population, housing, finance, education, health, agriculture, and social welfare services. The department also collaborates with international bodies, federal, state and local governments, and other statistical agencies.

== Publications ==
Digest of statistics is one of the annual publication of the department. It contains the statistical data on the Socioeconomic activities of the State. It features data on the State population, Traffic Management, Waste Management and Environment. It also provides information on Motor Vehicle Registration, Road Accidents, Traffic Management, Price Index Housing, among other sectors. Other publications includes Abstract of Local Government Statistics, Basic Statistical Hotline, Price Statistics Bulletin, Statistical year book and Motor Vehicles Statistics.

== Vision ==
To continue to serve as the state's one-stop shop for high-quality, dependable, and stable statistics.

== Mission ==
Assuring a digitalized, effective, and timely statistics system for planning, policy formation, and decision-making.
