= Presidential Lodge =

Former Nigerian presidential palace

General information
- Architectural style: Neoclassical, Palladian
- Location: The Marina, Lagos, Lagos State, Nigeria
- Owner: Government of Lagos State

Design and construction
- Architect: British Colonial

The Presidential Lodge also known as State House Marina, is a public building that served as the former presidential palace of the President of Nigeria, located at the Marina in Lagos, Nigeria. The State House which has housed the colonial Governor-General and past leaders of Nigeria was officially handed over to the Lagos State Government. The documents were signed by Governor Akinwunmi Ambode and his predecessor, Babatunde Raji Fashola. It concluded the request for the change of ownership that has gone on for over two decades. In a statement by Governor Ambode while signing the document, he noted that "it was gratifying that the long journey spanning about two decades had finally come to an end."

== History ==
It was constructed during the British colonial period in 1896. The lodge was first occupied by Lord Lugard as the official residence and the office of the Governor of Nigeria in 1914. At the time, it was known as Government House. Since then, it has housed several Presidents and Military Heads of State.

After the federal government moved to Abuja in 1991 the palace lost its function as the new seat of the president became Aso Villa.

=== Transfer to Lagos State ===
The former residence was handed over to the Government of Lagos State in 2017. Since the transfer of ownership, the State House Marina has fully become an activity center for government activities. In December 2024, Governor Babajide Sanwo-Olu and the Federal Ministry of Housing and Urban Development reached a consensus to work on issues of land administration in Lagos. This agreement took place at the State House in Marina, Lagos.

== See also ==
- Iga Idunganran, residence of the Oba of Lagos
- Lagos State Governor's House
