= Toke Benson-Awoyinka =

Commissioner for Tourism, Arts, and Culture, Lagos State

Commissioner of Tourism, Arts and Culture
- Incumbent
- Assumed office 2023
- Governor: Babajide Sanwo-Olu
- Preceded by: Uzamat Akinbile Yussuf

Personal details
- Education: Lagos State University

Toke Benson-Awoyinka (born 12th June, 1967) is a Nigerian lawyer, politician and philanthropist. She was the Special Adviser to Lagos State Governor Babajide Sanwoolu on Housing in 2019 and in 2023 was appointed as the Commissioner for Tourism, Arts & Culture.

== Life ==
Born on 12 of June, 1967. Started her education at Marywood Grammar School, Ebute-Metta and then Lagos State University where she graduated with a Bachelor of Laws and was called to the Nigerian Bar in 1990.

Awoyinka started her career at Standard Insurers and later moved to litigation with Yemi Peters & Co and to B.O Benson Law Office. Before she was appointed as Special Adviser to Lagos State Governor on Housing in 20219 and then Commissioner for Tourism, Arts & Culture in 2023.

== See also ==
- List of government ministries of Lagos State
