= Afolabi Ayantayo =

Nigerian politician and administrator

Hon. Afolabi Ayantayo

Commissioner for Establishments, Training and Pensions
- Incumbent
- Assumed office September 2023
- Governor: Babajide Sanwo-Olu
- Preceded by: Ajibola Ponnle

Personal details
- Born: Lagos State, Nigeria
- Education: University of Lagos (B.Sc.)
- Occupation: Politician, Administrator

Afolabi Ayantayo is a Nigerian politician and administrator who currently serves as the Honourable Commissioner for Establishments, Training and Pensions in Lagos State. He was appointed to the position by Governor Babajide Sanwo-Olu and sworn in on September 13, 2023.

== Early life and education ==
Afolabi Ayantayo was born in Lagos State. He pursued higher education at the University of Lagos (UNILAG), where he obtained a degree in Mass Communication. He is also known for his interest in crime fiction and literary arts.

== Career ==
Ayantayo has previously served as Special Adviser on Political and Legislative Affairs.

In 2023, after Governor Babajide Sanwo-Olu's re-election, Ayantayo was nominated, screened by the Lagos State House of Assembly, and sworn in as Commissioner for Establishments, Training and Pensions in September 2023.
