= Sylvester Ogunkelu =

Nigerian politician

Hon. Sylvester Oluwadahunsi Ogunkelu

Member, Lagos State House of Assembly
- Incumbent
- Assumed office 2019
- Constituency: Epe Constituency II

Personal details
- Born: 1 October 1979 (age 46) Epe, Lagos, Nigeria
- Party: All Progressives Congress (APC)
- Education: Lagos State University (B.Sc, MPA)
- Occupation: Politician, Administrator
- Nickname: Skrtel

Sylvester Oluwadahunsi Ogunkelu (born 1 October 1979) is a Nigerian politician and tax administrator who currently serves as a member of the Lagos State House of Assembly, representing Epe Constituency II.

== Early life and education ==
Ogunkelu was born on 1 October 1979 in the Epe Division of Lagos State. He attended Army Barracks Primary School, Epe, from 1987 to 1992. He proceeded to Alaro Community High School, Iraye Oke, Epe, for his secondary education, graduating in 1998.

He pursued higher education at Lagos State University (LASU), where he obtained a Bachelor of Science (B.Sc.) degree in Business Administration in 2004. He later returned to the same institution to earn a Master's degree in Public Administration (MPA) with a specialisation in Human Resources and Personnel Management in 2014.

== Career ==
Before joining mainstream politics, Ogunkelu built a career in tax administration with the Lagos State Civil Service. He worked with the Lagos State Board of Internal Revenue Service (LIRS) as a Revenue Supervisor, Head of Operations and Informal Sector Service at Ajah Mini Tax Office, and also as a Direct Assessment Tax Handler and Companies Enumerator at the Epe Tax Office. He is a member of the Chartered Institute of Public Management of Nigeria and an Associate Member of the Institute of Business Strategy (IBS).

Ogunkelu's political service began at the local government level. Between 2015 and 2016, he served as the Supervisor for Health in the Caretaker Committee of Eredo Local Council Development Area (LCDA). In 2019, he contested and won the seat to represent Epe Constituency II in the Lagos State House of Assembly. He was re-elected for a second term in the 2023 general elections. In the 10th Assembly, he serves as the Chairman of the House Committee on Physical Planning and Urban Development. In this critical role, he oversees the state's urban planning regulations, building control policies, and development permits.
