= Lagos Water Corporation =

Principal water supplier in Lagos State, Nigeria

Agency overview
- Formed: 1986
- Preceding agency: Federal Water Supply
- Jurisdiction: Lagos State Government
- Agency executive: Muminu Badmus, Group managing director
- Website: www.lagoswater.org

Lagos Water Corporation formerly Federal Water Supply is the principal supplier of water throughout Lagos State. It is owned by the Lagos State Government.

The Waterworks was commissioned by Mr. Frederick Lugard, the then Governor General of Nigeria, in 1915 at Obun Eko Area of Lagos. The Lagos Water Corporation then under the federal government was established with the construction of Iju Water Works.

The Iju treatment plant had an initial design capacity of 2.45 million gallon per day (MGD) and was constructed primarily to supply Water to the Colonial residents of Ikoyi in those days.

The Lagos Water Corporation has developed a Lagos Water Supply Master Plan as a "Road Map" to take the State's water production capacity to 745 million gallons per day by 2020 in a renewed effort to solve the problem of water shortage and ensure steady supply for the growing population of Lagos.

The entire installed water production capacity is currently 210 million gallons per day (MGD), which is insufficient to meet current demand.

== Iju Waterworks ==
Iju Waterworks is a facility in Ifako-Ijaiye, LGA, Lagos Mainland that is designed to provide drinkable water to Lagos State residents. The idea of piped water for colonial and Lagos residents emerged from medical advice noting the poor quality of water sourced from water-bodies adjoining colonial Lagos and wells used by residents. Experimental wells dug in Lagos Mainland had proved to be of higher quality that those in the Island. The Iju scheme was conceived to supply better quality water to old Lagos which at the time primarily meant Lagos Island, Ikoyi and its immediate environs such as Iddo, Apapa, and Ebute Metta. To commence the scheme colonial authorities acquired 151 acres of land at Iju on Aworiland from the Egba United Government on a lease for 999 years. The site was situated at the confluence of the Iju and Adiyan rivers. Construction started in 1910, commissioning occurred on July 1, 1915, and supply of water began in August 1915. The total cost of Iju Waterworks was estimated at just over £300,000.

The initial capacity of the waterworks was close to 2.5 million gallons per day. It had three engines pumping 5,000 gallons of water per minute. After completion about 200 water fountains and 250 water hydrants were established all over Lagos. Water was distributed to colonial Lagos through a cast iron trunks mains pipeline with a 28-inch diameter. The initial beneficiaries were European residents of Ikoyi and then Lagos Island but gradually pipe water reached others areas including Ijora, Apapa, Iddo, and Ebute Metta. The distribution capacity was increased in 1943 with the addition of a second pipeline. Prior to 1954, the source of water for the scheme was from the Iju and Adiyan streams. Further increase in capacity occurred in 1954 to serve Ikorodu rd, Ikeja and Eastern Lagos and abstraction of water was extended to the Ogun River. In the years 1962, 1965, 1973 and 1985 capacity was further increased. In 1985, capacity had reached 45 million gallons per day. After the creation of Lagos State in 1967, the responsibility of Iju Waterworks was transferred to the state.

Water supply from Iju is dependent on power supply and incessant power outages affects the productivity of the plant. In 2010, the state government commissioned an independent power plant to supply electricity to the facility.

== ReCommissioning ==
Lagos state water cooperation Recommissioned a waterwork in Baruwa community in Lagos.
