= Ajibola =

Ajíbọ́lá
- Gender: Male
- Language: Yoruba

Origin
- Origin: Nigerian
- Meaning: One who wakes up to meet honour/nobility/wealth.
- Region of origin: Southwestern Nigeria

Ajíbọ́lá is a Nigerian given name and a surname. It is a male name and of Yoruba origin, which means "One who wakes up to meet honour/nobility/wealth." The diminutive form is Jíbọ́lá in a shorter form.

== Notable individuals with the name ==
- Bola Ajibola (1934–2023), Nigerian judge.
- Olanrewaju Ajibola (born 1975), Nigerian chess player.
- Samuel Ajibola, Nigerian actor and model.
- Ajibola Abitoye (born 1982) Nigerian-Canadian Politician.
- Simon Ajibola, Nigerian politician.
- Ajibola Ponnle (born 1973), Nigerian politician.
- Ajibola Basiru (born 1972), Nigerian lawyer and politician.
- Ajibola Adeoye, Nigerian paralympic athlete.
- Amoo Ajibola Joshua, a Nigerian freelance web designer, developer, and digital marketer specializing in creating interactive and user-friendly websites.
- Aji Alese (born 2001) Nigerian English professional footballer.
