= Lagos State Ministry of Commerce and Industry =

Ministry in Nigeria

Lagos State Ministry of Commerce, Cooperatives, Trade and Investment

Ministry overview
- Jurisdiction: Government of Lagos State
- Headquarters: State Government Secretariat, Alausa, Lagos State, Nigeria
- Annual budget: $ 3 Million Dollars
- Ministry executives: Hon. Folashade Bada Ambrose - Medebem, Commissioner for Commerce, Cooperatives, Trade and Investment; Mr. Babatunde Thanni Onigbanjo, Permanent Secretary for Commerce, Cooperatives, Trade and Investment; Mr. Adeniyi Oladipupo, Director, Administration and Human Resources, Lagos State Ministry for Commerce, Cooperatives, Trade and Investment
- Child agencies: Lagos State Cooperatives College; Lagos State Small Scale Industries; LEKKI WORLDWIDE INVESTMENT LIMITED.; LAGOS STATE CONSUMER PROTECTION AGENCY.
- Website: mccti.lagosstate.gov.ng

The Lagos State Ministry of Commerce Cooperatives, Trade and Investment, formerly the Lagos State Ministry of Commerce and Industry, is the state government ministry, charged with the responsibility to plan, devise and implement the state policies on commerce, cooperatives, trade and investment. This ministry was established to ensure business Prosperity and Consumer Satisfaction in Lagos state. The head office of the agency is located at Block 8, The Secretariat, Obafemi Awolowo Way, Alausa, Ikeja, Lagos state.

== Activities ==
- Lagos State Ministry of Commerce, Industry and Cooperatives registered 247 new cooperatives and revalidated 2359mcooperatives societies
- The ministry through the Lagos State Cooperative College is accredited has organized various human capacity-building programmes for over 4000 cooperators in Lagos state.

== See also ==
- Lagos State Ministry of Science and Technology
- Lagos State Executive Council
