= Lagos State Infrastructure Maintenance and Regulatory Agency =

Nigerian state agency

- Formation: 2004
- Purpose: Regulate Utility Infrastructure in Lagos State
- Headquarters: 2 Yusuf Close, Off Bayo Ajayi Street Agidingbi, Phase 2 Ikeja.
- General Manager/Chief Executive Officer: Bisoye Coker-Odusote
- Website: www.lasimra.gov.ng

The Lagos State Infrastructure Maintenance and Regulatory Agency (LASIMRA) is responsible for regulating utility infrastructure in Lagos state. The goal of the agency is to ensure that standards and effectiveness are maintained in infrastructural development. The agency is a parastatal established by the "Lagos State government law NO 13 of July and published in the official gazette NO 23 volume 37 of 27th August, 2004", under the supervision of the Lagos State Ministry of Works and Infrastructure. LASIMRA was established by the then Governor Asiwaju Bola Ahmed Tinubu. The head office of the agency is located at 2 Yusuf Close, Off Bayo Ajayi Street Agidingbi, Ikeja, Lagos state.

== Companies ==
LASIMRA regulates utility infrastructure development of the following sectors/companies in Lagos State. They are:

- Oil and gas companies
- Telecommunication companies
- Electricity companies.

== Activities ==
- The agency executed the smart-city initiative for the laying of 3,000 km (1,900 mi) of fiber optic cables in the Lagos State Unified Duct Infrastructure Project (LASG-UDIP) to ensure citywide Internet connection.
- LASIMRA removed abandoned and substandard telecommunication masts across Lagos state.
- The agency began audit of infrastructures(power, telecommunications, gas and water cables and pipes) both under and over the ground, with the aim of creating a database of information system
- The agency moved against indiscriminate installation of telecommunication cables in gutters and trees across the state to ensure environmental safety for the residents of the state

== See also ==
- Lagos State Ministry of Works and Infrastructure
