= Olugbenga Oyerinde =

Nigerian politician

Hon. Olugbenga Oyerinde

Commissioner for Special Duties and Intergovernmental Relations
- Incumbent
- Assumed office 2023
- Governor: Babajide Sanwo‑Olu

Special Adviser on Central Business District
- In office 2019–2023
- Governor: Babajide Sanwo‑Olu

Personal details
- Born: Olugbenga Oyerinde; 10 September 1969 (age 57) Ebute‑Meta, Lagos State, Nigeria
- Citizenship: Nigerian
- Party: All Progressives Congress
- Other political affiliations: Alliance for Democracy
- Education: Federal Polytechnic, Bida; Yaba College of Technology; University of Lagos
- Occupation: Politician, human resource practitioner
- Profession: Human resource manager, public administrator

Olugbenga Oyerinde is a Nigerian human resource practitioner and politician who serves as the Commissioner for Special Duties and Intergovernmental Relations in Lagos State, Nigeria.

== Early life and education ==
Olugbenga Oyerinde was born on 10 September 1969 on Herbert Macaulay Street, Ebute Metta. He attended Agunjayi Primary School in Lagos and later Salawa Abiola Comprehensive High School in Abeokuta for his secondary education. He obtained an OND in Mathematics and Statistics from Federal Polytechnic, Bida, followed by an HND in the same discipline from Yaba College of Technology, Lagos. After completing his studies, he participated in the one‑year National Youth Service Corps (NYSC) programme. He later undertook postgraduate studies in Business Administration at the University of Lagos and subsequently earned a Master’s degree (MSc) in Industrial and Labour Relations.

== Career ==
Oyerinde began his professional career as a management trainee with United Distillers and Vitners on Idiroko Road in Ogun State. He later held roles as a divisional manager for the Mid‑Western region and oversaw market operations in Benin.

He later served at the Artee Group as Admin and Personnel Manager and subsequently as Group Admin and Human Resource Manager, spending eight years with the organisation. He then joined the European Soaps and Detergent Group, where he was Head of Admin and Human Resources for two years.

=== Political career ===
Oyerinde entered partisan politics in 2003 when he joined the Alliance for Democracy.

In 2019, he was appointed Special Adviser to Governor Babajide Sanwo‑Olu on the Central Business District (CBD).

He was appointed Commissioner for Special Duties and Intergovernmental Relations in Lagos State in 2023.
