= Oladimeji Oresanya =

Nigerian geologist and politician

Hon. Oladimeji Oresanya

Commissioner for Environment of Ogun State
- Incumbent
- Assumed office 2023
- Governor: Dapo Abiodun

Personal details
- Born: Ogun State, Nigeria
- Education: University of Ibadan, Obafemi Awolowo University, Harvard Kennedy School
- Occupation: Geologist, politician

Oladimeji Oresanya is a Nigerian geologist, environmental management specialist, and politician. Since 2023, he has been Commissioner for Environment in Ogun State.

== Education ==
Oresanya earned a bachelor's degree (B.Sc.) in Geology from the University of Ibadan and later obtained a master's degree (M.Sc.) in Environmental Management and Ecology from Obafemi Awolowo University, Ile‑Ife. He also attended the Harvard Kennedy School at Harvard University, Massachusetts, United States.

== Career ==
In the private sector, he co‑founded Globetech Remedial Limited, where he is Chief Executive Officer. He also teaches courses on Waste Management and Toxicology at the Federal University of Agriculture, Abeokuta.

From May 2005 to August 2015, Oresanya was Managing Director and Chief Executive Officer of the Lagos Waste Management Authority (LAWMA). He has also worked as a consultant to UN‑Habitat/UNEP and advised federal and state governments in Nigeria on waste management. In Ogun State, he previously was Special Adviser to the Governor.

In 2023, Governor Dapo Abiodun nominated him for a commissioner role. He was subsequently confirmed and appointed Commissioner for Environment.
