= Lagos State Scholarship Board =

Board overview
- Formed: February 1968
- Jurisdiction: Lagos State Government
- Headquarters: 254 Ipaja Rd, Agege, Lagos
- Board executive: Mrs. Rasheedat Daranijo, Executive Secretary
- Website: lagosscholarship.org

The Lagos State Scholarship Board is a governmental body that oversees and manages matters relating to scholarship, education, and bursary in Lagos State. Established in February 1968 by the Lagos State Government, the body aims at providing “educational assistance to deserving students for the development of Lagos State”.

== Awardees selection ==
Bursary and scholarship awards are only allocated to selected students in basic, secondary and tertiary institutions based on the recommendation from a selected panel of members from the five divisions of the state. Applicants for any of these awards must be Lagos State indigenes.

== Departments ==
The Lagos State Scholarship Board consists of nine departments headed under the Office of the Special Adviser on Education. They include:

- Board Secretary
- Bursary
- Foreign Scholarship
- Local Scholarship
- Administration/Personnel
- Accounts
- Press & Public Relations
- Planning, Statistics & Budget
- Procurement.

== See also ==
- Lagos State Government
