= Uzamat Akinbile Yussuf =

Commissioner of Ministry for Tourism, Lagos State

Lagos State Ministry of Tourism
- Incumbent
- Assumed office 2019
- Governor: Babajide Sanwo-Olu

Personal details
- Education: University of Lagos

Uzamat Akinbile Yussuf also known as Uzamat Folashayo Akinbile Yussuf (born 1976), is a pharmacist, youth activist, a politician and philanthropist. She is the current commissioner for Ministry of Tourism Lagos State, her portfolios was changed from Lagos State, Ministry of Home Affairs to Ministry of Tourism, Arts and Culture, Lagos State.

== Education ==
She attend Ansar-ud-deen Primary School, Ile ife around the year 1980 to 1986. Later on, she gained admission into the Seventh Day Adventist Grammar school, Ile Ife between 1987 and 1992. She got admitted into University of Lagos, where she graduated in 2006 with a B. Pharmacy degree. She then became a Doctor of Social Work (DSW) from the Institute of Social Work of Nigeria. Uzamat is a member of Association of Ladies Pharmacists Society (ALPS), National Association of Social Workers of Nigeria (NASOW) and Pharmacists Society of Nigeria. She published a book called Duty Calls.

== Career ==
Uzamat was a former aspirant Lagos State House of Assembly, Alimosho Constituency 1 2010–2011. She served as Supervisory Councillor, Agriculture, Rural and Social Development in Agbado/Oke-Odo between 2012 and 2014. She also served as the State Executive Council as Honourable Commissioner for Youth and Social Development, Lagos from 2015 – 17, and then Wealth Creation and Employment from 2018 – 19. In 2019, Uzamat was appointed the Honourable Commissioner for Home Affairs by Governor Sanwo-Olu until her redeployment to the Lagos State Ministry of Tourism (which was created to showcase the rich heritage, diverse lifestyle and entertainment to promote Lagos mega city as a destination of choice) in January 2020 where she's currently serving.

Uzamata is a successful business woman owning a number of firms as a managing director including Musaroq Nig. Ltd, Beta Silver Crown Ltd, Musaroq Pharmaceuticals among others. She is also a philanthropist and has funded a number of community development services in her community.

== Personal life ==
She is married with children.

== See also ==
- List of government ministries of Lagos State
