= Folashade Adefisayo =

Commissioner of Education, Lagos State, Nigeria

Lagos State Ministry of Education
- Incumbent
- Assumed office 2019
- Governor: Babajide Sanwo-Olu

Personal details
- Education: University of Ibadan; Lagos State University; University of Nottingham

Folashade Adefisayo is a Nigerian academic and a teacher, she was a former commissioner of Lagos State Ministry of Education.

== Education ==
She attended the University of Ibadan where she received a bachelor's degree in Zoology. Later, she moved to Lagos State University where she obtained Master's Degree in Business Administration and to the University of Nottingham, where she obtained another master's degree in education.

== Career ==
Folashade set a programme to improve students in Computer Based Test (CBT), after a long lockdown of COVID-19 in Lagos State, the programme is set to improve about 1.5 million students across Lagos State and Nigeria. She also ordered promotion of students of Lagos to next class by considering their continue assessment (CA Test). Prior to becoming a commissioner in Lagos State, Folashade worked in the Banking and education sector. Folashade has a forty years job experience altogether.

== Personal life ==
Folashade was born and raised in Lagos and Ibadan, Nigeria; she is the eldest daughter among five members of her family, and she likes reading and travelling.

== See also ==
- Executive Council of Lagos State
