= Solomon Bonu =

Nigerian politician and state legislator

Solomon Saanu Bonu (born 16 June 1972) is a Nigerian politician and the Lagos State House of Assembly Member representing Badagry Constituency 1. He was the immediate past Special Adviser to the Governor of Lagos State on Tourism, Arts, and Culture.

== Work ==
In August 2019, Bonu was appointed and sworn in as a Special Adviser to the Lagos State Governor on Tourism, Arts and Culture. He resigned the position in May 2022 in order to contest in the 2023 Nigerian General Elections. On March 19, 2023, Bonu was returned as the winner of the House of Assembly Election held for Badagry Constituency 1.
