= Abisola Olusanya =

Nigerian architect and businessperson

Abisola Ruth Olusanya is a Nigerian architect and businessperson with interests in agricultural supply chains. She has served as the Commissioner for Agriculture and Food Systems in Lagos State since 2020.

== Early life and education ==
Olusanya was born in the Ikorodu area of Lagos State into a polygamous family of eight children.

She attended St. Margaret Nursery & Primary School, Ikorodu, Lagos State, for her primary education. She proceeded to Queens College, Yaba, Lagos, for her secondary education. She studied Architecture at the University of Lagos, where she earned a Bachelor’s degree between 2001 and 2006. She later obtained an MBA in General Management from Lagos Business School in 2011.

== Career ==
Olusanya began her professional career as a sales manager at Olam International in 2011.

She was appointed Special Adviser to the Lagos State Governor on Agriculture in August 2019.

In 2020, she was appointed Commissioner for Agriculture and Food Systems, Lagos State, by Governor Babajide Sanwo-Olu.
