= Olanrewaju Ibrahim Layode =

Nigerian politician

Hon. Olanrewaju Ibrahim Layode

Commissioner for Home Affairs, Lagos State
- Incumbent
- Assumed office 2023
- Governor: Babajide Sanwo-Olu

Member, Lagos State House of Assembly
- In office 2007–2023
- Constituency: Badagry constituency I

Personal details
- Born: 10 November 1973 (age 52) Lagos State, Nigeria
- Party: All Progressives Congress
- Education: Lagos State University
- Occupation: Politician

Olanrewaju Ibrahim Layode is a Nigerian politician who serves as the Commissioner for Home Affairs in Lagos State.

== Early life and education ==
Layode was born on 10 November 1973. He obtained a National Certificate of Education (NCE) before earning a Bachelor of Arts degree from Lagos State University. He later completed a master's programme in Public Administration.

== Career ==
Layode began his political career in 2007 when he was elected to the Lagos State House of Assembly representing Badagry Constituency 1. He served four consecutive terms, remaining in the Assembly until 2023.

In mid 2023, he was appointed Commissioner for Home Affairs by Governor Babajide Sanwo-Olu. His responsibilities include oversight of state programmes related to interfaith engagement and religious administration.

== Personal life ==
Layode is married to Princess Elizabeth Adefunke Akran‑Layode, daughter of the Akran of Badagry. Both are graduates of Lagos State University.
