= Gbenga Omotoso =

Nigerian politician and journalist (born 1961)

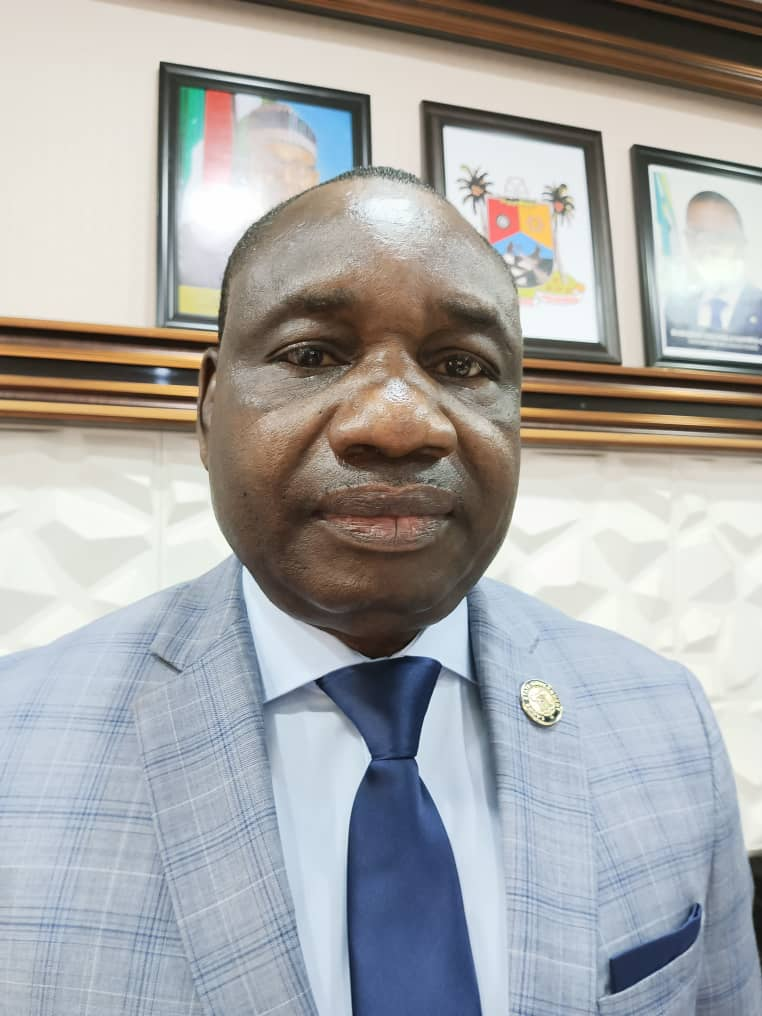
- Born: November 11, 1961 (age 64)
- Occupations: Journalist, writer, columnist and commissioner for information and strategy
- Organization(s): Lagos State Ministry of Information and Strategy

Gbenga Omotoso (born November 11, 1961) is a journalist, writer and columnist. He was the editor at The Nation newspaper until he was appointed as the Commissioner in charge of the Lagos State Ministry of Information and Strategy. He was sworn in 2019 by the Lagos State Governor, Babajide Sanwo-Olu. His tenure ended in 2023 after the first term of Mr Babajide Sanwo-olu. He was re-appointed as the commissioner for information and strategy and sworn in 2023 by the governor

== Early life ==
Omotoso was born on November 11, 1961. He is from Osun State, South West, Nigeria. He graduated from the University of Benin in 1984 where he received his B.A. in English and Literature. He proceeded with a Masters in Public and International Affairs at the University of Lagos, Akoka, which he completed in 2007.

== Career ==
Omotoso has spent 35 years in the media. He started as a trainee sub-editor at The Guardian newspaper. He later became the deputy editor of Guardian Express from where he rose to become the Editor of the Saturday Guardian. In 1999, at the inception of the Comet newspaper, he was appointed the pioneer editor of the newspaper.

In 2006 he again became the pioneer editor of The Nation newspaper. He has maintained a column "Editorial Notebook" in The Nation, where he writes on topical issues using humor to present serious issues. He is a member of Nigeria Guild of Editors (NGE) and member of Nigeria Union of Journalists (NUJ).

He loved sports, particularly table tennis. He showed his skills in an exhibition against a professional table tennis player, Aruna Quadri.

== Awards ==
Omotoso has received many awards for excellence in media practice. The awards include the DAME Award in 2010, Nigeria Media Merit Award Editor of the Year in 2013, Nigeria Media Merit Award Editor of the Year in 2015, and Nigeria Media Merit Award Editor of the Year in 2017.
