= Lagos State Ministry of Transport =

Development of Transport Infrastructure and Integrated Multi-modal Transportation

Ministry overview
- Formed: 1984
- Jurisdiction: Government of Lagos State
- Headquarters: State Government Secretariat, Alausa, Lagos State, Nigeria
- Ministry executive: Dr. Frederic Oladeinde, Commissioner
- Website: https://transportation.lagosstate.gov.ng/

The Lagos State Ministry of Transport is the government ministry responsible for transportation in Lagos State, Nigeria. In 1984, under the administration of Governor Gbolahan Mudasiru, the Ministry of Transportation was merged with the Ministry of Works and became the Ministry of Works and Transport. The ministry was set up for two main objectives:

- To set up a centralized transit system within the metropolis.
- To tackle the problems of transportation in the state.

== History ==
Before 1979, there existed only a Transportation Unit in the planning division of the old Ministry of Works and Planning. Under the administration of Late Alhaji Lateef Jakande, the growth of traffic in the metropolis posed logistic challenges that could no longer be served by a sub-stratum of the Ministry and that led to the creation of the Ministry of Transportation in Lagos State. The Ministry of Transportation was merged with the Ministry of Works and became the Ministry of Works and Transport in 1984, under the administration of Governor Gbolahan Mudasiru.

It was Ministry of Works and Transport until around 1994 when it was separated and named Ministry of Public Transportation under Oyinlola's administration. The inception of the administration of Asiwaju Bola Ahmed Tinubu made the name of the Ministry changed to Ministry of Transportation and since then, the Ministry began to reflect the contemporary realities and the vision of the present administration as regards bequeathing Lagosians with an efficient and effective transport system.

== See also ==
- Lagos State Ministry of Education
- Lagos State Ministry of Housing
- Lagos State Executive Council

== Vision ==
To have a Safe, Reliable, Effective and Efficient Integrated Multi-modal Transportation System that is sustainable for Socio-economic benefit of Lagosians.

== Mission ==
Development of Transport Infrastructure and Integrated Multi-modal Transportation Administration with the aim of achieving safety of lives and properties, Free flow of traffic and sectoral support for investment growth across Lagos State.
