= Wale Ahmed =

Nigerian politician (born 1965)

Lagos State Commissioner for Special Duties
- In office 2020–present

Personal details
- Born: 3 May 1965 (age 61)
- Party: All Progressives Congress
- Profession: Politician

Wale Ahmed (born 3 May 1965) is a Nigerian politician who is a Senator from Lagos State. He currently serves as the Comisissioner for Special Duties to Lagos State Government.

== Early life and education ==
Wale was born in Agege on 3 May 1965 and attended Anwar-Ul-Islam College Agege, 1977-1982, Usman Dan Fodio University, Sokoto, 1985-1991 and the University of Lagos, 2000-2002.

== Career ==
Ahmed was a member Lagos State Publicity Committee of the Action Congress of Nigeria for the April 2011 General Elections and subsequently served as the Hon. Commissioner for Special Duties between 2011 and 2015.

Ahmed had a Bachelor of Medicine, Bachelor of Surgery (MB, BS) in 1991, Masters in International Law and Diplomacy (MILD) in 2000 and Masters in Humanitarian and Refugee Studies (MHRS) in 2002. Until his appointment by Governor Sanwo-Olu as the Honourable Commissioner Commissioner for Special Duties, he was the State Secretary, All Progressives Congress (APC) in Lagos State.

In January, 2020, Ahmed was redeployed to the Ministry of Local Government and Community Affairs as the Honorable Commissioner where he is currently serving.
