= Bolaji Dada =

Nigerian politician

Hon Bolaji Dada

Lagos State Commissioner for Women Affairs and Poverty Alleviation
- Incumbent
- Assumed office 2019
- Preceded by: Joke Orelope- Adefulire

Personal details
- Born: Cecelia Bolaji Dada; 9 July 1966 (age 60) Apapa
- Party: All Progressives Congress
- Education: Lagos State University (BSc); Leeds Metropolitan University, (MSc)

Cecelia Bolaji Dada (born 7 July 1966) was a former vice-chairman of Apapa Local Government and current commissioner for Women Affairs and Poverty Alleviation in Lagos state.

== Early life and education ==
Dada was born in Lagos and received B.Sc (Hon.) in industrial chemistry from the Lagos State University in 1991 and further obtained a master of science degree in corporate governance from Leeds Metropolitan University in 2009.

== Political career ==
Dada's foray into administration began when she was appointed as a member of the Lagos State Sports Commission and then later became the Executive Secretary and 2-time Vice-chairman of Apapa Local Government where she received an award as the 2010 best Vice-Chairman in Lagos.

Dada was later appointed by Governor Sanwaolu to serve as the Commissioner for Women Affairs and Poverty Alleviation in 2020.

== Personal life ==
Dada is married with children.
