= Adetokunbo Wahab =

Nigerian lawyer and politician

Adetokunbo Philip Wahab

Commissioner for the Environment and Water Resources
- Incumbent
- Assumed office September 2023

Special Adviser on Education to the Lagos State Governor
- In office August 2019 – May 2023

Personal details
- Born: 17 May 1972 (age 54) Lagos State, Nigeria
- Occupation: Lawyer and Politician

Adetokunbo Philip Wahab (born 17 May 1972) is a Nigerian lawyer and politician. He currently serves as the Commissioner for Environment and Water Resources in Lagos State. He has also served as the Special Adviser on Education to the Governor of Lagos State, Nigeria.

== Early life ==
Adetokunbo Philip Wahab was born on 17 May 1972 in Lagos State, Nigeria.

== Education ==
Wahab attended the then Ogun State Polytechnic (now Moshood Abiola Polytechnic) where he earned a National Diploma in Mass Communication in 1993. He graduated from the University of Benin in 1998 with a Bachelor of Law (LLB). In 2000, he proceeded to the Nigerian Law School. He is also an alumnus of Harvard Kennedy School, Harvard Business School, and the Wharton School, University of Pennsylvania.

== Political life and career ==
Wahab began his career as a lawyer at Jiti Ogunye & Co. Associates (2000–2003) before joining Paul Usoro and Co. as Senior Counsel (2003–2005). He later worked as a Senior Associate at Aluko & Oyebode (2005–2009). He founded Wall & Ace Legal Practitioners in 2009 https://www.linkedin.com/company/wall-ace-lp/about/, where he served as Managing Partner until 2019. Wahab is a member of the Nigerian Bar Association (NBA) and the International Bar Association (IBA). Wahab has served in various political offices, he is the serving Commissioner for Environment and Water Resources in Lagos State and Special Adviser on Education to the Lagos State Governor.
