= Jamiu Alli-Balogun =

Nigerian politician and administrator

Jamiu Tolani Alli-Balogun

Commissioner for Basic and Secondary Education
- Incumbent
- Assumed office 13 September 2023
- Governor: Babajide Sanwo-Olu

Personal details
- Born: Lagos State, Nigeria
- Occupation: Politician, Administrator

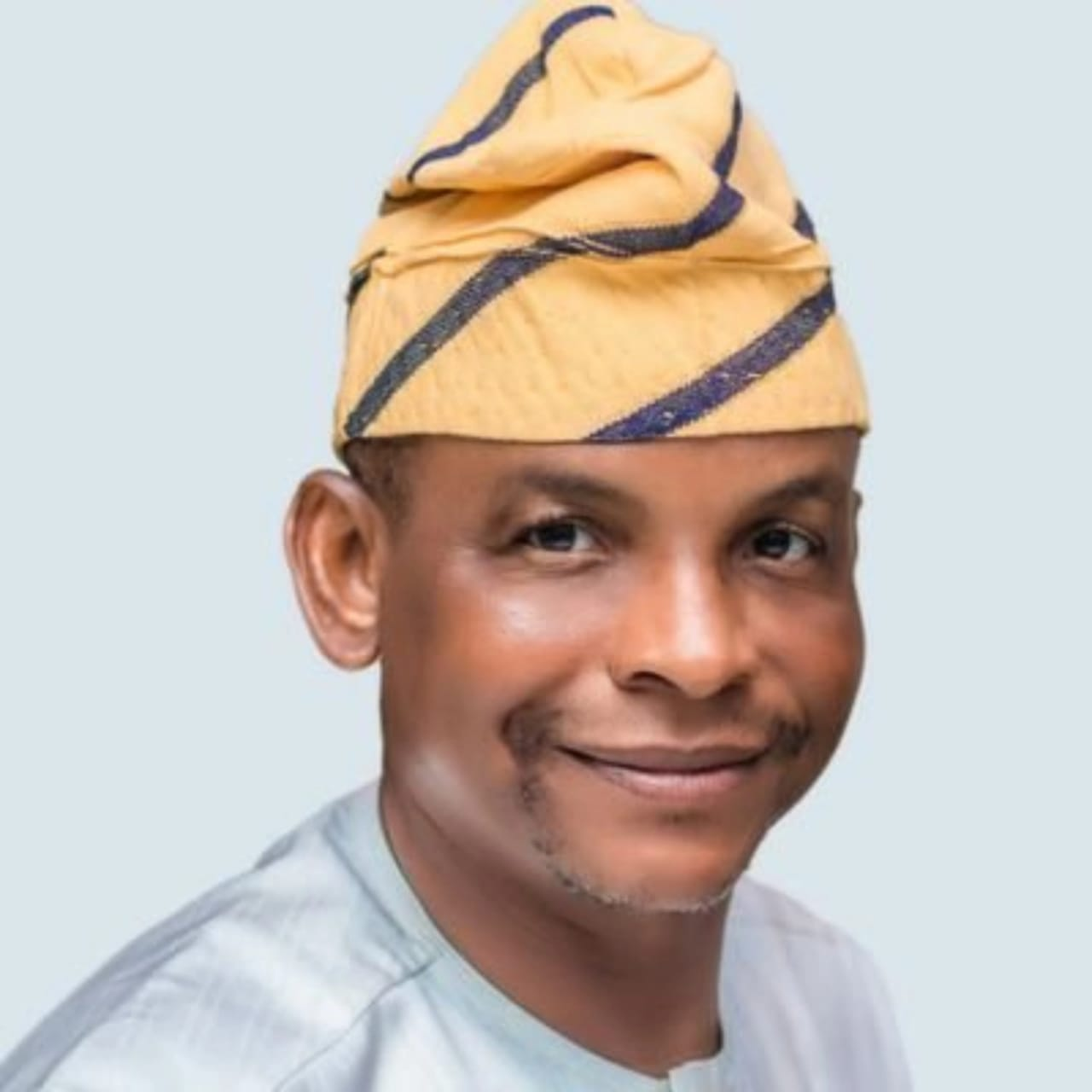
Portrait of Jamie Ali-Balogun

Jamiu Tolani Alli-Balogun is a Nigerian politician, educationist, and public administrator currently serving as the Commissioner for Basic and Secondary Education in Lagos State.

== Career ==
Alli-Balogun was sworn into the office of the Commissioner for Basic and Secondary Education, Lagos State, on September 13, 2023 by Governor Babajide Sanwo-Olu. He is a member of the Governing Council of the Teachers Registration Council of Nigeria (TRCN) having been appointed in July 2024.

He is also a Fellow of the Association of Professional Counsellors in Nigeria (APCI).
