= Akin Abayomi =

Nigerian politician

- Other name: Emmanuel
- Citizenship: Nigerian
- Title: Professor
- Awards: National Productivity Order of Merit (NPOM)

Akin Emmanuel Abayomi is a Nigerian professor who specializes in internal medicine, haematology, environmental health, Biosecurity and biobanking. Abayomi currently serves as Lagos State commissioner for health. He was with the Nigerian Institute of Medical Research in Lagos when he was appointed Commissioner by Governor Babajide Sanwo-Olu in 2019. Following the reported index case of COVID-19 in Lagos in March 2020, Abayomi was appointed to lead the response against the virus in the Africa's largest commercial city. On 24 August 2020, he tested positive for COVID-19 and recovered on 31 August 2020.

== Appointment ==
He was appointed as the Lagos state commissioner for health in 2019 by governor Babajide Sanwolu of Lagos.He previously head a position as the chief pathologist and head of the Division of Haematology at the University of Stellenbosch’s Faculty of Medicine Sciences.

== Award of Honor ==
President Muhammad Buhari conferred on Professor Akin Abayomi the award of National Productivity Order of Merit (NPOM) in recognition of his hard work and excellence, particularly in the fight against COVID-19 in Lagos State.
