= Folashade Ambrose-Medebem =

Nigerian politician and businessperson

Folashade Ambrose-Medebem is a Nigerian businessperson and politician, and currently serves as Commissioner for Commerce, Cooperatives, Trade & Investment in Lagos State, Nigeria.

== Education ==
Folashade Ambrose-Medebem attended London Guildhall University, where she graduated with a B.A. (Hons) in Accounting & Finance(1995). She also has a Master's of Business Administration (MBA) from the Open University Business School, United Kingdom in 2011.

She is a certified Financial Management consultant with the Chartered Insurance Institute (CII), UK, the Advanced Management Leadership Programme, of the Lagos Business School, Pan‑Africa University.

== Career ==
She has served in board membership roles on the UN Sustainable Development Goals (SDGs) Private Sector Advisory Group (PSAG) Nigeria, and other United Nations programs. In 2016, she was appointed Director of Communications, Public Affairs & Sustainable Development, Lafarge Africa Plc.

In September 2023, she got a political appointment as the Commissioner for Commerce, Cooperatives, Trade & Investment, Lagos State by the governor of Lagos State, Babajide Sanwo-Olu.
