= Lagos State Ministry of Education =

Ministry in Lagos State, Nigeria

Ministry overview
- Jurisdiction: Government of Lagos State
- Headquarters: State Government Secretariat Alausa, Lagos State, Nigeria
- Ministry executive: [Jamiu Alli-Balogun]], Commissioner
- Website: https://education.lagosstate.gov.ng/

The Lagos State Ministry of Education oversees the development and implementation of educational policies and programs in Lagos State, Nigeria. The Ministry is responsible for managing public education, formulating curricula, and ensuring the quality of education across the state's Educational institutions.

Jamiu Alli-Balogun is currently serving as the Commissioner for Education in the Lagos State.

== Riggs & confetti London award of excellence for Lagos students ==
120 Students all over the six education districts in Lagos State received brand new laptops in late November 2024 in ikeja Lagos State as a recognition of their academic performance some of the students includes Samuel efereyan of ayangburen senior high school ikorodu and abdulsalam Bada of oriwu senior model college ikorodu including students from Government senior model college ikorodu elepe community senior grammar school amongst others.

== See also ==
- Lagos State Ministry of Transport
- Lagos State Executive Council
- Lagos State Ministry of Housing
