= Biodun Ogunleye =

Nigerian politician

Biodun Ogunleye is a Nigerian banker and politician who has served as the Commissioner for Energy and Mineral Resources in Lagos State since 2023.

== Career ==
Biodun Ogunleye worked for about twenty years in the banking, finance, and energy sectors.

He previously was Chief Executive Officer of PowerCap Ltd, an energy‑focused company, and a member of the board of Emmanuella Consulting Services Ltd.

In 2023, Ogunleye was appointed Commissioner for Energy and Mineral Resources in Lagos State, succeeding Olalere Odusote, who previously held the position. In this role, he has outlined the Lagos State government's policy direction on energy development.
