= Ajibola Ponnle =

Commissioner for Lagos State, Establishments, Training and Pensions

Lagos State Ministry of Establishments, Training and Pensions
- Incumbent
- Assumed office 2019
- Governor: Babajide Sanwo-Olu

Personal details
- Born: 9 September 1973 (age 53) Nigeria
- Education: University of Ibadan; University of London

Ajibola Ponnle (born 9 September 1973) is a Nigerian public and private sector leadership expert, an executive consciousness coach and social impact entrepreneur. She is the founder and CEO of HIG Africa (Human Investment Group Africa), a human capital and social impact organization focused on youth development, economic empowerment, and human capital transformation across Nigeria and Africa. She served as the Commissioner for Establishments, Training and Pensions in Lagos State from 2019 to 2023.

== Early life and education ==
Ponnle was born on 9 September 1973 in Nigeria. She earned a B.Sc. in Economics from the University of Ibadan, and an M.Sc. in Organisational Psychology from the University of London. In 2023, she completed a Diploma in Public Leadership from the Harvard Kennedy School.

== Career ==
=== Early career ===
Ponnle began her professional career in 1994 at Arthur Andersen (now KPMG). She later joined British American Tobacco, where she held senior roles in finance and marketing. In 2004, she founded Teambuilding Africa Consultancy, and later TBA Consults, delivering leadership and team development services across the private and public sectors.

=== Public service ===
Ponnle was appointed as Lagos State Commissioner for Establishments, Training and Pensions in 2019 by Governor Babajide Sanwo-Olu. During her tenure, she implemented wide-ranging reforms, including:

==== Human capital development ====
- Increased annual physical training programs from 1,000 to over 4,000.
- Onboarded over 40,000 public servants onto a customized digital learning platform, with access to more than 10,000 courses.
- Launched the Lateef Jakande Leadership Academy, Nigeria’s first government-led youth fellowship.
- Developed a Learning and Development Policy and a competency framework for over 20 Ministries, Departments, and Agencies (MDAs).

==== Pension reforms ====
- Introduced Nigeria’s first online pensioner verification system.
- Facilitated the clearance of over ₦50.7 billion in accrued pension rights for nearly 14,000 retirees.
- Increased employer and employee contribution rates in line with pension reform laws.
- Introduced biometric identity cards for pensioners to access social welfare benefits.

==== Industrial relations and governance ====
- Maintained industrial harmony during nationwide labor unrest.
- Led successful negotiations with health, education, and civil service unions on wages and benefits.
- Digitalized human resources operations including circulars, KPI tracking, and budgeting tools.
- Co-chaired the Lagos Economic Summit (Ehingbeti) and contributed to the state’s Medium-Term Development Plan.

== HIG Africa ==
After her public service tenure, Ponnle founded HIG Africa, a platform focused on addressing youth unemployment, economic inclusion, and digital transformation. Under her leadership, HIG Africa has:

- Developed Learn-to-Earn programs in vocational, tech, and entrepreneurial skills.
- Partnered with traditional and government institutions to launch community-based programs.
- Promoted youth-centered policy advocacy.
- Built pipelines connecting trained youth to employment and enterprise opportunities across Nigeria.

== Other roles ==
- Registrar/CEO, Chartered Institute of Personnel Management (2017–2019)
- Founding Board Member, Africa Executive Coaching Council (formerly FS-ECAB)
- Founder, Centre for CoRe Coaching – established the first ICF-accredited indigenous coach training program in West Africa
- Adjunct Lecturer, Lagos Business School
- Leadership consultant and facilitator for MTN, First Bank, Mobil, Total Energies, Etisalat, KPMG, and others

== Personal life ==
Ajibola Ponnle has 3 boys loves travelling, good food and wine experiences.

== See also ==
- Youth empowerment in Africa
- Lagos State Government
- Organizational psychology
- Public sector reform
- Women in Nigerian politics
