= Lagos State Ministry of Finance =

Ministry of the Lagos State Government, Nigeria

Ministry overview
- Jurisdiction: Government of Lagos State
- Headquarters: State Government Secretariat, Alausa, Lagos State, Nigeria
- Ministry executive: Mr. Rabiu Olowo Onaolapo, Commissioner
- Website: https://finance.lagosstate.gov.ng/

The Lagos State Ministry of Finance is a ministry of the Government of Lagos State, Nigeria, with responsibility for planning and implementing the state's financial policies.

== History ==
The Ministry of Finance and Economic Development was established in April 1968. Economic Development was separated from the Ministry of Finance in 1995, and the Ministry of Economic Planning and Budget was formed.

The Finance Ministry was then divided into six directorates: Personnel Management, Planning, Research and Statistics, and Finance and Supplies, as well as three professional directorates: Public Finance, Computer Services, and Central Internal Audit.

Finance Headquarters, the State Treasury Office, and the Board of Internal Revenue were the three agencies that made up the Ministry of Finance upon its beginning.

In 2006, the Board of Internal Revenue, which is charged with collecting tax-related Internally Generated Revenue (IGR) for the State Government, was upgraded and given semi-autonomous status in order to improve revenue production, transparency and accountability.

In 2005, the PF/DMO, which had previously been a Ministry Department, was also elevated to the rank of Agency, with a Permanent Secretary as its head.

The PF/DMO was combined with the Office of Finance in 2015 as part of the current government's reorganization, and it continues to perform its statutory tasks. A permanent secretary leads the Office of Finance, which is one of the Ministry of Finance's arms. The Ministry's Headquarters serves as its coordinating arm.

== Vision ==
To Transform Lagos State Office of Finance into the Model Manager for Public Finance in Africa.

== Mission ==
Committed to Effective Financial Risk Management, and leveraging on Private Sector Participation towards Achieving the Needs and Aspirations of Government and People of Lagos State.

== Responsibilities ==
The ministry is in charge of developing and evaluating financial policies, monitors all income sources, coordinates all revenue consultants, is in charge of the Lagos State Mortgage Scheme, and develops plans and programs to help all revenue collecting agencies meet their goals.

== See also ==
- Lagos State Ministry of Economic Planning and Budget
- Executive Council of Lagos State
