= Lagos State Ministry of Women Affairs and Poverty Alleviation =

Lagos's Ministry

Ministry overview
- Formed: 1999
- Jurisdiction: Government of Lagos State
- Headquarters: State Government Secretariat, Alausa, Lagos State, Nigeria
- Ministry executive: Hon. Cecilia Bolaji Dada, Commissioner
- Website: https://wapa.lagosstate.gov.ng/

In 1999, the Ministry of Women's Affairs and Poverty Alleviation was established.

It has gone through several stages of evolution before becoming a Ministry.

Originally, it was the Ministry of Youths, Sports, and Social Welfare's Department of Women and Children.

Later, it was elevated to the status of a Bureau within the Governor's Office.

By Decree 42 of 1992, it was transformed into the Women Commission in 1993.

By virtue of Lagos State Official Gazette No 7, Vol. 34, dated 22 March 2001, it finally became a full-fledged Ministry.

Since then, the scope of its work has continued to broaden to include a wide range of state sectors.

The Lagos State Ministry of Women Affairs and Poverty Alleviation is the state government ministry, charged with the responsibility to plan, devise and implement the state policies on Women Affairs and Poverty Alleviation.

The Lagos State Domestic and Sexual Violence Response Team (DSVRT) has been established and is charged with rescuing and rehabilitating domestic violence victims.

The State's Guidelines Against Domestic and Sexual Violence have also been released by the State Government. It's called the Domestic Violence Protocol for Responder Agencies, and it's designed to give relevant agencies rules and set standards.

== Impact ==
- In 2017, the Ministry of Women Affairs and Poverty Alleviation, led by Hon. Commissioner of WAPA, Dr Lola Akande, held their annual WAPA Connect Conference with the theme "Fostering Domestic Harmony Through Multi Perspective Analysis & Graphic Display/Entrepreneurship in the 21st Century.
- Taking into account its cosmopolitan nature as well as its dynamic economic and commercial status, Lagos State has the largest mixtures of women in the country. At the inception of his administration in Lagos State, Governor Akinwunmi Ambode pledged to run an inclusive government in which no one or any segment will be left behind. It is in fulfillment of this sacred pledge that the State Government has intensified efforts to make sure that the right of every woman, irrespective of sex, tribe and religious affiliations is not in any way trampled upon in the State. In a bid to improve the living standard of women in the State, the State Government through the Ministry of Women Development and Poverty Alleviation (WAPA), has embarked upon a variety of empowerment programmes aimed at advancing the potentials of women to earn a decent living. The ultimate goal is to make them economically secure. Recently, over 3200 women and men including widows, vulnerable women, graduates of skill acquisition centres and senior citizens were also empowered through the State Government mega empowerment programme.
- Students in Welding Fabrication, Refrigerator/Air Conditioner Maintenance and Repair, Vulcanising/Wheel Balancing and Alignment, Catering and Hotel Management, and others, were placed on a three-month mandatory Industrial Training program with Julius Berger Plc, Eko Hotel and Suites, Kots Catering, and Lagos Airport Hotel, among others, in order to expose them to practical knowledge in relevant industries. In 2016, the Ministry's SACs graduated a total of 6,105 students. Over 6,000 students are now enrolled in a variety of training programs at various locations throughout the state.
- Cecilia Bolaji Dada, the Lagos State Commissioner for Women Affairs and Poverty Alleviation (WAPA), has condemned domestic violence against Nigerian women, stating that 664 women were abused by their husbands in Lagos alone in the last year, according to cases submitted to their office. According to her, 378 women will be abused by their spouses in 2020, while 286 women will be abused by their husbands in the first quarter of this year. Today, the Ministry of Women Affairs and Poverty Alleviation held an interactive session with returnees at the Lagos Chamber of Commerce and Industry on human trafficking, prostitution, and illegal migration.
- WAPA reiterates commitment to fostering peace, security among residents.
- The Lagos State Ministry of Women Affairs and Poverty Alleviation, has joined its counterparts all over the globe, in commemoration of the International Day for Eradication of Poverty (IDEP), as proactive moves in identifying with plight of the vulnerable and indigent Lagos residents.
- The Ministry of Women Affairs and Poverty Alleviation has empowered 250 retiring officers who were trained on 4- weeks short term Skills Acquisition Programme, as part of efforts to enhance their retirement lifestyles.

== Current Commissioner ==
Hon.Cecilia Bolaji Dada was sworn in as the state commissioner of women affairs and poverty alleviation by the Lagos state governor, Babajide Sanwo-Olu on 20 August 2019.

== See also ==
- Lagos State Ministry of Information and Strategy
- Lagos State Executive Council
