= Lagos State Ministry of Housing =

Lagos's Ministry

Ministry overview
- Formed: 1999
- Jurisdiction: Government of Lagos State
- Headquarters: State Government Secretariat, Alausa, Lagos State, Nigeria
- Ministry executive: Hon Moruf Akinderu Fatai, Commissioner
- Website: https://housing.lagosstate.gov.ng/

The Lagos State Ministry of Housing is the state government ministry, charged with the responsibility to plan, devise and implement the state policies on Housing.

The Lagos state current commissioner of housing, Hon.Moruf Akinderu-Fatai has made it known to the general public and people of Lagos state about the intention of the Lagos state government to ease home ownership for its people.

The Bayview Estate, a 100-unit housing project in Ikate-Elegushi, Lekki, was opened by Lagos State Governor Babajide Sanwo-Olu.

== Vision ==
- To establish a sustainable housing delivery system that will ensure easy access to home ownership and rental schemes by the Nigerian populace in an environment where basic physical and social amenities are available.

== Mission ==
- To facilitate the provision of adequate and affordable housing for all Nigerians, in both the urban and rural areas, in secure, healthy and decent environment.

== Departments ==
- Architectural Services.
- Building & Quantity Surveying.
- Engineering Services.
- Lands & Housing.
- Urban & Regional Development.
- Finance & Accounts.
- Human Resources Management.
- Planning, Research & Statistics.

== Units ==
- Federal Housing Authority (FHA).
- Federal Mortgage Bank of Nigeria (FMBN).
- Millennium Development Goals (MDG).
- Public Private Partnership.
- Procurement.
- SERVICOM
- Internal Audit.

== See also ==
- Lagos State Ministry of Health
- Lagos State Executive Council
- Lagos state Ministry of Education
