= Tayo Ayinde =

Nigerian politician

Tayo Akinmade Ayinde (born 24 August 1964) is a Nigerian accountant and administrator. He was appointed in 2019 as the chief of staff to the Lagos State Governor, Babajide Sanwo-Olu.

== Career ==
Ayinde got his Ordinary National Diploma (OND) in Banking and later the Higher National Diploma (HND) in Accountancy from Federal Polytechnic, Anambra. He was an Account Officer at TELL Magazine in 1993. He joined the State Security Service (SSS) where he was Head of the Accounts Department till he retired in 2009. In 2019, he was appointed Chief of Staff by Governor Babajide Sanwoolu.

== Controversies ==
In 2020, after 3 helicopters purchased under Governor Akinwunmi Ambode administration to strengthen security of Lagos the Lagos State House of Assembly summoned Ayinde and two commissioners for questioning. In 2022, Ayinde was accused in a report by Sahara Reporters of using the police and other security forces to assault landowners to forcefully possess and destroy properties worth over N500million.
