= Yetunde Arobieke =

Commissioner in Lagos State

Lagos State Ministry of Local Government and Community Affairs
- In office 2019–2023
- Governor: Babajide Sanwo-Olu

Personal details
- Education: University of Ibadan; Lagos State University

Yetunde Arobieke (born May 6, 1960) is the current commissioner for Local Government and Community Affairs for Lagos State.

== Education ==
Arobieke attended primary school at Ikeja Primary School. Later on, she moved to Multi-Lateral Grammar School, Okun Owa, Ogun State. After completing her primary elementary education, she joined Adeola Odutola College, Ijebu-Ode Ogun State secondary education level, and after graduating, she was admitted into the University of Ibadan, where she graduated with a Bachelor of Science in 1983. She obtained her master's degree in Public Administration from Lagos State University in 2008.

== Career ==
After the National Youth Service, she started her private business dealing with accessories and computers, which led her to establish other successful businesses. These include Compu-point Nigeria Limited, Data point Nigeria limited, Ipod Nigeria limited and Taseto Nigeria Limited. Arobieke serves as the chief executive officer of these companies. Arobieke serves in political offices. She was the first Executive Secretary of Agboyi-Ketu LCDA in 2003, and later on, she became the first executive chairman of Agboyi-Ketu LCDA between 2004 and 2007. Serving in Lagos State, in the first place, she was appointed as an honourable commissioner to serve the Ministry of Local Government and Community Affairs, appointed by Governor Sanwo-Olu in 2019, and recently, she was redeployed to the Ministry of Wealth Creation and Employment in January 2020 till September 2023. Under her administration, she implemented various strategies on how to eradicate unemployment in Lagos State.
