= Ijora, Lagos =

Settlement in Lagos, Nigeria

Coordinates: 6.467°N 3.368°E

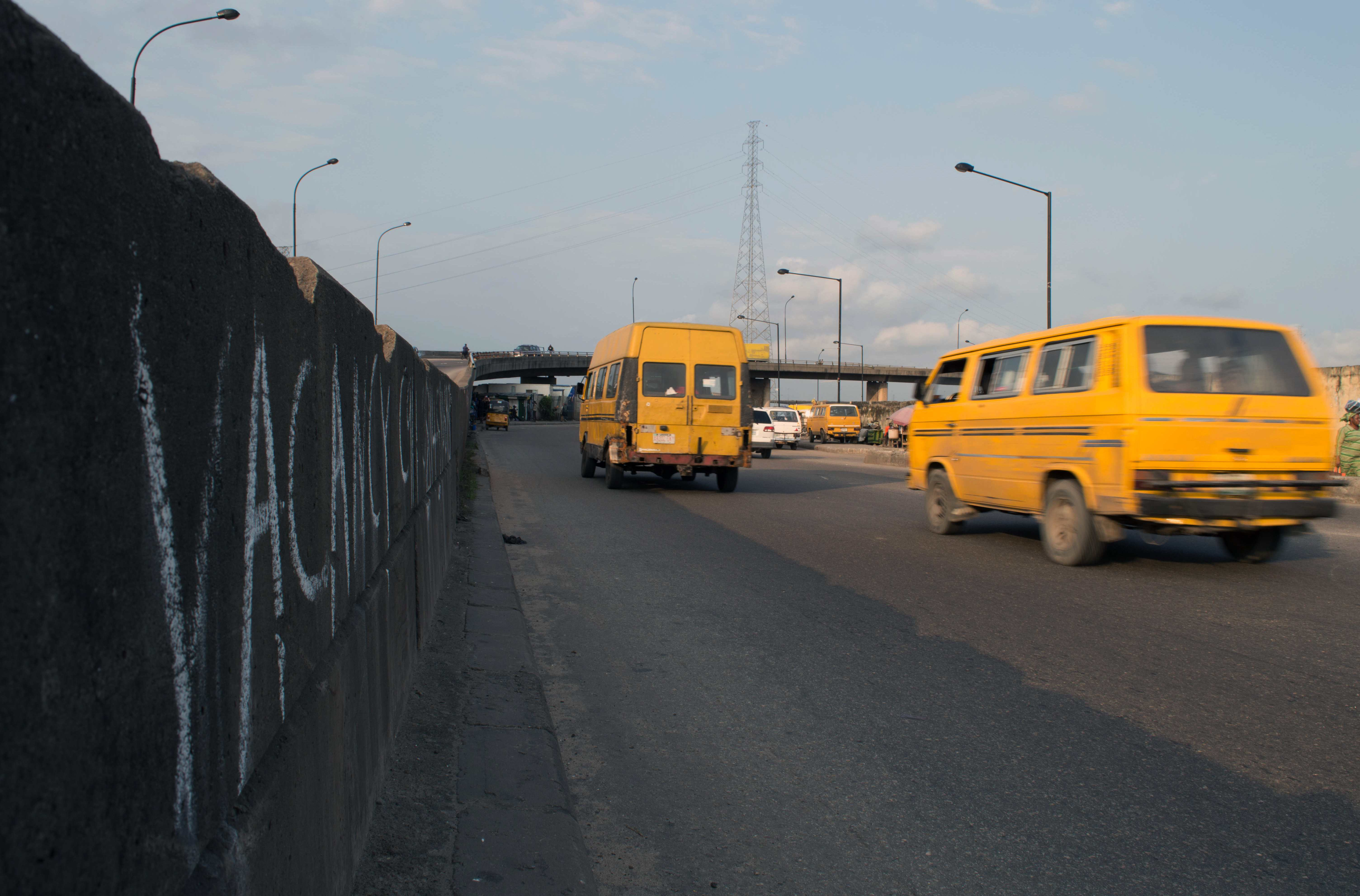
Yellow danfo buses at Ijora badia, Lagos

Ijora is a settlement in Lagos, Nigeria.

== History ==
Ijora was originally a swampy and water-logged village where residents coming from Lagos Island could reach their homes with the use of canoes. The establishment of a railway terminus at Iddo, a nearby settlement boosted the importance of Ijora. In 1919, the colonial government commissioned a coal wharf at Ijora to unload coal for the use of the Nigerian Railway and the Ijora Thermal Station. In 1923, the government constructed the Ijora Thermal Station to generate electricity for the railway and the environs close to Ijora. In the 1960s, the Lagos State town planning authority and the Federal Government of Nigeria decided to zone tracts of land in the area for industrial use The new zoning led to the draining and further reclamation of land.

The industrial estate used to be a base for the firms: K Maroun, Incar cars and West African Cold Storage. The Ijora wharf also functioned as an offloading point for frozen food.

== Sections of Ijora ==
Other neighborhoods in Ijora include Ijora Oloye, Ijora-Badia and Ijora Olopa. Majority of these places are slums. Alleged members of Boko Haram were arrested at Ijora Oloye in 2013 and in 2016.

Ijora-Olopa is a major frozen food market in Lagos. Ajeloro Fish Market in Ijora Coal Wharf is located in this neighborhood.

Ijora-Badia is one of Lagos' under-serviced but high density areas. Many early inhabitants of Ijora-Badia are resettlers from Oluwole Village, when the village was acquired by the government for the construction of the National Theatre. Since the resettlement the neighborhood has grown with large number of people living close to the railway tract.

== Transportation ==
Eko Bridge also known as the second mainland bridge starts from Ijora linking Lagos Island. The Ijora Causeway is a major route to Apapa Wharf. While the Ikorodu - Western (Funsho Williams) Avenue - Apapa Expressway passes through Ijora. The proposed Blue Light Rail Project from Okokomaiko to Marina has a stop close to Ijora.

== Economy ==
The creation of an industrial estate in Ijora led to the establishment of industries in the area. Seven Up Bottling of Nigeria has a factory in the area. Ijora is also close to the Iganmu Industrial Estate and Iddo terminal.

Cummins West Africa/Cummins Nigeria, a division of Cummins Diesel, is headquartered in Ijora.
