= Kick Against Indiscipline =

Kick Against Indiscipline, commonly known as KAI, is an environmental law enforcement unit established in November 2003 by the Lagos State government of Nigeria to monitor and enforce environmental law in the state. The agency was established to support the overall policy of the state government in regards to its "War Against Indiscipline", an anti-indiscipline campaign created by Major General Mohammadu Buhari's military regime in 1984.
