= Lagos State Ministry of Information and Strategy =

Lagos's Ministry

Ministry overview
- Formed: April 1971
- Jurisdiction: Government of Lagos State
- Headquarters: State Government Secretariat, Alausa, Lagos State, Nigeria
- Ministry executive: Gbenga Omotoso, Commissioner
- Website: https://information.lagosstate.gov.ng/

== History ==
The Office of the Secretary to the Government was tasked with administering cabinet concerns, security, establishments, home affairs, and information when the newly constituted Lagos State took off administratively in April 1968. The responsibility for information service was transferred to the military Governor's office as the business of governance got more complex.

In essence, the ministry changed its name from the Secretary of State's Office to the Military Government.

With Badmus as the first Commissioner, it eventually grew into a full-fledged Ministry of Information and Tourism. In April 1971, the Ministry of Information was founded as a separate entity on Victoria Island to handle government contact with the public and the press.

The Lagos State Ministry of Information and Strategy is the state government ministry, charged with the responsibility to plan, devise and implement the state policies on Information and Strategy.

The Ministry was restructured and reorganized in November 2015, under the administration of Governor Akinwunmi Ambode, via Lagos state government circular No.141 dated November 9, 2015, which changed some of the names of existing departments, created a new department, and changed the nomenclature of the Ministry's officers. As a result of this move, all officers in the Ministry who were previously known as "Information Officers" have been renamed "Public Affairs Officers." While the departments are currently referred to as:

- Public Enlightenment & Community Relations
- Information Production
- ICT/Social Media (New)
- Public Affairs Department (Formally called Press and Public Relations)
- Administration/Human Resources (Formally called Finance& Admin.)
- Strategy

== Nomenclature (1971-present) ==
- Ministry of Information and Tourism
- Publicity Department, Governor’s Office
- Ministry of Information, Social Development, Youth, Sports, and Culture
- Ministry of Information and Culture
- Ministry of Information and Culture
- Bureau of Information
- Ministry of Information, Culture and Sports
- Ministry of Information and Strategy

== Statutory responsibilities ==
- Publicity and Mass Media
- Public Relation of Government
- Registration of newspapers \ magazines
- Archives matters
- Publishing and Advertising
- Management of Information on the website of the Lagos State Government.

LIST OF PAST HON. COMMISSIONERS
HON. COMMISSIONERS	TENURE
CHIEF M.A BADMUS	1971-1973
ALHAJI ALADE ODUNEWU	1973-1975
CHIEF ABIMBOLA ODUNLAMI	1975 – AUG. 1977
CHIEF PATRICK SANWO	1977 – JULY 1978
AHMED ONIPEDE	JAN. 1984 – APRIL 1984
AJIPADE ROKOSU	APRIL 1984 – JAN. 1986
ALHAJI LATEEF OLAYINKA	1986 – JULY 1986
MRS MODUPE ADEOGUN	1986 – SEPT. 1989
MR ADESOLA AJETUNMOBI MACAULAY	1989 – DEC. 1991
M.A. AJILOGBA	JULY 1993 – AUG. 1993
CHIEF ADEWALE TOBUN	1993 – SEPT. 1993
CHIEF ABEL KOFI YUSSUPH	1994 – AUG. 1996
PHILLIP O. AIVOJI	MAY 1997 – JULY 1997
COMRADE AYODELE ELESHO	JULY 1997 – MAY 2007
DELE ALAKE	OCT. 1999 – MAY 2007
MICHAEL OPEYEMI BAMIDELE	JULY 2007 – 2011
LATEEF IBIROGBA	MAY 2011 – MAY 2015
MR STEVE AYORINDE	2015 – 2017
Gbenga OMOTOSHO	2019-Till date

== Impact ==
In January 2021, the Lagos State Government increased public campaigning and sensitization in response to the emergence of the second wave of COVID-19. This was accomplished by engagement between Ministry of Information and Strategy officials, led by Toyin Adeni-Awosika, Director of Public Enlightenment, and members of the public.

Members of the public were approached at markets, auto mechanic workshops, garages, and parks in Agege, Ojota, Ikeja, Ogba, Alausa Secretariat, and surrounding areas by the sensitization team. They spoke to the crowd and solicited input, as well as distributing vital information, education, and communication items such as fliers and posters.

== See also ==
- Lagos State Ministry of Women Affairs and Poverty Alleviation
- Lagos State Executive Council
