= Lagos State Ministry of Health =

Government ministry of Lagos, Nigeria

Ministry overview
- Formed: 1967
- Jurisdiction: Government of Lagos State
- Headquarters: State Government Secretariat, Alausa, Lagos State, Nigeria
- Ministry executive: Akin Abayomi, Commissioner
- Website: https://health.lagosstate.gov.ng/

The Lagos State Ministry of Health (Nigeria) is the state government ministry, charged with the responsibility to plan, devise and implement the state policies on health. The State Ministry of Health in conjunction with the Lagos State House of Assembly created the Lagos State Health Scheme law which established the Lagos State Health Management Agency, Lagos State Health Scheme and the Lagos State Health Fund.

== Lagos State Health Scheme ==
The Lagos State Health Scheme (LSHS) was passed into law by the State House of Assembly in May 2015. The scheme is a health insurance initiative of the Lagos State Government aimed at achieving affordable, comprehensive and unhindered quality healthcare services for all Lagos State residents. The Lagos Health Insurance Scheme is also known as "ILERA EKO" and it is administered and regulated by the Lagos State Health Management Agency.

== Lagos State Health Management Agency ==
The Lagos State Health Management Agency (LSHMA) is an agency of the Lagos state Government empowered by law to supervise, regulate, and coordinate the Lagos State health scheme. The mandate of the agency is to "achieve Universal Health Coverage" for all in Lagos State. The agency ensures that enrollees on the Scheme have access to the health services such as "consultation, treatment of ailments such as malaria, hypertension, diabetes, family planning services, dental care, ultrasound scan, radiological investigations, child welfare services, care of childhood illnesses, neonatal services, gynecological prenatal care and delivery".

== Current commissioner ==
Prof Akin Abayomi

== Achievements ==
The Lagos State Government emerged as the most responsive COVID-19 State Government of the Year at the Nigerian Healthcare Excellence Award 2021, due to the state government and the Lagos state ministry of health effective and efficient response to the outbreak of COVID-19.

== See also ==
- Lagos State Ministry of Housing
- Lagos State Executive Council
