= Lagos State Ministry of Works and Infrastructure =

Lagos's Ministry

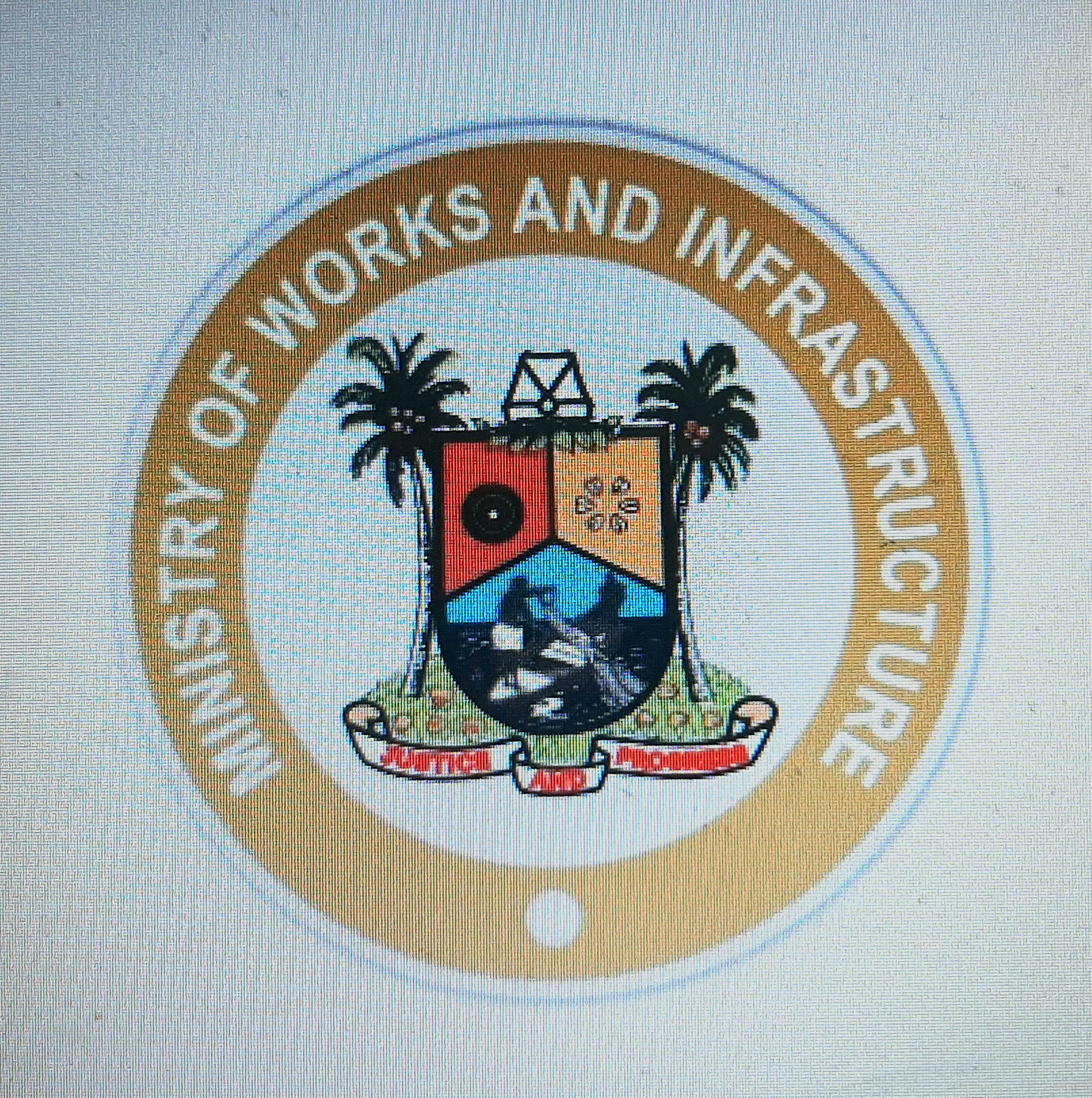

Ministry overview
- Formed: 1967
- Jurisdiction: Government of Lagos State
- Headquarters: State Government Secretariat, Alausa, Lagos State, Nigeria
- Ministry executives: Dr. Adekunle Olayinka FNSE, Special Adviser to the Governor on Works; Engr. Olufemi Olubunmi Daramola, Special Adviser to the Governor on Infrastructure
- Website: https://lagosworksoffice.com.ng/

The Lagos State Ministry of Works and Infrastructure was established in 1967, shortly after the state was established. Due to its strategic importance, it is regarded as the State's engine of growth and development.

The Ministry's nomenclature was re-engineered by the Asiwaju Bola Ahmed Tinubu administration when it was renamed Ministry of Works and Infrastructure with effect from 30 April 2003, due to the dynamic nature of its duties and responsibilities.

- Office of Works
- Lagos State Public Works Corporation
- Rehabilitate bad roads within Lagos
- Office of Infrastructure

== Return to status as Ministry of Works and Infrastructure ==
At the coming on board of the Akinwunmi Ambode administration in 2015, the ministry was taken back to its former status as Ministry of Works and Infrastructure.

The restructure of the State Ministry of Works and Infrastructure by re-establishing the Office of Works and Office of Infrastructure was approved by Lagos State Governor Mr Babajide Sanwo-Olu in 2021. The volume of work ahead of the current administration in the state, led by Babajide Sanwo-Olu, demanded the restructuring of the ministry, as did the necessity to execute necessary structural reviews that would help the government achieve its policy objectives more quickly.

The executive governor, Babajide sanwo-Olu has made it known to the general public that Lagos state will raise capital through Nigerian Exchange Limited(NGX) to fund infrastructure projects.

== PARASTALS ==
- Lagos State Public Works Corporation (PWC)
- Lagos State Materials Testing Laboratory
- Lagos State Infrastructure Asset Management Agency (LASIAMA)
- Lagos State Infrastructure Maintenance and Regulatory Agency (LASIMRA).

The Lagos State Ministry of Works and Infrastructure is the state government ministry, charged with the responsibility to plan, devise and implement the state policies on Works and Infrastructural developments.

== See also ==
- Lagos State Ministry of Environment
- Lagos State Executive Council
