= Moruf Akinderu Fatai =

Nigerian politician

Hon. Moruf Akinderu Fatai

Commissioner for Housing of Lagos State
- Incumbent
- Assumed office 2019
- Governor: Babajide Sanwo-Olu
- Preceded by: Tayo Bamgbose-Martins

Member of the House of Representatives of Nigeria
- In office 2007–2015
- Constituency: Oshodi-Isolo I

Personal details
- Born: Lagos State, Nigeria
- Party: Action Congress of Nigeria
- Profession: Politician, public administrator

Moruf Akinderu Fatai is a Nigerian politician. He was a member of the House of Representatives in the National Assembly, representing Oshodi-Isolo I constituency of Lagos State during the 7th Assembly from 2011 to 2015. In 2023, he was sworn in as the Commissioner for Housing in Lagos State.
