= Ministry of Energy and Mineral Resources (Lagos) =

Lagos's Ministry

Ministry overview
- Jurisdiction: Government of Lagos State
- Headquarters: Block 6, The Secretariat, Alausa, Ikeja Lagos State, Nigeria; 6.6211°N 3.3609°E
- Ministry executive: Mr. Biodun Ogunleye, Honourable Commissioner
- Website: https://memr.lagosstate.gov.ng/

The Ministry of Energy and Mineral Resources is the state government ministry of Lagos, charged with the responsibility to plan, devise and implement the state policies on Energy and Mineral Resources.

== Historical Background ==
The Ministry of Energy and Mineral Resources, formerly known as the Office of the Special Adviser on Mineral Resources Development, was established in July 2011 with the goal of increasing capacity to meet citizens' electricity needs.

In 2020, Lagos state through its ministry of energy and mineral resources, recently partnered with Eko Innovation Centre to increase citizens of Lagos' access to dependable and inexpensive smart meters.

The Ministry is in charge of conceptualizing, advocating, and establishing sustainable policies for energy planning in order to ensure that all Lagos citizens have access to reliable electricity.

== See also ==
- Lagos State Ministry of Establishments, Training and Pensions
- Lagos State Executive Council
