= Lagos State Ministry of Establishments, Training and Pensions =

Lagos's Ministry

Ministry overview
- Jurisdiction: Government of Lagos State
- Headquarters: State Government Secretariat, Alausa, Lagos State, Nigeria
- Ministry executive: Mrs. Ajibola Ponnle, Commissioner

The Lagos State Ministry of Establishments, Training and Pensions is the state government ministry, charged with the responsibility to plan, devise and, implement the state policies on Establishments, Training and Pensions.

The Ministry of Establishments, Training, and Pensions is the government's key human resource management agency, in charge of human capital development, career advancement, and, retirement.

The Lagos State Ministry of Establishments and, Training has existed since the state's inception. The previous Ministry of Establishments, Pensions, and Training was split up into the Office of Establishments and, Training in February 2001.

Mrs. Ajibola Ponnle serves as the Honourable Commissioner for Lagos state ministry of Establishments, Training and Pensions.

== See also ==
- Lagos State Ministry of Energy and Mineral Resources
- Lagos State Executive Council
