= Lagos State Ministry of Science and Technology =

Lagos's Ministry

Ministry overview
- Jurisdiction: Government of Lagos State
- Headquarters: State Government Secretariat, Alausa, Lagos State, Nigeria
- Ministry executive: Hakeem Fahm, Commissioner
- Website: https://most.lagosstate.gov.ng/

The Lagos State Ministry of Science and Technology is a state government ministry, charged with the responsibility to plan, devise and implement the state policies on Science and Technology.

The Ministry of Information Technology and Special Services was established in February 2004 by Asiwaju Bola Ahmed Tinubu's administration from the Office of Special Adviser on Information Technology and Special Services. The Administration has identified the use of technology as one of the most effective ways to address the difficulties of improving government service delivery while also ensuring economic and social progress.

== Mission ==
- To employ Science and Technology in all activities towards improving the quality of life of Lagosians and Transforming Lagos, through strategic and co-ordinated utilization of available resources into a developed industrial, and modern State of international stature.

== Vision ==
- To make Lagos a model state through the innovative application of Science and Technology for solving problems and making impact in all human endeavours.

== Directorates ==
- Administration and Human Resources [A & HR]
- Computer Services [CS]
- Information Communication Technology[ICT]
- Science, Policy, Programmes and Promotion[SPPP]
- Finance and Accounts F & A

== Units ==
- Engineering.
- Procurement.
- The Internal Audit.
- Planning.
- Public Affairs.
- Service Delivery.

== Agency ==
- Lagos State Residents Registration Agency (LASRRA)

== Objectives ==
- To properly manage the State’s Global Computerization Projects.
- To utilize modern technology for the effective management of Government business, particularly in the areas of operational activities, revenue generation and electronic information dissemination.
- To utilize Science and Technology to improve the lot of citizens of the State.

== See also ==
- Lagos State Ministry of Commerce and Industry
- Lagos State Executive Council
