= Lagos State Ministry of Special Duties and Intergovernmental Relations =

Lagos's Ministry

Ministry overview
- Formed: 1999
- Jurisdiction: Government of Lagos State
- Headquarters: State Government Secretariat, Alausa, Lagos State, Nigeria
- Ministry executive: Engr. Tayo Bamgbose-Martins, Honourable Commissioner
- Website: https://specialduties.lagosstate.gov.ng/

During the first term of Asiwaju Bola Ahmed Tinubu's administration in 1999, the Ministry of Special Duties and Inter-Governmental Relations was created from the Governor's Office's political and General Administration Office.

Job creation department was later added to the Ministry in August 2004, from 2006 to 2010, the Ministry was in charge of the defunct Eko Engineering Ventures Limited, which was entrusted to a private public partnership office for re-engineering into a car workshop and skills acquisition center in collaboration with a recognized private enterprise.

The Ministry's jurisdiction was expanded further with the establishment of the Lagos State Emergency Management Agency (LASEMA) and safety commissions, both of which are responsible for responding to and preventing disasters in the state and are under the Ministry's direct supervision.

== Vision ==
Safety manager focused on strategic thinking and planning within a robust Research and Development Environment where safety will be a culture between the government and essential stakeholders.

== Mission ==
To effectively arm and build suitable synergy between the Ministry of Special Duties and Intergovernmental Relations, MDAs, key stakeholders, and the general public in order to create a safe and disaster-free environment through the use of Innovation, Research, and Development.
