= Lagos State Ministry of Justice =

Ministry overview
- Jurisdiction: Government of Lagos State
- Headquarters: State Government Secretariat, Alausa, Lagos State, Nigeria
- Ministry executives: Mr. Moyosore Onigbanjo SAN, Attorney General and Commissioner for Justice; Titilayo Shitta-Bey, Solicitor-General and Permanent Secretary
- Website: http://lagosministryofjustice.org/

The Lagos State Ministry of Justice is the state government ministry, concerned with the administration of justice. The Ministry is under the coordination of the Attorney-General and Commissioner for Justice, who is often assisted by the Solicitor-General and Permanent Secretary.

== Mission ==
- Working together to serve the people by professional and ethical standard to promote access to justice regardless of socio-economic class and to attract, develop, motivate and retain the best law officers within a supportive work environment.

== Vision ==
- To be the public legal service that promote integrity, values innovations, and a tradition where merit is the primary key to advancement.

== Responsibility ==
- The ministry focuses on legislative reforms and initiatives. Particularly in the domain of public law and the strengthening of the legal environment to encourage economic activity. Its mission is to promote and improve justice for all residents.

== See also ==
- Lagos State Ministry of Physical Planning and Urban Development
- Lagos State Executive Council
