= Lagos State Ministry of Physical Planning and Urban Development =

Lagos's Ministry

Ministry overview
- Jurisdiction: Government of Lagos State
- Headquarters: State Government Secretariat, Alausa, Lagos State, Nigeria
- Ministry executive: Engr. Bamgbose Martins, Commissioner

The Lagos State Ministry of Physical Planning and Urban Development is the state government ministry, charged with the responsibility to plan, devise and implement the state policies on Physical Planning and Urban Development. The ministry is headed by a commissioner, who is assisted by the Permanent Secretary.

== See also ==
- Lagos State Ministry of Justice
