= Alausa =

Alawusa
- District
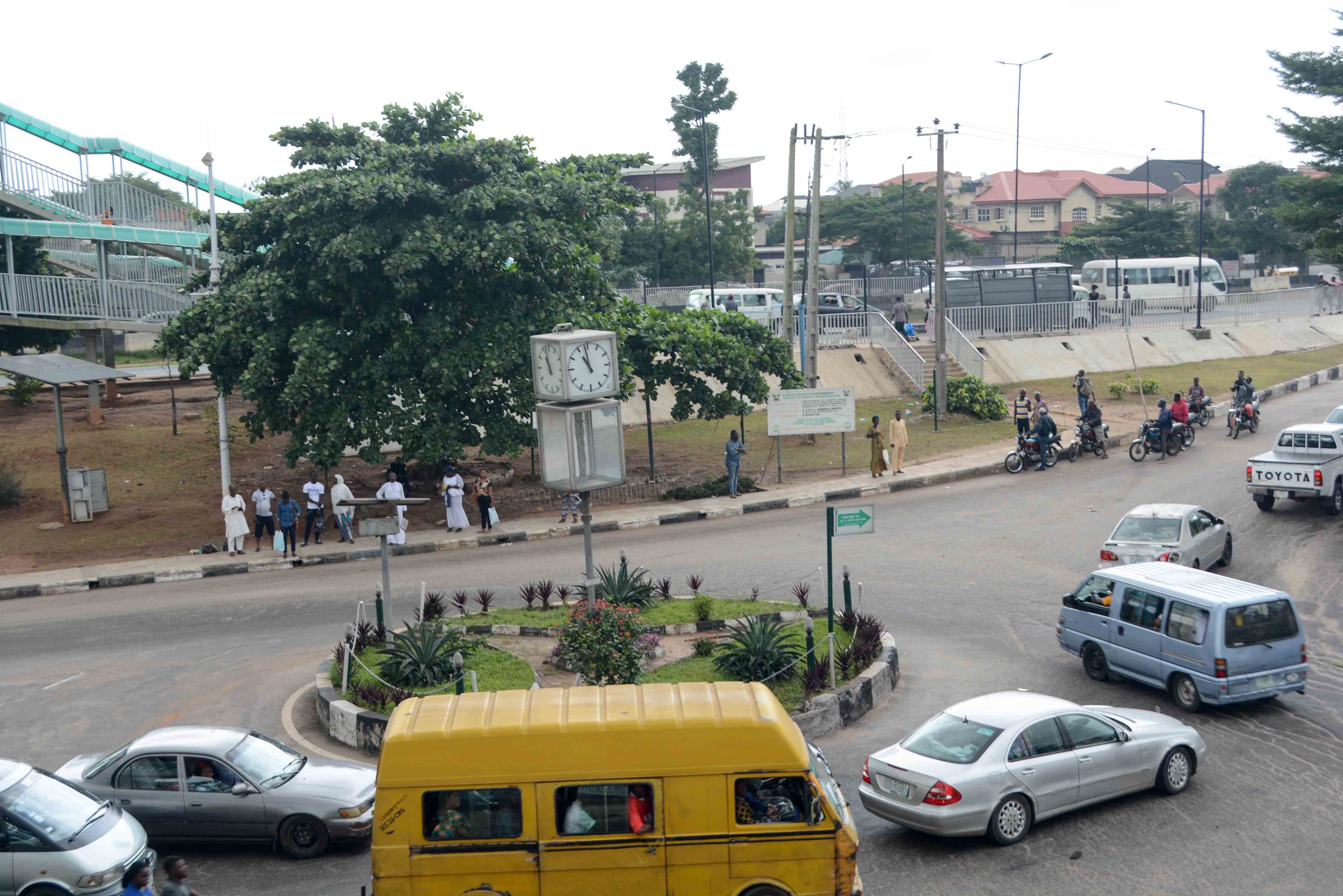
- Nickname: Alausa
- Location in Nigeria
- Coordinates: 6°37′15″N 3°21′40″E
- Country: Nigeria
- State: Lagos State
- Seat: Lagos State Secretariat

Government
  - Baale: Alhaji Muftau Toyin Bhadmus
- Time zone: UTC+1 (WAT)

Alawusa, commonly known as Alausa is a principal district in Ikeja, the state capital of Lagos State. It is the seat of the Lagos State Secretariat and offices of the Governor and Deputy-Governor of Lagos State after creation on May 27, 1967 during the military administration of General Yakubu Gowon. Alawusa also has a vibrant and growing Central Business District with several multinational business concerns like Cadbury Nigeria Plc and many others having their offices located in the area. It also has many low density residential estates like the Cornerstone Estate; MKO Abiola Gardens located within it.

On October 4, 2020, Alhaji Muftau Toyin Bhadmus of the Odewale ruling house was installed as the new Baale of Alausa, Ikeja.
