= Lagos State Ministry of Home Affairs =

Lagos's Ministry

Ministry overview
- Formed: 1979
- Jurisdiction: Government of Lagos State
- Headquarters: State Government Secretariat, Alausa, Lagos State, Nigeria
- Ministry executive: Prince Anofiu Olanrewaju Elegushi, Honourable commissioner
- Website: https://homeaffair.lagosstate.gov.ng/

The Lagos State Ministry of Home Affairs was founded in 1979, the ministry of home affairs has gone through several stages of development and reform, both in terms of nomenclature and responsibilities. The Ministry of Home Affairs, Lottery, and Pools Betting was established under Governor Lateef Jakande's administration.

During the administration of Navy Capt. Mike Akhigbe, the Office was transformed into a full-fledged Ministry of Home Affairs and Tourism, with Mr. Franklin Adejuwon as First Honourable Commissioner and Mr Musuliu Obanikoro as Second Honourable Commissioner.

Akinwunmi Ambode, former governor of Lagos state, renamed it the Ministry of Home Affairs in 2015, and the Ministry of Tourism, Arts and Culture, and Special Duties were reassigned to the Ministries of Tourism, Arts and Culture, and Special Duties, respectively.
