= Lagos State Ministry of Tourism, Arts and Culture =

To attain Sustainable Tourism Development through an enabling environment

Ministry overview
- Formed: 1995
- Jurisdiction: Government of Lagos State
- Headquarters: State Government Secretariat, Alausa, Lagos State, Nigeria
- Ministry executive: Toke Benson-Awoyinka, Honourable Commissioner
- Website: https://tourismartandculture.lagosstate.gov.ng/

Captain Mike Akhigbe's Military Administration established tourism as a department under the Ministry of Home Affairs in Lagos State in 1995.

The Tourism Department was transferred from the Ministry of Home Affairs and united with the Ministry of Information and Culture in 1991, forming the Bureau of Information, Culture, and Tourism, which was headed by a Permanent Secretary.

In 1994, the Tourism Department was separated from the Bureau of Information, Culture, and Tourism and merged with the Ministry of Commerce, Industry, and Tourism (MCIT), with the permanent secretary's position replaced by a Commissioner.

In 1998, the Lagos State Tourism Board and the Tourism Department merged to form the Lagos State Waterfront and Tourism Development Corporation (LSWTDC), which is led by a managing director.

The LSWTDC was split into two ministries in 2007, the Ministry of Tourism and Intergovernmental Relations and the Ministry of Waterfront Infrastructure Development.

In 2015, the Ministry of Tourism Arts and Culture was named and expanded its Ministerial responsibilities under the administration of His Excellency, Mr. Akinwunmi Ambode.
