= Lagos State Ministry of Economic Planning and Budget =

Nigerian government ministry

Ministry overview
- Formed: June 1999
- Jurisdiction: Government of Lagos State
- Headquarters: State Government Secretariat, Alausa, Lagos State, Nigeria
- Ministry executives: Mr. Mosopefolu George, Honourable Commissioner; Mr. Lekan Balogun, Special Adviser
- Website: https://lagosmepb.org/

The Lagos State Ministry of Economic Planning and Budget is a government ministry of Lagos State, Nigeria. It is tasked with the responsibility to plan, draft and implement policies on the state's economic planning and budget. The ministry was formed in June 2009.

== Responsibilities ==
- Preparation of Annual Budget of the State Government and processing of Annual Budget of Parastatals.
- Advisory services on Local Government Budget.
- Production of statistical data on the activities of the State Government.
- Offering advice to Government on implementation of project and programmes.
- Commissioning and commenting on feasibility studies, plans and programmes of Ministries, Offices and Bureau.

== See also ==
- Lagos State Ministry of Finance
- Lagos State Executive Council
