= Governor of Lagos State =

Head of government of Lagos State in Nigeria

- Flag of Lagos State

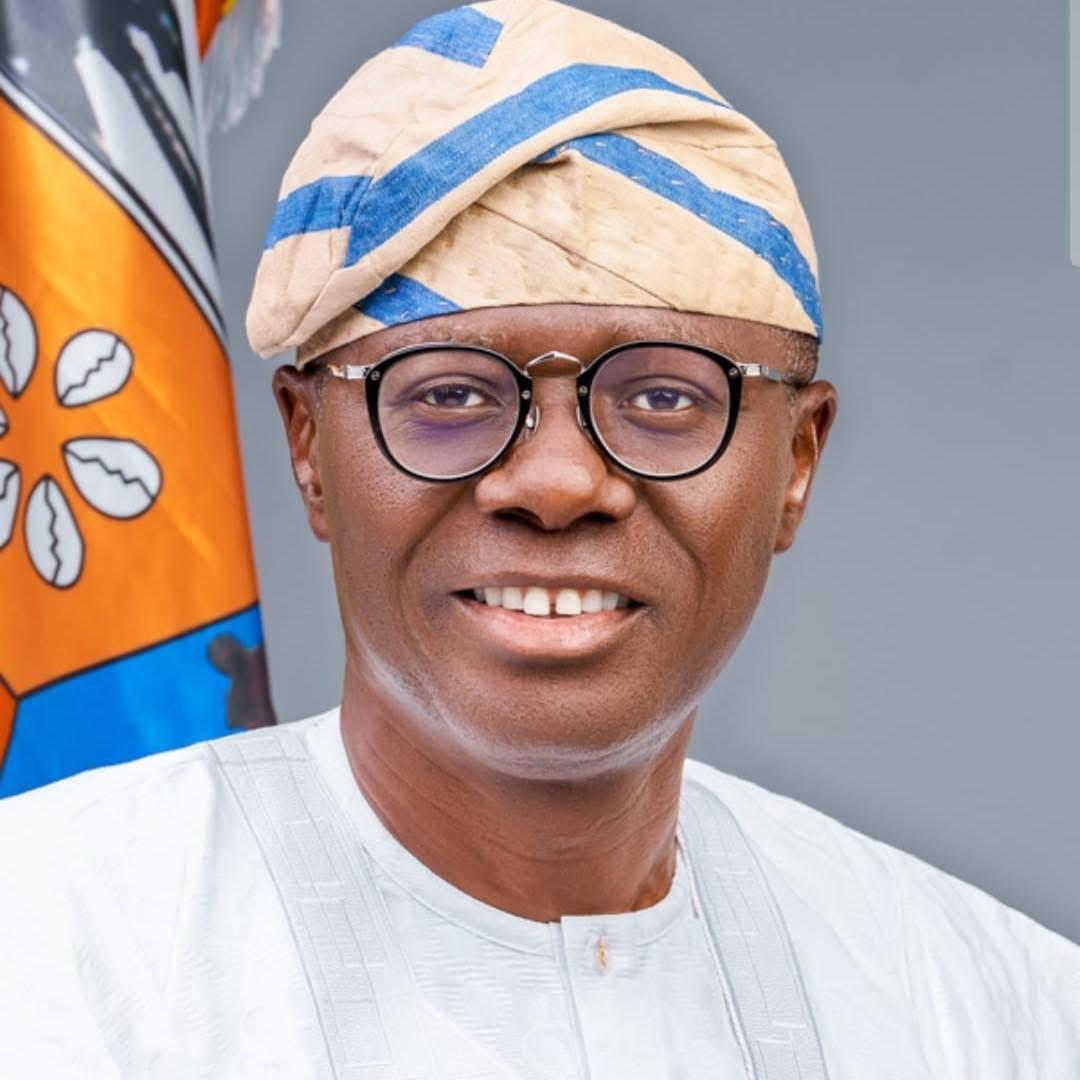
- Incumbent; Babajide Sanwo-Olu since 29 May 2019
- Executive Branch of the Lagos State Government
- Style: His Excellency
- Type: Head of state; Head of government
- Member of: Lagos State Executive Council
- Residence: Lagos House
- Seat: Ikeja
- Appointer: Direct popular election or via succession from deputy governorship
- Term length: Four years renewable once
- Constituting instrument: Constitution of Nigeria
- Formation: 27 May 1967 (59 years ago)
- First holder: Mobolaji Johnson
- Deputy: Deputy Governor of Lagos State

The governor of Lagos State is the head of government of Lagos State in Nigeria. The governor leads the executive branch of the Lagos State Government. This position places its holder in leadership of the state with command authority over the state affairs. The Governor is frequently described to be the number one citizen of the state. Article II of the Constitution of Nigeria vests the executive power of the state in the governor and charges him with the execution of state law, alongside the responsibility of appointing state executive, diplomatic, regulatory, and judicial officers subject to the approval of the Assembly members.

== Powers and duties ==
=== Legislative role ===
The first power the Constitution confers upon the governor is the veto. The Presentment Clause requires any bill passed by the Lagos State House of Assembly to be presented to the governor before it can become law. Once the legislation has been presented, the governor has three options:

1. Sign the legislation; the bill then becomes law.
2. Veto the legislation and return it to the state house of assembly expressing any objections; the bill does not become law, unless the member of the house votes to override the veto by a two-thirds vote.

=== Administrative powers ===
The Governor is made the sole repository of the executive powers of Lagos State, and the powers entrusted to him as well as the duties imposed upon him are awesome indeed. The governor is the head of the executive branch of the state government and is constitutionally obligated to "take care that the laws be faithfully executed." The governor makes numerous executive branch appointments: commissioners and other state officers, are all appointed by the governor with subject to the approval of the state assembly. The power of the governor to sack executive officials has long been a contentious political issue. Generally, the governor may remove purely executive officials at his discretion. However, the assembly can curtail and constrain a governor's authority to sack commissioners of independent regulatory agencies and certain inferior executive officers by statute. The governor additionally possesses the ability to direct much of the executive branch through executive orders that are grounded in Law of the Lagos State or constitutionally granted executive power.

=== Juridical powers ===
The governor also has the power to nominate the chief judge of the state. However, these nominations do require the house of assembly confirmation. Securing house approval can provide a major obstacle for governors who wish to orient the state judiciary toward a particular ideological stance. Governors may also grant pardons and reprieves, as is often done just before the end of a governorship term, not without controversy.

=== Legislative facilitator ===
The Constitution's Ineligibility Clause prevents the governor (and all other executive officers) from simultaneously being a member of the state house of assembly. Therefore, the governor cannot directly introduce legislative proposals for consideration in the house. However, the governor can take an indirect role in shaping legislation, especially if the governor's political party has a majority in the house (house of representative). For example, the governor or other officials of the executive branch may draft legislation and then ask representatives to introduce these drafts into the house. The governor can further influence the legislative branch through constitutionally mandated, periodic reports to the house. Additionally, the governor may attempt to have the house alter proposed legislation by threatening to veto that legislation if the changes he requests are not made.

== Selection process ==
=== Eligibility ===
The Governor is directly elected by the people through a registered political party to a four-year term, and is one of only two elected state officers, the other being the Deputy Governor. Chapter six of the 1999 constitution Nigeria as amended sets the requirements to hold the office. A governor must:

- Be a natural-born citizen of Nigeria.
- Be at least thirty-five years old.
- Be a member of a registered political party and sponsored by that political party.
- Must possess at least the West Africa School Certificate or its equivalent.

== See also ==
- List of state governors of Nigeria
