= Ashiru =

Ashiru may refer to:

== People ==
=== Middle name ===
- Aminu Ashiru Mani (born 1972), Nigerian politician
- Isa Ashiru Kudan (born 1962), Nigerian politician

=== Surname ===
- Deji Ashiru, Nigerian engineer
- George Ashiru, Nigerian Taekwondo grandmaster
- Lola Ashiru (born 1955), Nigerian architect and politician
- Musefiu Ashiru (born 1994), Nigerian professional footballer
- Oladapo Ashiru, Nigerian professor and author
- Olugbenga Ashiru (1948-2014), Nigerian politician and diplomat
