= Chief Judge of Lagos State =

Head of the Lagos State Judiciary

- Incumbent; Kazeem Alogba since 10 June 2019
- Style: My Lord (Informal); The Honorable (Formal); Your Lordship (When addressed directly in court)
- Appointer: Lagos State Governor nomination with House of Assembly confirmation
- Term length: 4 years
- Formation: 27 May 1967 (59 years ago)

The Chief Judge of Lagos State is the head of the Lagos State Judiciary, the judicial branch of the Lagos State Government and the chief judge of the High Court of Lagos State. From 1967 to 1973, the title was called Chief Justice of the Supreme Court. The appointment is often made by the Governor. "Section 271(1) of the Constitution provides that ‘The appointment of a person to the office of the Chief Judge of a State shall be made by the Governor of the State on the recommendation of the National Judicial Council, subject to the confirmation of the appointment by the House of Assembly of the State,’".

== Powers and duties ==
The Chief Judge is the highest judicial officer in the state, and acts as a chief administrative officer as well as spokesperson for the judicial branch. The Chief Judge presides over oral arguments before the court. When the court renders an opinion, the Chief Justice—when in the majority—decides who writes the court's opinion. The Chief Justice also has significant agenda-setting power over the court's meetings. The Chief Judge sets the agenda for the weekly meetings where the justices review the petitions for certiorari, to decide whether to hear or deny each case.

=== Superiority ===
The Chief Judge is considered to be the justice with most superior, independent of the number of years of service in the High Court. The Chief Judge, therefore chairs the conferences where cases are discussed and voted on by other judges in the state. The Chief Judge often speaks first, and so has influence in framing the discussion. The Chief Judge sets the agenda for the weekly meetings where the justices review the petitions for certiorari, to decide whether to hear or deny each cases in the years to come. The Chief Judge serves as the commission's chairman.

=== Oath of office ===
The Chief Judge typically administers the oath of office at the inauguration of the Lagos State Governor. In a situation where the Chief Judge is ill or incapacitated, the oath is usually administered by the Attorney General. Also the Attorney General typically administers the oath of office at the inauguration of the Chief Judge. In addition, the Chief Judge normally administers the oath of office to newly appointed and confirmed associate judges.

== History ==
The Lagos State Judiciary is the first established Judiciary in Nigeria and formerly known as Colony Province Judiciary. Magistrate court was the first to be established among others. It was established before the High court, that was formerly referred to as the Supreme Court but and its jurisdiction was localized. The establishment of the Magistrate court give birth to the High court, the then Lagos State Supreme Court. When the Supreme Court of Nigeria was founded, the Lagos Supreme Court metamorphosed into High Court of the Federal Territory Lagos with concurrent appointment of John Taylor as the Chief judge.

On 27 May 1967, the same year Lagos State was formed, the High Court and the Magistrate Court of the Federal Territory were merged to form the Lagos State Judiciary under the Leadership of John Taylor, the pioneer Chief Judge of Lagos State. Taylor's tenure elapsed on 7 November 1973 and was succeeded by Justice Joseph Adefarasin following his appointment that took effect on 1 November 1974. He served in that capacity for 9 years until 24 April 1985 when is tenure ended. He was succeeded by Justice Candide Ademola Johnson, appointed on 25 April 1985, a day after Justice Joseph left the office. He spent 4 years in office and Justice Ligali Ayorinde succeeded him on 10 July 1989. He served in that capacity for 6 years I.e between July 1989 to April 1995. The first woman to be appointed was Rosaline Omotosho, who served from 12 April 1995 to 27 February 1996.

On 20 October 2017, the Governor of Lagos State Mr Akinwunmi Ambode appointed Hon Justice Opeyemi Oke as the New Chief Judge of Lagos State. This was after the erstwhile Chief Judge Oluwafunmilayo Olajumoke Atilade attained the mandatory retirement age of 65 years.

On 10 June 2019, Honorable Justice Kazeem Alogba was appointed as the acting Chief Judge of Lagos State by His Excellency, Babajide Sanwo-Olu, the Governor of Lagos State. On 21 August 2019 he was confirmed and sworn in as the 17th Chief Judge of Lagos State.

== List of chief judges ==
Source: Lagos State Judiciary

Chief Judges	Term
John Idowu Conrad Taylor	22 July 1964 – 7 November 1973
Joseph Adetunji Adefarasin	1 November 1974 – 24 April 1985
Candide Ademola Johnson	25 April 1985 – 1 July 1989
Ligali Akanni Ayorinde	1 July 1989 – 10 April 1995
Roseline Ajoke Omotoso	12 April 1995 – 27 February 1996
Olusola Olatunde Thomas	15 March 1996 – 1 November 1996
Samuel Omotunde Ilori	27 December 1996 – 5 January 1999
Sikiru Olatunde Adagun	3 May 1999 – 22 May 1999
Christopher Olatunde Segun	24 May 1999 – 25 May 2001
Ibitola Adebisi Sotuminu	28 May 2001 – 5 May 2004
Afolabi Fatai Adeyinka	8 March 2004 – 2 July 2004
Augustine Adetula Alabi	8 July 2004 – 7 August 2009
Inumidun Enitan Akande	8 September 2009 – 10 June 2012
Ayotunde Adeyoola Phillips	14 June 2012 – 26 July 2014
Oluwafunmilayo Olajumoke Atilade	20 August 2014 – 22 September 2017
Opeyemi Olufunmilayo Oke	20 October 2017 – 10 June 2019
Kazeem Olanrewaju Alogba	20 August 2019
