= Victor Malu Military Tribunal =

Military tribunal

Victor Malu Military Tribunal is a seven-man special military tribunal (SMT) commissioned by the administration of general Sani Abacha in the year 1997, headed by general Victor Malu, to investigate roles played by soldiers and civilians in the coup plot to overthrow general Abacha’s regime. The SMT was located in Jos Plateau, Plateau state Nigeria.

== Overview ==
On 21 December 1997, General Sani Abacha constituted a SMT to carry out investigation into the allegation surrounding the alleged coup plot against his government. The plotters include former Deputy Head of State, Lieutenant-General

Oladipo Diya, Major General Tunji Olanrewaju, Major General Abdulkareem Adisa, Daniel Akintonde, Edwin Jando, Peters Alinyode, Emmanuel Shode, Major Olusegun Fadipe, and Diya's political advisor, professor Femi Odekunle. The investigation started on 14 February 1998.[2]

== Allegation of the coup plot ==
Eight top military officers led by former Deputy Head of State, Lieutenant General Oladipo Diya were arrested for plotting coup to topple the government of general Abacha. As a result of this scenario, the federal government of Nigeria (FGN) led by general Abacha commissioned a panel of a seven(7) military officers headed by general Malu.

== Outcome of the Special Military Tribunal ==
The SMT charged general Diya, five other soldiers and a civilian for treason. They were to be executed by firing squad Among the accomplice, four were sentenced to life imprisonment and the remaining three to stand 2–14 years behind bar.

== Reaction to the judgement ==
The judgment of death sentences issued by the SMT headed by general Malu attracted reactions from within and outside the country. Adisa Bakare, father of general Abdulkareem told journalist that "I beg General Sani Abacha to spare the lives of my son and others" In related development, the human right community led by National Democratic Coalition (NADECO) through Abraham Adesanya said "We are not convinced that they committed the offence for which they were found guilty," added Adesanya. "Judging by the past record of this government, with regards to Ken Saro Wiwa and others, it is a waste of time to plead. But God is higher than everybody.". Also, the Christian Association of Nigeria appealed to the government to spear the life of the convicts".
