= Abraham Adesanya =

Nigerian politician and lawyer (1922–2008)

Chief Abraham Adesanya
- Born: Abraham Aderibigbe Adesanya; 24 July 1922; Ijebu Igbo, Southern Region, British Nigeria (now in Ogun State, Nigeria)
- Died: 27 April 2008 (aged 85)
- Citizenship: Nigeria; United States
- Education: Holborn College of Law
- Occupations: Politician; lawyer; activist
- Political party: Action Group
- Spouse: Rosannah Arinola Adesanya
- Children: Adebayo Adesanya; Oluwasegunfunmi Adesanya; Modupeola Adesanya Adelaja; Olufemi Adesanya
- Parents: Ezekiel Adesanya (father); Elizabeth Odiya Adesanya (mother)

Chief Abraham Aderibigbe Adesanya // (24 July 1922 – 27 April 2008) was a Nigerian politician, lawyer, activist, welfarist, and liberal progressive. He was a member of the Action Group, on whose platform he was elected to the Western House of Assembly to represent Ijebu-Igbo constituency in 1959. He served in the Nigerian Senate during the Second Republic under the Unity Party of Nigeria. He was a leader of the pan-Yoruba socio-cultural group, Afenifere, and a founding member of the National Democratic Coalition (NADECO), whose activism contributed to the return of democratic rule in 1999.

== Early life and education ==
Adesanya was the son of a famous and powerful traditional healer, the late Oloye Ezekiel Adesanya (alias Baba Obu’keagbo), who lived between the 19th and 20th centuries. His mother was Elizabeth Odiya Adesanya.

Adesanya attended Ijebu Ode Grammar School, after which he worked as a teacher prior to travelling to the United Kingdom to study law at the then Holborn College of Law, Gray's Inn.

== Early political life ==
In 1959, Adesanya returned to Nigeria as a qualified lawyer and joined the Action Group led by Obafemi Awolowo. The same year, he was nominated and eventually elected to the Western House of Assembly to represent Ijebu Igbo constituency in the 12 December 1959 House of Representatives Election.

Having qualified as an exemplar of the Action Group's core social democratic ideals, he secured another nomination to the second republic Senate. He was said to have preferred his senatorial appointment to the governorship ticket that was originally offered to him by the Unity Party of Nigeria, a successor to the Action Group. This principle was to be further justified in the roles played by him in the effort to redefine Nigerian politics and Nigerian democracy.

He was a dedicated Awoist (this being the term for a disciple of Awolowo's). He led a team of lawyers that defended Chief Awolowo against the Nigerian Federal Government's charges of treason in 1962.

== As a leader and activist ==
In the aftermath of the deaths of Obafemi Awolowo and Adekunle Ajasin, Adesanya assumed the honorific title 'Asiwaju of Yorubaland' and simultaneously became more active politically, allying with Bola Ige, Ayo Adebanjo, Ganiyu Dawodu, and Bola Tinubu to fight their way to victory in six states of the defunct Western region with their political party, the Alliance for Democracy.

Later Adesanya, under the auspices of Afenifere and the Yoruba council of Elders, led a congress of Yoruba elder-statesmen through an assembly that rose to pronounce that the convocation of a constitutional conference, where new confederating terms would be determined for the country, was necessary for the good of Nigerians.

Adesanya was the deputy leader of the National Democratic Coalition (NADECO), a pro-democracy movement formed in 1994.

== Turbulence and victory ==
At the peak of military persecution, many of the then pro-democracy activists, including his leader in the National Democratic Coalition (NADECO), Chief Anthony Enahoro, fled the country and went into exile. Adesanya remained at home, working for the cause of the Nigerian masses alongside such figures as Gani Fawehinmi, Femi Falana, Olisa Agbakoba and a host of others. The Nigerian pro-democracy movement's victories were few and far between at this period - first, the independent press was gagged, then a number of people agitating for a return to civilian rule were arrested. Adesanya acted as the champion of the ordinary Nigerian regardless of the danger to his person, persistently condemning General Ibrahim Babangida’s annulment of the 12 June Presidential election that had been won by Chief MKO Abiola. When General Sani Abacha, Babangida's successor, attempted to transform from a military head of state to a civilian president, Adesanya made certain that both he and NADECO remained a thorn in the General's side. When democracy was finally restored in 1999, he joined other prominent Nigerians in overseeing the transition from military rule. These feats saw both him and his group come into the international limelight, featuring in reported news and commentaries about Nigeria.

On 14 January 1997, Adesanya's uncompromising stance in regards to military misrule led to an attempt on his life at the behest of the then head of state, General Sani Abacha. Adesanya had just left his law chambers in his chauffeur-driven car when a team of would-be assailants (later revealed to be General Abacha's hit squad) struck. By the time they were done, the windscreens of the car were shattered and the seats were perforated by bullets. Neither he nor his driver was injured. The car, a Mercedes-Benz, was ultimately transferred to the ownership of a Lagos museum.

== Personal life ==
Adesanya was married to Rosannah Arinola Adesanya (née Onafalujo), who died nearly three years after him. They had four children: Adebayo Adesanya, Oluwasegunfunmi Adesanya, Modupeola Adesanya Adelaja, and Olufemi Adesanya. They had 10 grandchildren.

== Illness and death ==
In his later years, Adesanya was decidedly frail due to illness. He was ultimately incapacitated, leading to his confinement in his Apapa residence. Following this, his leadership of Afenifere adopted an advisory quality to accommodate his new circumstances.

He died on 27 April 2008, while having breakfast. He was 85 years old.

== Legacy ==
Since his death, he has been immortalised in a number of ways, especially by the six southwestern states of Lagos, Oyo, Ogun, Ondo, Osun and Ekiti.

A government-owned higher institution in Ogun State, formerly known as The Polytechnic and located in Atikori, Ijebu-Igbo, Ogun State, was renamed Abraham Adesanya Polytechnic (AAPOLY) in his honour.
