= Enahoro =

Enahoro is a surname that is mainly found in Nigeria. Notable people with the surname include:

- Anthony Enahoro (1923–2010), Nigerian democracy activist and politician
- Chris Enahoro (born 1983), Australian former rugby league footballer
- Peter Enahoro (1935–2023), Nigerian journalist, author, and publisher
- Tunde Enahoro (born 1990), Nigerian former footballer
