= Okojie =

- Gender: Male
- Language: Edo

Origin
- Word/name: Nigeria
- Meaning: royalty and anything related

Okojie is a Nigerian surname of Edo origin. It is known to mean royalty and anything related.

== Notable people with the surname include ==
- Benita Okojie (born 1988), Nigerian gospel singer
- Christopher Okojie (1920–2006), Nigerian doctor and politician
- Ogbidi Okojie (1857–1944), Nigerian royalty
- Victoria Okojie, Nigerian librarian, academician, and administrator
