= Amedokhian =

Welcome to Amedokhian sign post

Amedokhian is a community located within Uromi, in Esan North-East Local Government Area, Edo State, Nigeria. According to local oral story, the community have local traditional institutions and age-grade organisations.

== Historical origins and migration ==
According to oral traditions the people of Amedokhian trace their ancestral origins to Ebhokhimhin (Ewohimi). They migrated from Okanigben (Okaegben) due to internal conflict.

Amedokhian also holds a significant place in Esan and colonial history: it was the site where Onojie Okolo, the father of Onojie Ogbidi, was killed by British invaders. In retaliation, Ogbidi is said to have killed the British captain at Amedokhian—marking it as a historic location of resistance against colonial forces.

== Structure and governance ==
Amedokhian is governed through a gerontocratic system, in which age and seniority define leadership. This is rooted in the age-grade institution (Otu), which continues to operate in the community. The structure exists at multiple levels: the town, the two villages, and quarters. That is, Idumhun Odeva and Idigun and their constituent quarters (Idumu).

The age-grade system organizes men into groups with defined communal responsibilities:

- Egbonughele
- Eghene
- Edion N'Enen

The most senior of these elders, known as the Odionwele (oldest indigenous man), presides over the council and is accorded special authority.

This structure, found in both Idimu Odeva and Idigun and further embedded within their Idumhuns, provides the framework for governance, dispute resolution, and land management in Amedokhian.

== Cultural identity and occupation ==
Oral history describes Amedeokhian as a community of warriors, healers, farmers and blacksmiths. Oral history recognizes them as defenders of their territory and preservers of indigenous knowledge.

== Educational institutions ==
The community is served by several educational institutions, which support literacy and technical development:

- Amedokhian Primary School
- Idigun Primary School
- Ikeken Primary School
- Amedokhian Secondary School
- National Institute of Construction Technology and Management (NICTM) – a federal institution that offers technical and managerial training in construction and engineering.

== Developmental needs and infrastructure priorities ==
While Amedokhian has continued to contribute culturally and intellectually to the region, it faces several development challenges:

- The community lacks reliable water infrastructure.
- Despite being a growing community, Amedokhian lacks adequate commercial infrastructure, although some filling stations are present and serve the area's transportation and trade needs.
- The community is also served by a maternity center, providing essential maternal and child health services to residents.

== Notable personalities ==
Amedokhian has produced individuals who have served Edo State and Nigeria with distinction:

- Chief Michael A. Ojomoh – Community elder, philanthropist and public figure
- Hon. Friday Itulah – Former Member of the House of Representatives

== Contemporary challenges and outlook ==
In recent years, Amedokhian has faced growing security concerns, including occasional incidents of kidnappings—issues not uncommon in rural communities across Edo State. These threats have prompted calls from the Nigeria Government for improved security infrastructure and government presence in the area.

On October 8, 2025 Ex-Edo Deputy Speaker, Oligbi-Edeko inaugurates Ultra-Modern Amedokhian Divisional Police Station in Uromi. The inauguration marked the elevation of the police station to a divisional headquarters, expanding its operational capacity and enhancing security coverage in the town and surrounding areas.
