= James Oladipo Williams =

Nigerian lawyer (1975-1999)

- Born: Lagos State, Nigeria
- Occupations: jurist; solicitor; activist
- Years active: 1 June 1975 – 14 February 1998
- Spouse: Henrietta Aina Williams
- Children: Ayotunde Phillips and Oluwafunmilayo Olajumoke Atilade (daughters)

James Oladipo Williams was a Nigerian jurist and former judge at the High Court of Lagos State. He became a judge at the Lagos High Court on 1 June 1975, during the Military era and retired from service on 22 May 1987. He is the father of Ayotunde Phillips and Oluwafunmilayo Olajumoke Atilade, the 14th and 15th Chief Judge of Lagos State respectively.
