= Funmilayo Atilade =

Nigerian lawyer and judge (born 1952)

Chief Judge of Lagos State
- In office 20 August 2014 – 24 September 2017
- Preceded by: Ayotunde Phillips
- Succeeded by: Opeyemi Oke

Personal details
- Born: Oluwafunmilayo Olajumoke Atilade; 24 September 1952 (age 73) London, UK

Oluwafunmilayo Olajumoke "Funmilayo" Atilade (née Williams; born 24 September 1952), is a Nigerian Jurist and former Chief Judge of Lagos State. She was formerly a judge at the High Court of Lagos State.

== Background ==
Oluwafunmilayo Olajumoke Williams was born on 24 September 1952 in London to the late Justice James Oladipo Williams and Henrietta Aina Williams, a Nigeria-born judge.

She earned the West Africa School Certificate Examination at Anglican Girls Grammar School in Surulere, a metropolitan city of Lagos. She obtained a bachelor's degree in Law from the University of Lagos in 1975 and was Call to the bar in 1976. She completed the compulsory one year Youth Service at the Ministry of Justice in Benin city.

== Law career ==
She started her law career in 1977 at the Federal Ministry of Justice as a State Counsel. She later joined the services of the Nigerian Ports Authority as a senior legal officer in 1979. Having worked for three years at the Nigerian Ports Authority she was deployed to the Lagos State Judiciary as Senior Magistrate before she later became Chief Magistrate Admin at Apapa Magistrate court. In July 1996, she was appointed Judge of the High Court of Lagos under the administration of the military administrator, Mohammed Buba Marwa.

On 20 August 2015, she was appointed as Chief Judge by Babatunde Fashola, the Governor of Lagos State to succeed her sister Ayotunde Phillips. Atilade is the 5th Lagos female Chief Judge.
