= Inumidun Akande =

Nigerian lawyer (born 1947)

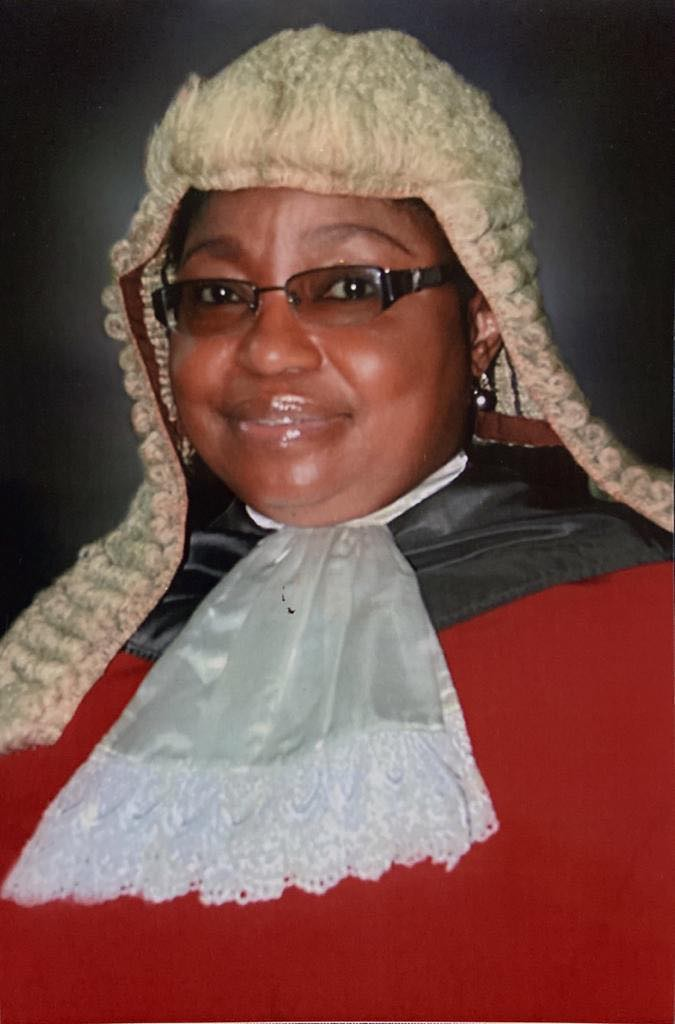
- Judge Inimidun Akande

Chief Judge of Lagos State
- In office 8 August 2009 – 10 June 2012
- Preceded by: Augustine Alabi
- Succeeded by: Ayotunde Phillips

Personal details
- Born: 10 June 1947 (age 79)

Inumidun Akande (born 10 June 1947) is a Nigerian jurist and former Chief Judge of Lagos State.

== Early life ==
She attended Holy Trinity Primary School at Ebute Ero, a metropolitan city of Lagos State southwestern Nigeria before she proceeded to Ijebu Ode Grammar School, Ogun State, Nigeria, where she obtained the West Africa School Certificate in 1966. She received a bachelor's degree in Law from the University of Lagos in 1970. She graduated from the Nigerian Law School in 1971 and was Call to the bar on June 16, 1971.

== Law career ==
She joined the Lagos State Judiciary in the early 1970s and served at the Ministry of Justice as Director of Legislative Drafting, before she got transferred to the National Assembly, Lagos as Assistant Chief Legal Draftsman in 1983. She was appointed to the Lagos bench on August 8, 1989. She was appointed Chief Judge of Lagos State on September 8, 2009, two years after Babatunde Fashola, the Lagos State Governor assumed office. Inumidun retired from service on June 10, 2012, at the age of 65 and was succeeded by Ayotunde Phillips, the 14th Chief Judge of Lagos State.
