= NADECO =

NADECO may stand for:

- National Democratic Convention (South Africa)
- National Democratic Coalition, Nigeria
