= Ijebu Ode Grammar School =

Secondary school in Ijebu Ode, Ogun State, Nigeria

Coordinates: 6°49′34″N 3°54′43″E

Information
- Established: 1913; 113 years ago
- Gender: Boys
- Houses: Gansallo; Johnson; Kuti; Odumosu; Phillips; School

Ijebu Ode Grammar School (JOGS) is a boys-only secondary school located in Ijebu Ode local government area of Ogun State, South-Western Nigeria. Founded on 20 January 1913, the school is one of the oldest schools in Nigeria.

== Houses ==
- Gansallo (Blue) House
- Johnson (Red) House
- Kuti (Grey) House
- Odumosu (Green) House
- Phillips (Yellow) House
- School (Purple) House

== Notable alumni ==
- Abraham Adesanya, Nigerian lawyer and activist
- Inumidun Akande, former Chief Judge of Lagos State
- Mobolaji Bank Anthony, former council President of the Lagos Stock Exchange
- Deji Ashiru, Nigerian engineer and the MD/CEO of Ogun-Osun River Basin Development Authority
- George Ashiru, Taekwondo grandmaster
- Harold Demuren, Nigerian aeronautic engineer
- Bode George, Nigerian Politician and former Military Governor
- Seth Kale, former Bishop of Lagos
- Adeleke Mamora, current Minister of State for Health
- Omololu Meroyi, former senator of Ondo South constituency
- Adeola Odutola, Nigerian business mogul
- Olu Oyesanya, Nigerian journalist
- Vector, rapper and musician
- Wizkid, musician

== Notable faculty ==
- Israel Oludotun Ransome-Kuti

== Old Students Association ==
Ijebu-Ode Grammar School has an Old Students Association called JOGSOBA (Jebu-Ode Grammar School Old Boys Association)
