= National Democratic Convention =

The phrase "National Democratic Convention" may refer to either of

- National Democratic Convention (South Africa), a political party in South Africa
- Democratic National Convention, a presidential nominating convention held every four years by the Democratic party of the United States

== See also ==
- National Democratic Coalition (Nigeria)
