= Ayo Opadokun =

Nigerian lawyer, activist and author (born 1948)

Ayo Opadokun CON
- Born: Pa Ayo Opadokun; 26 August 1948 (age 78); Offa, Nigeria
- Occupations: Lawyer, activist, author

Pa Ayo Opadokun CON (born 26 August 1948) is a Nigerian lawyer, activist, and author. He is a former Secretary-General and National Publicity Secretary of the National Democratic Coalition (NADECO), one of the groups that campaigned against military rule in Nigeria and advocated for the validation of the 12 June 1993 presidential election.

== Early life and education ==
Opadokun was born on 26 August 1948, in Offa, Nigeria. He attended Baptist Day School, Zaria, where he completed his primary education in 1961. He later attended Nigerian Baptist College, Minna, graduating in 1972 and his Bachelor of Science (B.Sc.) degree fron University of Lagos, where he obtained a Bachelor of Laws (LL.B.) degree in 1979.

== Career ==
Opadokun served as an Assistant Director of the Unity Party of Nigeria (UPN) during the Second Republic. After the annulment of the 1993 presidential election, he became a leading member of the National Democratic Coalition (NADECO) and served as its National Secretary and later Secretary-General.

Opadokun was detained by the then military regime during the pro-democracy struggle and later documented his experiences in his writings. Opadokun also served as Secretary-General of Afenifere, the pan-Yoruba socio-political organisation.

=== Politics and public service ===
During the Second Nigerian Republic, Opadokun served as an Assistant Director of the Unity Party of Nigeria (UPN). He later became actively involved in Nigeria's pro-democracy movement following the annulment of the 1993 presidential election won by Moshood Kashimawo Olawale Abiola.

=== Pro-democracy activism ===
Opadokun has consistently advocated restructuring and true federalism in Nigeria, arguing that prolonged military intervention hindered the country's development.

== Honours and recognition ==
During the 2026 Democracy Day celebrations, President Bola Ahmed Tinubu conferred the national honour of Commander of the Order of the Niger (CON) on Opadokun in recognition of his contributions to Nigeria's pro-democracy movement and democratic development.

== Writings ==
- Freedom Jail: The Traumatic Experience of Ayo Opadokun (1999).
- Prison Memoirs (2000)
- The Gun Hegemony: An Unusual Chronicle About the Nigerian Military (2025)
- The NADECO Story (2026)
