= Agba Nojie of Uromi =

Agba N'Ojie
- Onojie of Uromi
- Reign: 1483 - 1507
- Predecessor: Ijesan
- Successor: Ikenoa
- Born: Uromi
- Father: Ijesan

Agba N'Ojie (lit. 'God of War' in the Esan language) of Uromi, originally called Agba, was the ruler of the Esan people from 1483 AD until 1507 AD. Considered an important Onojie ('king' or 'monarch') in the history of the Esan people, he was instrumental in maintaining the independence of Esanland from the old Benin Empire.

He stopped tributes from Enijies in Esanland from being paid to the Oba of Benin and prevented appeal cases being taken from Esanland to the Oba's Palace for retrial during the time of Ozolua n'Ibarmoi ('Ozolua the Conqueror').

== History ==
Ahojie Bush

Agba N'Ojie inherited the Uromi throne after the death of his father Onojie Ijesan, the first Onojie of Uromi. He wanted to free his kin from the control of the old Benin Empire. The general population of Esan kingdoms initially relocated from Benin City during the rule of Oba Ewuare.

These small settlements extended through interior development and recorded movements from Benin around five centuries ago. Such movements into the zone may have occurred before this date.

They were driven by ousted sovereigns, bosses, culprits and others who had abandoned Benin City for the uninhabited woodland before Ewuare's reign as the Oba started in 1460. This followed the cataclysmic common wars over succession.

The recorded relocation out of Benin City occurred amid Oba Ewuare's reign in the fifteenth century when the Oba lost his two children and developed laws restricting subjects over extended periods of time, from cooking, washing, or having intercourse. Oba needed to use discretion to bring them under Benin's dominion.

He welcomed Esan pioneers or their agents to Benin for a détente. He was prepared to perceive and respect his guests with the title of Onojie (which means king). There is no record of any individuals who received the invitation and disregarded it.

They have vanished from history. For the future, Esan laid on the individuals who went to Benin and took the title of Onojie. Agba's father was one of the pioneers initiated by Oba Ewuare in 1463 as the first Onojie of Uromi. At the time when Agba assumed control over the position as the Onojie after the passing of his father, Onojie Ijesan found the way Oba Ewuare used discretion and manipulations to bring the Esan people under the Bini control, choosing to end the Bini control over the Esan people.

When Oba Ozolua extended a hand of friendship to Agba Nojie of Uromi, King Agba of Uromi, refused the friendship with the Oba, saying it was not an honest friendship. This resulted in a war that was declared between the two generals, Oba Ozolua of Benin and Onojie Agba Nojie of Uromi.‍–‍Esan War.

== Bini‍–‍Esan War ==
During the 16th century, the Uzea War, which is also known as the Bini–Esan War, occurred between the Uromi kingdom and the Kingdom of Benin.

The war lasted for many years due to a refusal of friendship from Oba Ozolua of Benin by Onojie Agba N'ojie of Uromi.

The people of Esan defined him as a God of War and he is worshipped today under a tall kapok tree.

A peace treaty was signed between the Esans and the Binis, which the Esans call Ukoven. This was done and sealed by planting the Ohimi tree and pledging the Ohimi oath, "Esan I Gbedo...", which is known today as Esan Igbe Edo meaning Esans will no longer attack Binis.

Esan kingdoms would loan soldiers to the Benin Kingdom, such as during the Idah War of 1515−1516, and on three occasions when some Obas of Benin were denied their throne, they ran to Esanland and were led by Esan warriors back to Benin to reclaim their throne as Oba. An example of this is Oba Osemwende (1816–1848).

== Death and legacy ==
Agba N'Ojie Shrine

Agba N'Ojie of Uromi's exact date of death was never confirmed because he vanished into Ahojie bush in Uromi and was never seen again.

Alu-Agba is considered a deity—a god of war–by the Esan people. His shrine is under a tall Ceiba pentandra, or kapok, tree, where he is worshipped on every Uromi market day. They believe Agba N'Ojie has the power to protect them during war and hard times.

== See also ==
- Ogbidi Okojie
