= Peter Enahoro =

Nigerian journalist (1935–2023)

- Born: Peter Osajele Aizegbeobor Enahoro; 21 January 1935; Uromi, Edo State, British Nigeria
- Died: 24 April 2023 (aged 88); London, England
- Other name: Peter Pan
- Education: Government College, Ughelli
- Occupation: Journalist
- Notable work: How To Be A Nigerian (1966)
- Spouse: Susanne Maria Elisabeth Enahoro (née Haupt)
- Relatives: Ogbidi Okojie (maternal grandfather); Anthony Enahoro (brother)

Peter Osajele Aizegbeobor Enahoro (21 January 1935 – 24 April 2023) was a Nigerian journalist, author, businessman and publisher. Also known by the pen name of "Peter Pan" because of his popular column in New African magazine under that name. He has been described as "perhaps Africa's best known international journalist".

== Early life and education ==
Peter Osajele Aizegbeobor Enahoro was born on 21 January 1935 to a political family in Uromi, Edo State, Nigeria. His Esan parents were educator Asuelimen Okotako Enahoro and Princess Inibokun (née Okojie). His maternal grandfather was the Onogie of Uromi, Ogbidi Okojie. His eldest brother was a statesman and politician, Chief Anthony Enahoro. Peter was one of ten siblings. He had a stint at St. Stephens Elementary School, Akure (Ondo State); CMS Primary School, Ado-Ekiti (Ondo State); Government School, Ekpoma (Edo State), St. David's School, Akure (Ondo State), Government School, Warri (Delta State), before graduating from Government College, Ughelli (Delta State) in 1948.

== Career ==
Enahoro started his career in media as an Assistant Publicity Officer, Department now Federal Ministry of Information, 1954. He joined Daily Times as a sub-editor in 1955, at the age of 20, before moving on to serve as Assistant District Manager at Rediffusion Services, Ibadan, in 1957. He became the Editor of the Nigerian Sunday Times in 1958 at the age of 23, and Features Editor of the Daily Times in 1958, then the paper's Editor in 1962, going on to become the Daily Times Group Editorial Adviser in 1965, and in 1966 editor-in-chief of the Daily Times, succeeding Babatunde Jose.

In the 1960s, Enahoro went into a self-imposed exile that would last for 13 years. He was Contributing Editor of Radio Deutsche Welle in Cologne, Germany, from 1966 to 1976, and was Africa Editor of National Zeitung, in Basel, Switzerland, becoming editorial director of New African magazine in London, England, in 1978.

In 1981, he launched a pan-African news magazine called Africa Now. He became Sole Administrator of Daily Times Nigeria Plc in 1996. Frank Barton in his book The Press of Africa (Macmillan Press Ltd) described Enahoro as "arguably Africa's best journalist writing in the English language".

== Self-exile ==
In an interview with Anote Ajeluorou of the Vanguard Saturday Magazine, Enahoro acknowledged fleeing Nigeria, aged 31, in the 1960s. This was unconnected to the 1966 Civil War. He first returned in 1979, before leaving again. In 1990, he returned but was "unable to settle down".

== Death ==
Enahoro died in London on 24 April 2023, at the age of 88.

== Publications ==
- How to be a Nigerian (1966)
- You Gotta Cry to Laugh (1972)
- The Complete Nigerian (1992)
- Then Spoke the Thunder (2009)
