= Ayotunde Phillips =

Nigerian jurist

Ayotunde Ayomide Phillips

Chief Judge of Lagos State
- In office 10 June 2012 – 26 July 2014
- Preceded by: Inumidun Akande
- Succeeded by: Oluwafunmilayo Olajumoke Atilade

Personal details
- Born: Ayotunde Adeyoola Williams; 26 July 1949 (age 76) London, UK

Ayotunde Ayomide Phillips (born 26 July 1949) is a Nigerian jurist and former Chief Judge of Lagos State.

== Early life ==
Ayotunde Ayomide Williams was born on 26 July 1949, in London, the first child of the late Justice James Oladipo Williams and Henrietta Aina Williams, a Nigeria-born judge. She attended primary school in London before returning to Nigeria with her sibling, Oluwafunmilayo Olajumoke Atilade. She obtained the West Africa School Certificate Examination at Queen's College, Lagos, and Ibadan Grammar School before proceeding to the University of Lagos where she obtained a bachelor's degree in Law in June 1973. She completed the compulsory one year Youth Service at Enugu State Ministry of Justice and was Call to the bar in 1974.

== Law career ==
She started her career at Kehinde Sofola's Chambers in November 1975, a year after she was Call to the bar. She left the chamber in September 1976 to join the services of the Lagos State Development and Property Corporation as a legal Officer and rose to the position of legal adviser in 1990, the same year she got a transfer to the Ministry of Justice where she attained the rank of a High Court Judge in 1994.

In July 2012, she was appointed as the Chief Judge by Babatunde Fashola and after her retirement in June 2014, she was succeeded by Justice Oluwafunmilayo Olajumoke Atilade, her younger sister.
