= Ayo Adebanjo =

Nigerian lawyer and nationalist (1928–2025)

Ayo Adebanjo (10 April 1928 – 14 February 2025) was a Nigerian lawyer, nationalist and co-founder of Afenifere.

== Early life and education ==
Adebanjo was born in Ijebu Ogbu Oke, now in Odogbolu Local Government Area of Ogun State, in British-ruled Nigeria to Chief Joel Adedairo Adebanjo and Salawatu Anomo Adebanjo. He started his education at Saint Saviours Primary School, Elegbaata in Lagos, between 1934 and 1935. From 1937 to 1941, he was schooled at Holy Trinity School, Ebute Ero, and proceeded to Cathedral School in Lagos till 1943. His early career included journalism and a brief stint at the Ministry of Health, where he was dismissed for participating in pro-independence protests.

He enrolled at the Council of Legal Education and was called to the English Bar at Lincoln's Inn in 1961. He then returned to Nigeria to join the chambers of Chief Obafemi Awolowo.

== Political career ==
Adebanjo was a founding member of Action Group( Egbe Afenifere) established in 1951 in Ibadan, just before the Regional election. Afenifere was again reinvented in 1989. The group emerged from the legacy of the Action Group, a political party founded by Awolowo in 1951, and became a key advocate for progressive ideology. interests and democratic reforms.

As Afenifere’s leader, Adebanjo campaigned for restructuring Nigeria into a federal state, arguing that centralized governance exacerbated ethnic tensions and economic disparities. His tenure saw internal factionalism, including a 2025 dispute where a rival Afenifere faction declared his removal as leader.

Afenifere under Adebanjo opposed military rule, supported the National Democratic Coalition (NADECO) during Nigeria’s pro-democracy struggles, and endorsed Peter Obi of the Labour Party in the 2023 Nigerian presidential election.

== Personal life and death ==
Adebanjo was married to Chief Christy Ayo-Adebanjo for over 60 years, and had children, grandchildren, and great-grandchildren. He died at his Lekki, Lagos residence on 14 February 2025, at the age of 96.

== See also ==
- Edwin Kiagbodo Clark
