= Afolabi Fatai Adeyinka =

Nigerian jurist and Chief Judge of Lagos State

Hon. Justice Afolabi Fatai Adeyinka

Chief Judge of Lagos State
- In office 8 March 2004 – 2 July 2004
- Preceded by: Ibitola Adebisi Sotuminu
- Succeeded by: Augustine Adetula Alabi

Personal details
- Born: 2 July 1939 Ikorodu, Lagos State, Nigeria
- Died: 27 January 2022 (aged 82)
- Education: Holborn College, London

Afolabi Fatai Adeyinka was a Nigerian jurist who served as the Chief Judge of Lagos State. He also previously served as a judge of the High Court of Lagos State and Chairman of the Lagos State Independent Electoral Commission (LASIEC).

== Background ==
Afolabi Fatai Adeyinka was born on 2 July 1939 in Ikorodu, Lagos State. He attended Ereko Methodist School and Anwar-ul-Islam College all in Lagos for his primary education and secondary education, respectively.

He studied law at Holborn College of Law in London and returned to Nigeria, where he was called to the Bar in 1969.

== Law career ==
Adeyinka had a short stint at the Federal Ministry of Education before entering the legal profession. He worked in private legal practice from 1969 to 1986 and was appointed as a Judge of the High Court of Lagos State on 11 February 1986.

On 8 March 2004, he was sworn in as the 11th Chief Judge of Lagos State by the then Governor Bola Tinubu, succeeding Justice Ibitola Adebisi Sotuminu. His tenure as Chief Judge was brief, as he reached the mandatory retirement age of 65, 116 days into his tenure.

Following his retirement from the judiciary, he was appointed as the Chairman of the Lagos State Independent Electoral Commission (LASIEC).

He died at the age of 82 on 27 January 2022.
