= Christopher Olatunde Segun =

Nigerian jurist and Chief Judge of Lagos State

Chief Judge of Lagos State
- In office 24 May 1999 – 25 May 2001
- Preceded by: Samuel Omotunde Ilori
- Succeeded by: Ibitola Adebisi Sotuminu

Personal details
- Died: 16 March 2019 Lagos State, Nigeria
- Education: Studied law in the United Kingdom

Christopher Olatunde Segun was a Nigerian jurist who served as the Chief Judge of Lagos State between May 1999 and May 2001. After leaving the bench, he was appointed Chairman of the Lagos State Independent Electoral Commission (LASIEC).

== Background ==
Segun was born in Lagos State, Nigeria. Records show that he studied law in the United Kingdom and was called to the English Bar before returning to Nigeria to practise.

== Judicial career ==
He joined the Nigerian judiciary in the late 1960s and advanced through different positions over several decades. On 24 May 1999, he was appointed Chief Judge of Lagos State, succeeding Samuel Omotunde Ilori. During his period in office, he introduced reforms such as practice directions that reorganised the High Court into specialised divisions from 1 May 2001. He stepped down on 25 May 2001 and was succeeded by Ibitola Adebisi Sotuminu.

== Post-judicial career ==
Segun later served as Chairman of LASIEC from January 2002 to May 2007, overseeing electoral processes in Lagos State. He also represented the commission in international election observation missions including assignments in the United States.

== Legacy ==
In December 2019, the Lagos State Government commissioned a court complex in Eti-Osa (Ajah-Badore) named the Christopher Olatunde Segun Courthouse. Legal practitioners described him as a respected jurist noted for his role in improving case assignment and judicial independence.

== Death ==
Segun died on 16 March 2019 at the age of 86. A valedictory court session was held in his honour, attended by members of the judiciary and government officials.
