= Edwin Clark (politician) =

Nigerian politician (1927–2025)

- Born: 25 May 1927; Ijaw area, Colony and Protectorate of Nigeria
- Died: 17 February 2025 (aged 97)
- Occupation: Politician
- Political party: National Council of Nigerian Citizens

Chief Edwin Clark, CFR CON (25 May 1927 – 17 February 2025) was a Nigerian Ijaw leader and politician from Delta State who worked with the administrations of the military governor Samuel Ogbemudia and head of state, General Yakubu Gowon between 1966 and 1975. In 1966, he was a member of an advisory committee to the military governor of the Mid-Western Region, David Ejoor and was appointed Federal Commissioner of Information in 1975.

Clark was an unofficial adviser to President Goodluck Jonathan. He was a philanthropist who founded the Edwin Clark Foundation and established a university in his hometown.

== Life and career ==
Clark was born in Kiagbodo, in the Ijaw area of what is now Delta State. He attended primary and secondary schools at Effurun, Okrika and Afugbene before completing further studies at the Government Teacher Training College, which later became Delta State University, Abraka. Thereafter, Clark worked briefly as a schoolteacher before travelling to the United Kingdom to earn a law degree.

The poet J.P. Clark was his brother. They were both the great-grandsons of the colonial-era Ijaw aristocrat Bekederemo of Kiagbodo.

=== Politics ===
Clark's involvement in the political process began during the pre-independence period when he was elected as Councillor for Bomadi in 1953. Clark later joined National Council of Nigeria and the Cameroons (NCNC).

He was later appointed Midwestern Commissioner of Education and later, Finance from 1966 to 1975.

During the second republic, he was a member of the national executive committee of the National Party of Nigeria (NPN) and the treasurer of the party in Bendel State (now, in part, Delta State and previously the Mid-Western Region province). In 1983, he was an elected senator for three months at the twilight of the Shagari administration.

Beginning in 1996, Clark was a self-described leader of the Ijaw nation. He supported the Ijaw ethnic group in Delta State during an ethnic crisis in Warri and led Ijaw leadership delegations to meet political leaders.

=== Other achievements ===
Clark was the founder of Edwin Clark University which was established in 2015.

In 2016, Clark founded the Pan Niger Delta Forum (PANDEF) along with other leaders. The organization's stated objective is "to dialogue with stakeholders and lobby for increased attention and implementation of restructuring, development and security policies by the Government of Nigeria."

== Death ==
Clark died on February 17, 2025, at the age of 97. Former president of Nigeria Olusegun Obasanjo described Clark as a “great brother, friend, a frontline lawyer and seasoned economist”.

== See also ==
- Ayo Adebanjo
