= Olu Oyesanya =

Nigerian diplomat, journalist (1923–1999)

Chief Olu Oyesanya (26 April 1923 – 24 October 1999) was a Nigerian journalist and diplomat.

== Early life and education ==
Oyesanya was born on Lagos Island, Lagos State to Simeon Oyesanya Ogunledun of Sagamu, Ogun State and Eunice Irebowale Ogunledun (née Adeeso of Simawa, Ogun State). He attended Tinubu Methodist School, Lagos State from 1932 to 1934. He also attended St. Paul’s School Shagamu and Ijebu Ode Grammar School, Ogun State from 1942 to 1946, where he was made a senior prefect during the tenure of Reverends Efunkoya and Nicholas, and was the captain of the school's first football team.

After completing his secondary education, he worked at the Federal Survey Department as a third class clerk under his boss the late Mr. Ojemuyiwa of Isara-Remo. From there he developed an interest in journalism.

== Career ==
Oyesanya became an Editor of the Daily Service paper (now defunct), and won a Federal Government scholarship in 1952 to further his training in Journalism at the Royal Polytechnic Institution in London (now known as Westminster). After getting his diploma, he trained at the Sunday Pictorial (now Sunday Mirror) in London.

Upon his return to Nigeria, he founded the Nigerian Union of Journalism (NUJ), as he said “For the development of the profession of Journalism in Nigeria”. On 15 March 1954 the inaugural meeting of the NUJ was held at St. Paul’s School, Breadfruit Lagos, Nigeria and a resolution was passed forming the organization. He became the first Secretary in 1955 to 1959.

In March 1955, he was appointed as the Press Officer to the United States Consulate-General in Lagos, Nigeria, and was sent to the State Department in Washington where he undertook an orientation course in Foreign Service and Public Affairs, under the sponsorship of the United States Information Agency. He later became a guest writer on the Minneapolis Star Tribune in Minnesota.

Oyesanya joined the Federal Ministry of Information in 1958, and was posted to the Nigerian High Commission in London to assist in establishing the Department of External Publicity. After accomplishing these tasks, in 1965 he returned to the Ministry of External Affairs in Nigeria.

During the Nigerian Civil War from 1967 to 1970, he was appointed as the Director and Head of Nigerian Information Services in Europe. At the end of the Civil War he was posted back to Nigeria.

In 1976, he was assigned as the Director of Publicity FESTAC ’77, which was the Festival for Arts and Culture held in Nigeria. This was penultimate to his appointment as the Secretary-Registrar and Chief Executive of the Nigerian Press Council in 1979, where he played a principal role in making it acceptable to member organizations. He was eventually awarded the NUJ Gold medal for his contribution to the development of Journalism in Nigeria in 1986.

He was survived by his wife Princess Tanimowo Oyesanya (née Okupe) and his five children.
