= Edwin Clark University =

Private university in Kiagbodo, Nigeria

- Established: 2015
- Founder: Edwin Clark
- Vice-Chancellor: Prof. Samuel Wara
- Location: Kiagbodo, burutu, Delta, Nigeria; 5°22′43″N 5°53′46″E
- Website: edwinclarkuniversity.edu.ng

Edwin Clark University (ECU) is a privately owned university located in Kiagbodo, Delta State, Nigeria. It was approved by the Federal Executive Council of Nigeria in 2015.

== History ==
Chief Edwin K. Clark was the founder of Edwin Clark University. The institution was established in May 2015. It was previously known as Edwin Clark University of Technology but was later changed.

Edwin Clark University was officially approved by the Federal Government of Nigeria through the National Universities Commission (NUC) on 11 May 2015, becoming the 60th private university in Nigeria. Academic activities began later that year on 14 September 2015, marking the start of the institution’s first academic session.

The university is owned by the Edwin Clark Foundation, an educational initiative established in honour of the Nigerian statesman and nationalist, Edwin Kiagbodo Clark. Clark has long been associated with educational development in Nigeria. During his tenure as Commissioner of Education in the former Mid-Western Region in 1968, he played a significant role in the establishment of University of Benin and later served as its first Pro-Chancellor and Chairman of Council.

His commitment to education and development in the Niger Delta inspired the creation of the university. The institution was conceived not only as a center for learning but also as a means of empowering young people in the region through access to quality education and professional training.

== Location and Campus Environment ==
The university is situated in Kiagbodo, a historic town in Burutu Local Government Area of Delta State. The town lies within the coastal mangrove ecosystem of the Niger Delta and is located close to several oil-producing communities.

The location of the university reflects part of its mission: to address developmental and environmental challenges in the Niger Delta. The campus is positioned within a quiet environment that promotes learning and research. According to institutional records, the campus lies roughly between 5.35° and 5.37° north latitude and 5.88° and 5.89° east longitude, at a low elevation typical of the region’s wetland terrain.

The university infrastructure includes lecture halls, laboratories, student hostels, administrative offices, and a hybrid library that combines traditional library services with modern digital resources.

== Philosophy and Educational Vision ==
The philosophy of Edwin Clark University is rooted in the belief that education should produce graduates who are not only academically competent but also morally responsible and socially relevant. Although it is a secular institution, the university operates on faith-based ethical principles that emphasize discipline, integrity, and leadership.

Its academic programmes are designed to promote:

- Entrepreneurship and self-reliance
- Practical and technical skills
- Innovation and creativity
- Social responsibility and community engagement

A notable aspect of the university’s philosophy is its emphasis on regional relevance. Many of its research priorities and academic programmes are tailored to address environmental, economic, and social challenges in the Niger Delta region.

== Faculties and academic programmes ==
The National Universities Commission, NUC, in 2018, after rigorous accreditation, approved the university to run 18 programmes at the institution.

=== Faculty of Humanities, Social and Management Sciences ===
- Accounting
- Banking and Finance
- Business Administration
- Economics
- English and Literary Studies
- History and International Studies
- Mass Communication
- Political Science
- Sociology

=== Faculty of Science ===
- Biochemistry
- Biology
- Chemistry
- Computer Science
- Industrial Chemistry
- Mathematics
- Microbiology
- Physics

=== Faculty of Law ===
- Law (LL.B.)

=== Faculty of Basic Medical Sciences ===
- Nursing Science
- Medical Laboratory Science
- Public Health

== Administration ==
The governance of Edwin Clark University is carried out through the Chancellor, the Governing Council, and the principal officers of the university, including the Vice-Chancellor, Registrar, Bursar, and University Librarian.

=== Chancellor ===
The founder of the university, Chief Edwin Kiagbodo Clark, served as Chancellor from the establishment of the university in 2015.

=== Pro-Chancellor and Governing Council ===
The Governing Council of the university is chaired by the Pro-Chancellor. As of 2024, the Pro-Chancellor and Chairman of the Governing Council is Prof. Oladapo A. Afolabi, a former Head of Service of the Federation of Nigeria.

=== Principal officers ===
Office	Holder
Vice-Chancellor	Engr. Prof. Samuel Tita Wara
Registrar	Mr. Daniel A. Urhibo
Bursar	Chief Olori Magege
University Librarian	Dr. Wisdom Anyim

=== Vice-Chancellors ===
Vice-Chancellor	Tenure
Prof. Timothy O. Olagbemiro	2014 – 2023
Engr. Prof. Samuel Tita Wara	2023 – present

== Convocation ==
Edwin Clark University holds annual convocation ceremonies for the award of undergraduate and postgraduate degrees.

Convocation	Date	Notes
1st	2019	First set of graduating students of the university.
2nd	2020	Degrees awarded across science, arts and social science programmes.
3rd	2021	Included postgraduate diploma and master's degree graduates.
4th	2022	Convocation ceremony held at the university campus in Kiagbodo, Delta State.
5th	2023	Graduates from multiple faculties including law and basic medical sciences.
6th	2024	Latest convocation ceremony of the university.

== Partnerships and collaborations ==
Edwin Clark University maintains collaborations with academic institutions and professional organisations in Nigeria and internationally to promote research, academic exchange and professional training.

The university also works with industry partners and health institutions to support practical training for students in the sciences, law, and social sciences.

To enhance global academic exposure, the university maintains partnerships with international institutions. These collaborations facilitate student exchange programmes, joint research projects, and academic cooperation.

Partner institutions include:

- Coventry University
- Chicago State University
- Reinhardt University

Through such partnerships, students may participate in exchange programmes and gain international academic exposure.

== Rankings ==
According to the 2025 EduRank university rankings, Edwin Clark University is ranked:

- 128th in Nigeria
- 736th in Africa
- 12,309th in the world

The EduRank ranking is based on research output, non-academic prominence, and the impact of notable alumni.
