= Princess Asha Okojie =

Personal details
- Born: Uromi, Edo State, Nigeria
- Education: Ebenezer Primary School | Adesuwa Grammar School
- Alma mater: Southern New Hampshire University
- Occupation: Politician

Princess Asha Okojie (also known as Asha Okojie-Odigie) is a Nigerian politician and public affairs advocate. She is affiliated with the Labour Party and was a governorship aspirant in the 2024 Edo State gubernatorial election.

== Early life and background ==
Princess Asha Okojie is a native of Uromi in Edo State, Nigeria. She is from the Okojie family, a lineage associated with traditional authority and political participation in the region. Her father, Prince Albert Okojie, was a prominent political figure and a founding member of the Action Congress.

== Education ==
Okojie began her educational journey at Ebenezer Primary School and later attended Adesuwa Grammar School, both in Benin City, Edo State.

She continued her education in the United States, where she earned a Bachelor of Science degree in Health Information Management and a Master of Business Administration (MBA) from Southern New Hampshire University.

== Career ==
Okojie has built a career across media, consulting, and public engagement. Her work has included involvement in foreign direct investment initiatives and diaspora relations. She has also contributed to civil society efforts focused on governance, economic development, and institutional collaboration.

In politics, she is affiliated with the Labour Party and emerged as a governorship aspirant in the Edo State 2024 election. Her campaign emphasized inclusive governance, transparency, and grassroots participation.

She later withdrew from the race and endorsed another candidate.
