= Ibitola Adebisi Sotuminu =

Nigerian jurist and former Chief Judge of Lagos State

Hon. Justice Ibitola Adebisi Sotuminu

Chief Judge of Lagos State
- In office May 28, 2001 – May 5, 2004
- Preceded by: Christopher Olatunde Segun
- Succeeded by: Afolabi Fatai Adeyinka

Personal details
- Born: March 19, 1940 Lagos State, Nigeria
- Died: April 10, 2025
- Education: Inns of Court School of Law, London
- Awards: Officer of the Order of the Niger (OON)

Ibitola Adebisi Sotuminu (née Williams; March 19, 1940 – April 10, 2025) was a Nigerian jurist who served as the Chief Judge of Lagos State from 2001 to 2004. She was the first woman to hold several senior positions in the Lagos State Judiciary and was honoured with the Officer of the Order of the Niger (OON) for her service.

== Early life and education ==
Ibitola Adebisi Sotuminu was born on March 19, 1940, in Lagos State, Nigeria. She attended Girls' Seminary on Broad Street and Our Lady of Apostles Girls Secondary School in Lagos for her primary and secondary education and later studied law at the Inns of Court School of Law in London where she was called to the Bar.

== Judicial career ==
Sotuminu began her career in the Lagos State Judiciary as a magistrate in 1969 and was subsequently promoted to Chief Magistrate. In 1984, she became the first woman appointed Chief Registrar of the Lagos State High Court.

She was elevated to the High Court bench in February 1986. Sotuminu was appointed Chief Judge of Lagos State on May 28, 2001, succeeding Christopher Olatunde Segun and served in that role until May 5, 2004. During her tenure, she initiated various reforms aimed at improving court infrastructure and justice delivery processes.

== Awards and honours ==
Sotuminu was conferred with the Officer of the Order of the Niger (OON) in recognition of her contributions to the Nigerian judiciary.

== Death ==
Ibitola Adebisi Sotuminu died on April 10, 2025, at the age of 86. Following her death, President Bola Ahmed Tinubu extended condolences to her family and colleagues, noting her service to the judiciary and legal profession.
