= Oladapo Ashiru =

Nigerian endocrinologist and academic

Oladapo Adenrele Ashiru is a Nigerian reproductive endocrinologist, academic, and medical researcher known for his work in assisted reproductive technology in Africa. He is the current Secretary-General of the International Federation of Fertility Societies (IFFS). Ashiru is also the foundation President and current Treasurer of the Academy of Medical Sciences, and President of the Africa Reproductive Care Society Foundation.

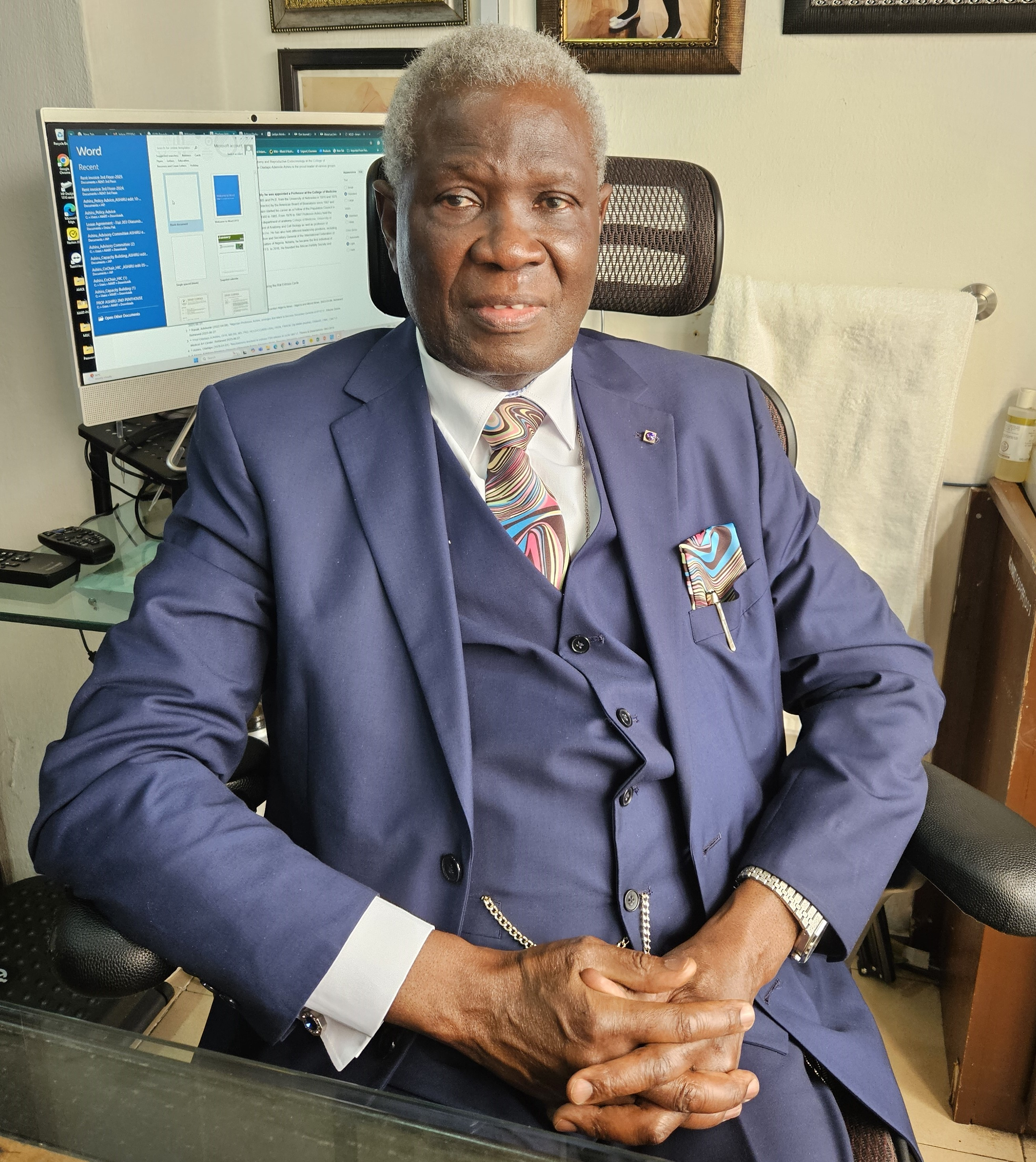

== Early life and education ==
Oladapo Ashiru born in Ijebu Ode, Ogun State, Nigeria to Simeon Adeyemi Ashiru and Janet Solabomi Ashiru on the 3rd of November 1950.

Professor Ashiru obtained his MB, BS from the University of Lagos in 1974. He proceeded to the University of Nebraska–Lincoln in the United States, where he earned an MS in 1978 and a PhD in 1979. He holds the High Complexity Clinical Laboratory Director (HCLD) certification from the American Board of Bioanalysis (1997), and Clinical Consultant (CC) status from ABB-USA (2012). He is a Fellow of the Anatomical Society for Nigeria (FASN), the Nigerian Society of Endocrinology and Metabolism (FNSEM), the Academy of Medicine Specialties of Nigeria (FAcadMedS), and holds a Diploma in Modern Mayr Medicine from Austria.

== Research ==
Oladapo Ashiru has written and reported on various topics such as.

- Hormones
- Detoxification
- Reproductive Gametes
- Reproduction

== Publications ==
- Synopsis of Neuroanatomy
- Mechanisms Involved in Estrous FSH Release in Cyclic Rats
- Mechanisms Regulating Pituitary Follicle-stimulating Hormone During the Rat Estrous Cycle
- Man Know Thyself and You Shall Obtain the Healing Power
