= Opeyemi Oke =

Nigerian judge

Opeyemi Olufunmilayo Oke

Chief Judge of Lagos State
- In office 25 September 2017 – 10 June 2019
- Preceded by: Oluwafunmilayo Olajumoke Atilade
- Succeeded by: Kazeem Alogba

Personal details
- Born: 10 June 1954 (age 71)

Opeyemi Olufunmilayo Oke (born 10 June 1954) is a Nigerian jurist and former chief judge of Lagos State. She was appointed by Governor Akinwunmi Ambode in September 2017 as the 16th chief justice of the state.

== Early life and education ==
Born to parents from Ogun State, Oke had her primary education from Methodist Primary School Surelere and Methodist Primary School, Ekotedo Ibadan. She continued with her secondary studies at University of Ife Staff School Ibadan Campus, before proceeding to Fiwasaiye Anglican Girls’ Grammar School, Akure then concluding her schooling at Olivet Baptist High School, Oyo. Oke is an alumna of University of Ife. Between 1978 and 1979, she attended Nigerian Law School. Then got a master's degree in criminal justice from Coppin State College, Baltimore.

== Career ==
Oke was nominated as chief justice after the retirement of Oluwafunmilayo Olajumoke Atilade. She was subsequently confirmed by the Lagos Assembly, first in acting capacity before being substantively appointed in October 2017.
