= Friday Itulah =

Nigerian politician

Friday Obomezele Itulah is a Nigerian politician, legal practitioner, and former two-time Speaker of the Edo State House of Assembly. He represented the Esan West, Esan Central, and Igueben federal constituency in the House of Representatives. He is a member of the Peoples Democratic Party (PDP). He contested in the 2023 Edo Central Senatorial primaries but lost to Mike Onolememen.
