= Kazeem Alogba =

Nigerian jurist (born 1960)

Chief Judge of Lagos State
- Incumbent
- Assumed office 10 June 2019
- Preceded by: Opeyemi Oke

Personal details
- Born: Kazeem Olanrewaju Alogba; 23 April 1960 (age 66) Lagos Island, Lagos, British Nigeria (now Lagos, Lagos State, Nigeria)

Kazeem Olanrewaju Alogba (born 23 April 1960), is a Nigerian jurist and the present chief judge of Lagos State. He was appointed by Governor Babajide Sanwo-Olu in June 2019 as the 17th chief justice of the state.

== Early life ==
Alogba was born at the Lagos Island Maternity Hospital, Lagos on 23 April 1960 into the Alogba family of Ikorodu, Lagos State to Alhaji Chief Jimoh F. Alogba and Mrs. Risikat Alogba.

He attended the Holy Trinity Primary School, Ebute-Ero, Lagos from 1966 to 1970. He also attended Ikorodu High School, Ikorodu from 1971 to 1975 for his Secondary education, where he obtained his West African School Certificate. He later proceeded to Baptist Academy Shepherdhill, Obanikoro from 1975 to 1977 where he obtained his Higher School Certificate (HSc).

He then proceeded to the University of Lagos (UNILAG), Akoka, Lagos in 1977 and obtained a Second Class (Upper Division) Bachelor of Law in June, 1980. He attended the Nigerian Law School from October 1980 to July, 1981 and was called to the Nigerian Bar in 1981. He also attended the Nigerian Institute of Advanced Legal Studies UNILAG Akoka, where he obtained a Certificate in Advanced Practice and Procedure in 1989. He is currently a member of the Commonwealth Magistrates and Judges Association, and is married with children.

== Judiciary career ==
Alogba was appointed a Judge of the High Court of Lagos State in July 1996. Before his new appointment, he has served the Lagos State Judiciary in various capacities in various Divisions of the High Court of Lagos State. Until his appointment, Justice Alogba was the Administrative Judge (Lagos Judicial Division) for the period, October 2018 to June 2019. Before moving to Lagos Division of the state Judiciary, he was the Administrative Judge (Ikeja Judicial Division) between October 2014 till October 2017. He served as chairman, High Court procedure Rules Review Committee in 2018. In 2016, Justice Alogba was appointed chairman, Bayelsa State Governorship Election Petition Tribunal. He was chairman to the Kebbi State Governorship Election Petition Tribunal in 2016. He was also chairman at the Rivers State House of Assembly Election Petition Tribunal (Panel IV). In 2015, he was appointed chairman, during Lagos Settlement Week, a position he holds to date. His other appointments include member, High Court of Lagos State Civil Procedure Rules Review Committee in 2012. He was chairman, Judicial Commission of Inquiry for Kwande/Ukum Local Government Areas political disturbances, Benue State which sat between May and October, 2004. During the period between 2005 and 2014, he was chairman, Lagos State Hajj Tribunal and member and Lagos State Local government Election Petitions (Appeal Tribunal) in 2009. On 10 June 2019, he was appointed as the acting Chief Judge of Lagos State by Babajide Sanwo-Olu, the Governor of Lagos State. On 20 August 2019 he was confirmed and sworn in as the 17th Chief Judge of Lagos State.
