= Deji Ashiru =

Nigerian engineer and politician

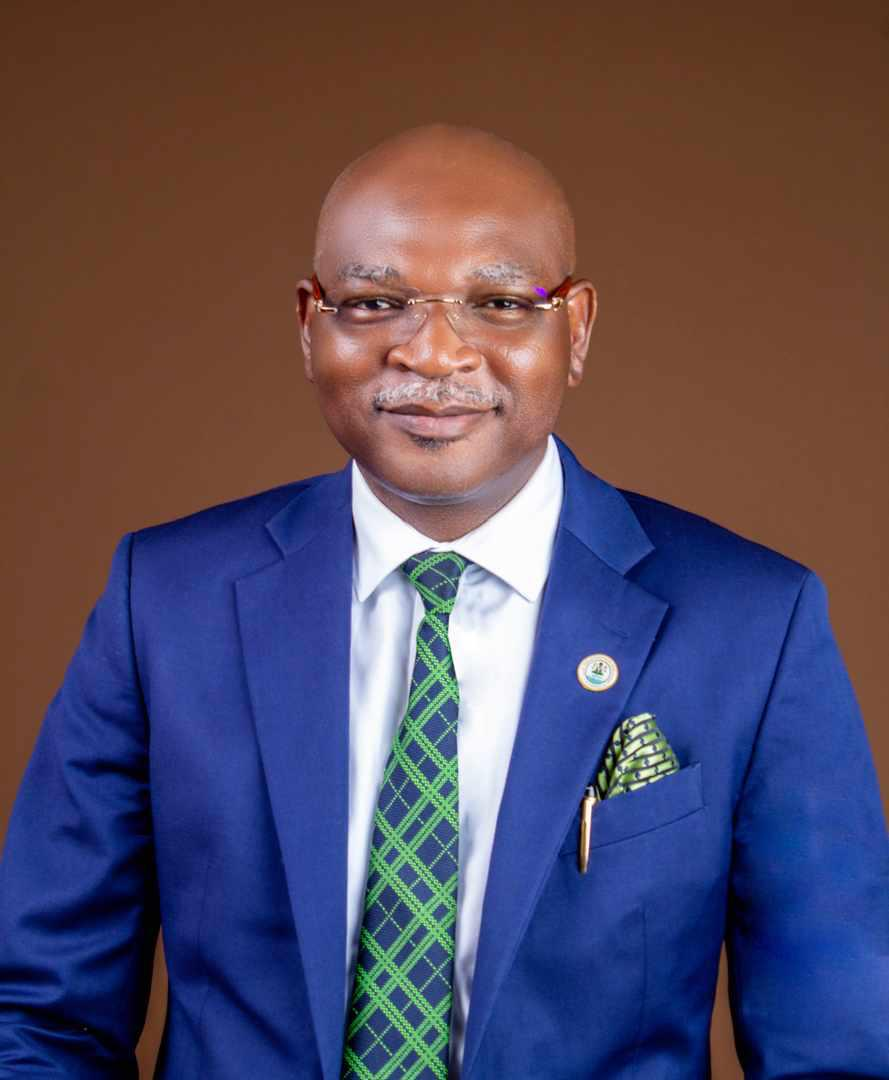

MD/CEO Ogun-Osun River Basin Development Authority (OORBDA)
- Incumbent
- Assumed office 20 May 2024
- President: Bola Tinubu
- Preceded by: Otunba Olufemi Odumosu

Personal details
- Education: Obafemi Awolowo University; Cranfield University; Common Wealth University
- Occupation: Engineer, Politician

Adedeji Ashiru is a Nigerian engineer who is the MD/CEO of Ogun-Osun River Basin Development Authority, a federal agency under the Nigerian Federal Ministry of Water Resources and one of the twelve River Basin Development Authorities (RBDAs) established by the Federal Government of Nigeria under Decrees number 25 of 1976 and 31 of 1977.

== Early life and education ==
Ashiru was born in Ijebu Ode, Ogun State, into the family of Mr Richard Adebisi Ashiru and Mrs Folake Ashiru. He grew up in Ijebu Ode, where he began his education at Precious Stone Primary Mission School and then proceeded to Ijebu Ode Grammar School for his secondary school education. He studied Mechanical Engineering at the Obafemi Awolowo University and graduated in 1997 with a Bachelor of Engineering degree. In 2007, he completed his Master of Science degree in Ocean and Offshore Technology at Cranfield University and a Doctorate in Engineering at the Common Wealth University in 2018.

== Career ==
=== Corporate services ===
Ashiru began his career at ABB Lummus Global in 1996 where he worked on various gas distribution and pipeline projects. He worked for Oando Gas and Power as a senior consultant and then moved to Bolivia Gas Energy Technology Limited between 2003 and 2008 where he served as principal consultant managing various engineering projects and then rose to become the MD/CEO in 2008 which he served until 2014.

In 2015, he co-founded CONTEC Global Energy Limited where he served as Managing Director/CEO up until 2024.

=== Political career ===
Ashiru political career started in 2018 when he contested the Ogun East Senatorial seat on the platform of the African Democratic Party (ADC). He later joined All Progressives Congress in 2019 on the invitation of Dapo Abiodun where he supported his emergence as the governor of Ogun State in 2019. He also ran as All Progressives Congress Senatorial aspirant in 2022.

== Ogun-Osun River Basin Development Authority ==
Ashiru was appointed the MD/CEO of Ogun-Osun River Basin Development Authority (OORBDA) by President Bola Tinubu in May 2024. He replaced Otunba Olufemi Odumosu.

== Personal life ==
He is married to Opeoluwa Ashiru, and they have four children. He is a Christian and an ordained pastor of the Elevation Church and also the Otunba Adegoroye of Ijebu Ososa.
