= Lagos State Judiciary =

The Lagos State Judiciary is one of the three co-equal branches of the Lagos State Government organized under the Constitution of Nigeria and laws of Lagos State. The Chief Judges are appointed by the State Governor with the consent of the House of Assembly.

== Courts ==
The Lagos State courts comprises three levels of courts. The high court is the court of last resort before the Supreme Court of Nigeria. It is generally an appellate court that operates under discretionary review, meaning that the Court can choose which cases to hear, by granting of writs of certiorari. Other levels of court include the Magistrates and the Customary Court. The Lagos state Court has online filling system that makes the process easy.

== Judicial Service Commission ==
The Lagos State Judiciary also consists of a Judicial Service Commission which statutory duties includes the promotion and appointment of judicial staffs as well as other disciplinary function. The Chief Judge serves as the commission's chairman. Other distinguish members of the Judiciary include the Attorney-General of Lagos State Attorney-General and Lagos State Commissioner for Justice|Commissioner for Justice. The Chief Registrar serves as the head of administration and accountant to the judiciary.

== History ==
The Lagos State Judiciary was the first established Judiciary in Nigeria and formerly known as Colony Province Judiciary. Magistrate court was the first to be established among others. It was established before the High court, that was formerly referred to as the Supreme Court but and its jurisdiction was localized. The establishment of the Magistrate court give birth to the High court, the then Lagos State Supreme Court. When the Supreme Court of Nigeria was founded, the Lagos Supreme Court metamorphosed into High Court of the Federal Territory Lagos with concurrent appointment of John Taylor as the Chief judge.

On 27 May 1967, the same year Lagos State was formed, the High Court and the Magistrate Court of the Federal Territory were merged to form the Lagos State Judiciary under the Leadership of John Taylor, the pioneer Chief Judge of Lagos State. Taylor's tenure elapsed on 7 November 1973, and was succeeded by Justice Joseph Adefarasin following his appointment that took effect on 1 November 1974. He served in that capacity for 9 years until 24 April 1985, when is tenure ended. He was succeeded by Justice Candide Ademola Johnson, appointed on 25 April 1985, a day after Justice Joseph left the office. He spent 4 years in office and Justice Ligali Ayorinde succeeded him on 10 July 1989. He served in that capacity for 6 years, between July 1989 to April 1995. In August 2014, Oluwafunmilayo Olajumoke Atilade was appointed as the Chief Judge, sworn in by Ade Ipaye, the Attorney General of Lagos State. She was succeeded by Hon Justice Opeyemi Oke appointed, and thereafter sworn in and confirmed on 20 October 2017 by the then Governor of Lagos state, His excellency Mr Akinwunmi Ambode as the 6th female judge of Lagos state.

In accordance with Section 271 (1) and (4) of the 1999 Constitution of the Federal Republic of Nigeria (as amended), His Excellency Mr. Babajide Olusola Sanwo-Olu, Governor of Lagos State appointed Honourable Justice Kazeem O. Alogba as the 17th Chief Judge of Lagos State with effect from Tuesday 11 June 2019, in acting capacity, pending the recommendation of the National Judicial Council (NJC) and subsequent confirmation of the Lagos State House of Assembly.

In 2020, during the coronavirus pandemic, the Lagos state judiciary held its first virtual court proceedings led by chief judge Kazeen Alogba.

== Restorative justice ==
Restorative justice is an approach to justice where one of the responses to a crime is to organize a meeting between the victim and the offender, sometimes with representatives of the wider community. The goal is for them to share their experience of what happened, to discuss who was harmed by the crime and how, and to create a consensus for what the offender can do to repair the harm from the offense. This may include a payment of money given from the offender to the victim, apologies and other amends, and other actions to compensate those affected and to prevent the offender from causing future harm.

On 30 November 2021, the Lagos State Government affirmed its commitment to the Restorative System of Justice with a pledge to launch a Restorative Justice Centre.
