= High Court of Lagos State =

- Jurisdiction: Lagos State, Nigeria
- Location: Lagos, Nigeria
- Composition method: State High Court
- Authorised by: Constitution of Nigeria

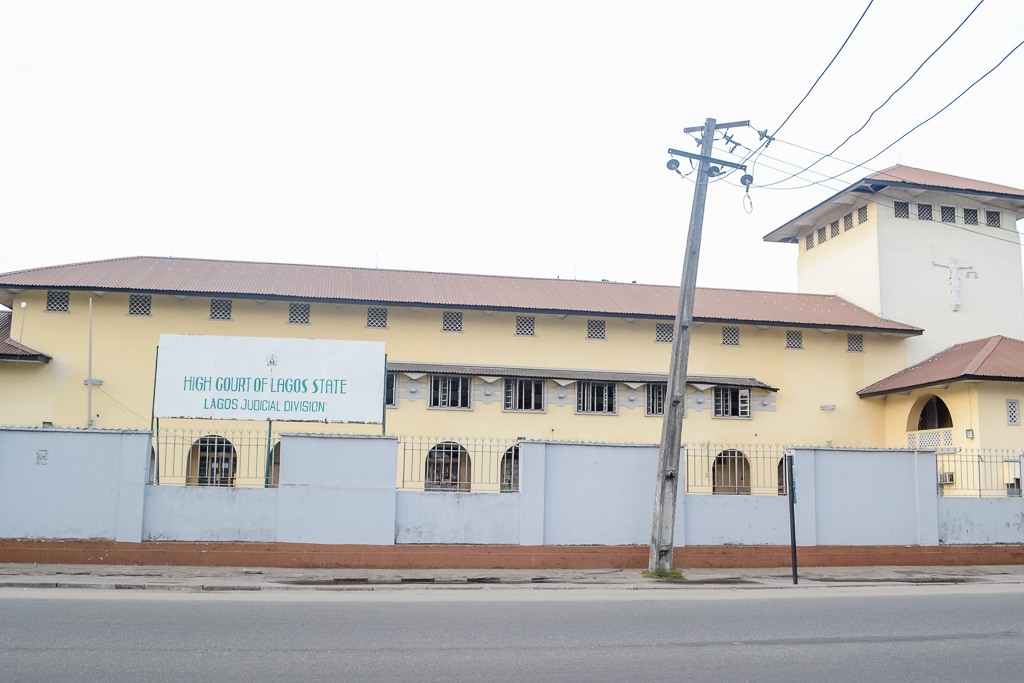
The High Court of Lagos State, Lagos Island

The High Court of Lagos State is the highest state court of law in Lagos State. It has several divisions, including Igbosere, Lagos Island, Ikeja, Epe, Ajah, Badagry, and Ikorodu. the division help making decisions or ruling of cases.

== Judges ==
- The Honourable Justice O.O. Oke (Mrs.) Chief Judge.
- The Honourable Justice K.O. Alogba
- The Honourable Justice D.T. Okuwobi (Mrs.)
- The Honourable Justice Y.O. Idowu (Mrs.)
- The Honourable Justice T. Oyekan-Abdullahi (Mrs.)
- The Honourable Justice G.M. Onyeabo (Mrs.)
- The Honourable Justice O.A. Ipaye (Mrs.)
- The Honourable Justice S.B.A. Candide-Johnson
- The Honourable Justice I.O. Kasali (Mrs.)
- The Honourable Justice A.M. Nicol-Clay (Mrs.)
- The Honourable Justice M. Olokoba
- The Honourable Justice A.J. Coker (Mrs.)
- The Honourable Justice M.A. Dada (Mrs.)
- The Honourable Justice M.O. Obadina (Mrs.)
- The Honourable Justice R.I.B. Adebiyi (Mrs.)
- The Honourable Justice O.H. Oshodi
- The Honourable Justice J.E. Oyefeso (Mrs.)
- The Honourable Justice O.A. Williams (Mrs.)
- The Honourable Justice Y.A. Adesanya (Mrs.)
- The Honourable Justice A.A. Oyebanji (Mrs.)
- The Honourable Justice J.O. Pedro (Mrs.)
- The Honourable Justice S.A. Onigbanjo
- The Honourable Justice O.A.Taiwo (Mrs.)
- The Honourable Justice B.A. Oke-Lawal (Mrs.)
- The Honourable Justice L.A. Okunnu
- The Honourable Justice L.B. Lawal-Akapo
- The Honourable Justice M.A. Okikiolu-Ighile (Mrs.)
- The Honourable Justice O.A. Olayinka (Mrs.)
- The Honourable Justice A.O. Opesanwo (Mrs.)
- The Honourable Justice S.O. Nwaka (Mrs.)
- The Honourable Justice C.A. Balogun
- The Honourable Justice I.O. Harrison (Mrs.)
- The Honourable Justice M.O. Emeya (Mrs.)
- The Honourable Justice K.A. Jose (Mrs.)
- The Honourable Justice O.A. Dabiri
- The Honourable Justice O.A. Akinlade (Mrs.)
- The Honourable Justice O.O. Femi-Adeniyi (Mrs.)
- The Honourable Justice L.A.M. Folami (Mrs.)
- The Honourable Justice L.A.F. Oluyemi (Mrs.)
- The Honourable Justice K.O. Dawodu
- The Honourable Justice S.S Ogunsanya (Mrs.)
- The Honourable Justice G. A Safari
- The Honourable Justice M. A Savage
- The Honourable O.A Ogala (Mrs.)
- The Honourable Justice F. Bankole-Oki (Ms.)
- The Honourable Justice A. J. Bashua
- The Honourable Justice A.M. Lawal
- The Honourable Justice S. I. Sonaike (Mrs.)
- The Honourable Justice I.O. Akinkugbe (Mrs.)
- The Honourable Justice W. Animahun
- The Honourable Justice E.O Ogundare
- The Honourable Justice E.M Alakija (Mrs.)
- The Honourable Justice O.A. Adamson
- The Honourable Justice O.O. Ogungbesan(Mrs.)
- The Honourable Justice A.A. Akintoye(Mrs.)
- The Honourable Justice Y. R. Pinheiro
- The Honourable Justice K. O. Ogunjobi
- The Honourable Justice A. O. Soladoye
- The Honourable Justice S.O Solebo (Ms.)
