= George Ashiru =

Nigerian taekwondo practitioner

- Born: Nigeria
- Style: Taekwondo
- Rank: 9th dan taekwondo

George Ashiru is a Nigerian Taekwondo grandmaster and sports leader, political leader, and an entrepreneur.

He was born to a royal household in the southwestern part of Nigeria. His father became an international diplomat, working in Brussels with the African Caribbean and Pacific (ACP) Group. His mother was a successful entrepreneur and one time president of the Nigerian-American Chamber of Commerce, Kaduna. She was a US "Visitor", having participated in the International Visitor Leadership Programme (IVLP) of the US Government. George was educated in Nigeria and Britain and studied in diverse schools like Irwin Academy (UK), Ijebu Ode Grammar School, Nigeria, Federal Government College, Kaduna, Nigeria, University of Lagos and Middlesex University (UK), and became a professional Fellow of Institute of Consulting and a Chartered Fellow of the Chartered Management Institute of the United Kingdom. He earned the qualification of Certified Management Consultant.

Seven times Ashiru was Nigerian Taekwondo champion in the light and welter weight categories and won a silver medal at the 4th All Africa Games in Kenya in 1987. He has been named Best National Player, Best National Referee and then Team Manager to the Beijing 2008 Nigerian Taekwondo Olympic Team. Additionally, he became Africa's first ever 7th Degree Black belt International Master Instructor & International Referee Class A, certified by the International Taekwon-Do Federation (ITF), and 8th Degree Taekwondo, issued in Korea through Taekwondo Jidokwan Korea, named "Taekwondo Ambassador" by Taekwondo Jidokwan Society, and is listed in the World Taekwondo Federation (WTF) Hall of Fame. He is Technical Advisor and two time Inductee of the Official Taekwondo Hall of Fame and a Special Correspondent with the US Taekwondo Times magazine. In 2011 the president of the Kukkiwon awarded him the "Commendation Certificate" for promotion of Taekwondo all over the world. George Ashiru is also an International Referee by the World Taekwondo Federation as well as a graduate of the Kukkiwon Foreign Masters Training Course, 2012. He was appointed Regular Member of the Kukkiwon 2012 Seoul World Taekwondo Leaders Forum. He is also distinguished as a certified Master of Tang Soo Do by the World Tang Soo Do Association and one of the world's leading exponents of Korean Kempo. In Nigeria, he was at various times, an executive member of the Nigeria Judo Federation, chairman, Grading Commission of the Nigeria Taekwondo Federation, chairman, Ogun State Taekwondo Association and a member of the Nigeria Olympic Committee, Marketing Commission. In December 2012 he was "Outstanding Achievement" Awardee of the Korean Ambassador to Nigeria and was in the same period appointed the continental director for Africa by the Official Taekwondo Hall of Fame. In May 2013 he was elected the 7th President of the World Taekwondo Federation member national association (MNA), the Nigeria Taekwondo Federation. In 2013 George Ashiru was elected vice president of the Commonwealth Taekwondo Union. In 2014 he was appointed by the Honourable Minister of Sports in Nigeria as a member of the National High Performance Task Team. He is a board member of the Nigeria Olympic Committee, and vice chairman of the Technical Commission of the NOC.

George Ashiru was appointed the international technical advisor of the Sierra Leone Taekwondo Association in 2018. In 2017 and 2021 he was international expert for Olympic solidarity programmes in Sierra Leone. In February 2022 he was promoted to 9th degree black belt by the World Taekwondo Jidokwan Federation, based in Seoul, Korea.

George Ashiru, in addition to his exploits in sports is also highly accomplished in several other areas. He was elected the Lagos State Chairman of the African Democratic Congress Party in May 2017. In 1988 he was named "Mr Nigeria" and represented the country at the 11th Mr & Miss University Pageant in Tokyo, Japan. He was a delegate to the World Student's Festival in the UK in 1990. He was a national television presenter on Nigeria's NTA Youth Scene between 1988 and 1990. While studying at the University of Lagos, Nigeria, he founded the Ultimate Gold/Love Foundations and the University of Lagos Taekwondo Club, both of which have endured since the mid-1980s till today. In recognition of his varied achievements, Nigeria's Vanguard Newspapers named him one of the "40 Young Leaders of The Future" in 1995. In 1997 he was awarded with the prestigious "Men of Achievement Awards" at the Lagos Sheraton Hotels. In 1998, the Comet Newspapers also named him "Leader of the Future". He also produced a television programme for DBN Television in Lagos and was a regular columnist for several magazines, since the then popular but now defunct Classique Magazine, back in the late 80s. In 1997 he led a delegation of business men members of the Nigerian American Chamber of Commerce (Kaduna) to the World Trade Expo, in Detroit, USA. Later that same year, he organised, with the same Chamber, the National Seminar, "Nigeria Can Compete".

George is an ordained minister of the Gospel, with his own Transformation Ministries. In 2003, the Federal Government co-opted him as an official Chaplain for the COJA 2003 All Africa Games in Abuja. He also coordinates the NGO, Town Hall Meetings Project (THMP). He also runs his own IATA-accredited travel business and is an official representative of the London School of Business and Finance (LSBF) in Nigeria. He was, at one time the vice chairman of the Tourism Group of the Nigerian American Chamber of Commerce, Lagos. One of George's keen activities is mentoring emerging leaders and giving inspirational talks, to youths, government personnel and the general citizenry, on personal development, entrepreneurship, and nation building. He is also a member of several national prayer intercession groups.
