= Uromi =

City in Edo state, Nigeria

- City
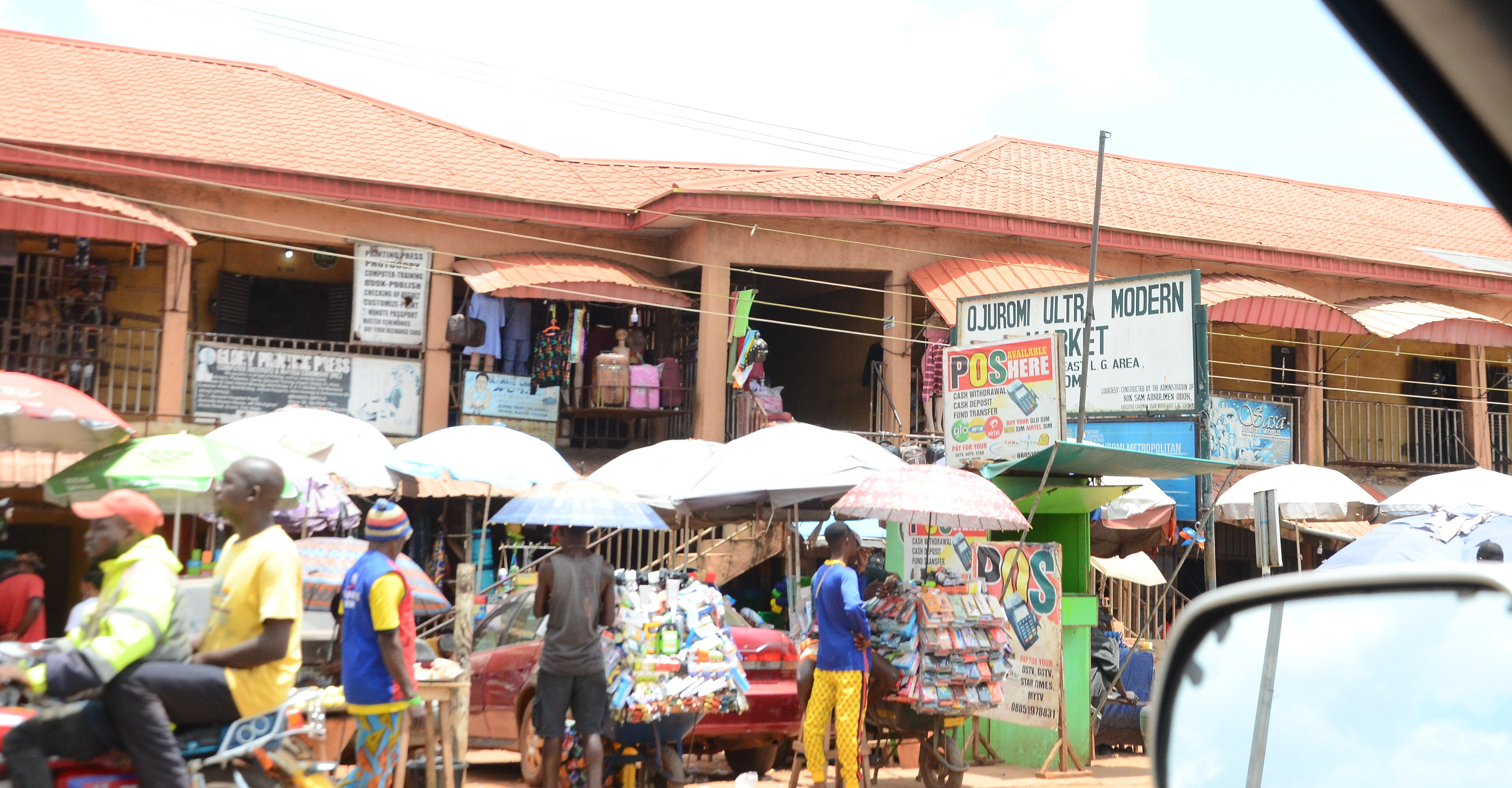
- Uromi Main Market
- Interactive map of Uromi
- Location within Nigeria
- Coordinates: 6.7°N 6.33°E
- Country: Nigeria
- State: Edo State
- LGA: Esan North-East

Population
  - Total: 180,000
  - Density: 3,000/km^{2} (7,800/sq mi)
- Time zone: UTC+1 (WAT)

Uromi is a city in Esan North-East, in Central Edo state, Nigeria. At various points in Uromi's history, the city and people have been known for their resilience and strength. The people of Uromi, led by Agba N'Ojie resisted the Benin Empire's expansionism during the reign of Oba Ozolua. They were also at the forefront of the resistance to the British invasion of Esanland.

== History ==
Uromi, originally known as 'Uronmun', is the most populated area in Esanland, settled by several waves of people. The first wave consisted of the aborigines who were believed to have settled in the various autonomous villages, from the present day central Nigeria. These settlements date as far back as 100 AD. The villages had a system of gerontocracy where the eldest man was the head. Then other migrants poured in from various places in present day Esanland, Ifeku Island and Igodomigodo. The Kingdom itself was formed around 1100 AD to 1200 AD.

The Kingdom is headed by a King who is known as Onojie in Esan language. The present King of the kingdom is HRM, the Ojuromi (Ojie Uromi) Anslem Odaloighe Aidenojie II.

Uromi is a conurbation of towns and villages divided into three groups, recognized as Okhiode, Obiruan and Obiyon.

=== The villages of Okhiode ===
Consisting of:

- Eguare
- Egbele
- Onewa
- Utako
- Unuwazi
- Arue and Isua
- Uje Oror

=== The villages of Obiruan ===
Consisting of:

- Ebhoiyi
- Efandion
- Ekhue
- Ubierumu
- Eror
- Obeidu
- Uwalor
- Idumoza
- Ivue
- Idumhengan Ebhoyi
- Eko-Ibadin
- Uwalor Okpere

=== The villages of Obiyon ===
Consisting of:

- Amedeokhian
- Ukoni
- Iruele
- Idumu-Iyasele
- Okpuje Ne Amedokhian
- Idumu-Onogbosele
- Awo

Eguare, the seat of the Onojie of Uromi, is made up of seven villages, namely:

- Ikekiala
- Okpujie
- Oyomon
- Odigule
- Okhieren
- Uwalor-Okpere
- Uwalor-Usogho
- Idejie

The seven villages have the responsibility of crowning a new king.

== Economy ==
A large percentage of the economy of Uromi is derived from local farming and trading, with some contribution from the government's budget. Uromi's productive farm output is mainly the result of its situation in a rain forest zone, its loamy soil type and its topography.

Uromi also has a good number of markets that provide opportunities for local farmers to trade their farm products. The Uromi Main Market has good, portable lock-up stores. Although officially market day is held at four-day intervals, the Uromi Main Market operates daily from morning to late evening. Across Uromi, there may be up to three markets in each village, with some village markets functioning at four-day intervals, while others trade every day.

Apart from farming and trading, other business transactions take place on a daily basis. In Eguare, there are many business offices both in the government-owned business sector and in the privately owned business sectors. Some examples of financial businesses include the Union Bank, United Bank for Africa (UBA), First Bank of Nigeria, Unity Bank, Zenith Bank, EcoBank, Fidelity Bank, Uromi Community Bank, and other monetary firms like the Uromi Microfinance Bank, etc.

Uromi is home to the Institute of Construction Technology and Management (NICTM) situated on Amedokhian-Ugboha Road, Amedokhian. The NICTM provides a wide range of courses, including Computer Science and Civil Engineering. Uromi is also host to the Uromi Technical College in Onewa Village.

== Religion and belief ==
Uromi traditional religion is the same with other traditional religions of other Esan kingdoms, even though Westernization has caused Christianity and Islamic influence.

Esan religion has so many deities, which among them are:

Osenobua: which actually is the name of the Esan God. This name was adopted into Christianity as God, and thus the meaning and the translation for God in Esanland is Osenobua.

Osun: This is the Esan god of medicine. This god is not the same as Oshun the Yoruba deity in Oshogbo.

=== Festivals ===
Talking about Uromi, we must mention some of the traditional festivals with the knowledge that Uromi people value their tradition so much. Speaking on one of the festivals known as OTO-UROMI and briefly on Amukpe.

As the name implies, Oto-Uromi (Uromi land) is celebrated in the month of July or early August. This celebration is done to appease the land of Uromi in order for good harvest. The date for this festival is always a market day, fixed by the Onojie of Uromi who acts on the advice of his Chiefs. The people are given a notice of 15 days after the announcement of the date for the purpose of preparation.

It is a custom that no one goes to the farm on the day of celebration. The ceremony is performed on a chosen spot by Iwienbola people. To appease the land or the soil, these items are brought; Four sticks of chalk, four kola-nuts, cowries, ripe pumpkin and a dog. The people merry, sharing gifts among themselves, most especially, in every home, women send gift to their husbands for giving them portion of the farm for the year. After the festival, the Onojie of Uromi summons his elders and chiefs and through them appreciates the people for making the celebration a success.

Another festival celebrated in Uromi is the Amukpe festival which is celebrated yearly during the month of August. It is always a day celebration which is meant to usher in new yams. This is also called Ihuan or Ihunlan in some villages. It is widely celebrated by each village indigenes that make up Uromi at their designated date of the year, usually within the harvest period of the summer season. The celebrating village usually attract a large number of visitors and well-wishers from the neighboring villages, towns and cities. The ceremonies are accompanied by large displays of fanfares.

== Geography ==
The city of Uromi lies in north-eastern Esan in Edo State, Nigeria, on longitude 3° 24' E and latitude 6° 27' N. Almost the whole of the city is covered with land.

=== Climate ===
The climate in Uromi is similar to that of the rest of southern Nigeria. There are two rainy seasons, with the heaviest rains falling from April to July and a weaker rainy season in October and November. There is a brief relatively dry spell in August and September and a longer dry season from December to March. Monthly rainfall between May and July averages over 300 mm (12 in), while in August and September it is down to 75 mm (3 inches) and in January as low as 35 mm (1.5 inches). The main dry season is accompanied by harmattan winds from the Sahara Desert, which between December and early February can be quite strong. The average temperature in January is 27 °C (79 °F) and for July it is 25 °C (77 °F). On average the hottest month is March; with a mean temperature of 29 °C (84 °F); while July is the coolest month.

== Politics and government ==
Uromi is not a municipality and has therefore no overall city administration or governance but instead, it is run by the Local government council headed by a Chairman.

Uromi is not a local government but is the seat of the local government council governing the Esan North-East local government area. The administration of the government of Uromi is divided into eleven (11) wards. Each ward delegates a Councillor who represents it at its local council election who is normally tenured for four years.

== Notable people ==
- Chief Anthony Enahoro
- Chief Tony Anenih
- Cardinal Anthony Olubunmi Okogie
- Chris Aire
- Dr. Robert S. Okojie (research scientist, NASA)
- Arc Dr Mike Onolemenmen. Notable politician and technocrat. [Former Minister of Works]
- Benita Okojie (Gospel singer, actress and songwriter)

== Kingship ==
The Uromi kingdom is a monarchical territory headed by a king (Onojie) who handles the leadership of the kingdom. The leadership in the Uromi kingdom is a hereditary monarchy system. The king is the monarch who rules with the body of chiefs who assist the king in the leadership of the kingdom.

=== List of Kings of Uromi kingdom ===
- Ijiesan
- Ozogbo
- Aiwogho
- Uwaifo
- Agba I
- Aigbojie
- Ikhimhin
- Ehidiamen
- Aisiokuo
- Ikiesan
- Agba N’Ojie
- Ikenoa
- Ehenoa
- Ikhivabhojere
- Okuoye
- Ikhize
- Ikhimigbale
- Uwagbo
- Ediale
- Akhilomen
- Okolo N’Ojie
- Ogbidi Okojie
- Uwagbale
- Edenojie Okojie I
- Omelimen Edenojie I
- Anslem Edenojie II

The different villages of Uromi are led by the Elders of the individual villages who are responsible to the king. The council of Elders are headed by an indigenous elderly man who by birth is eldest among all the male indigenes. The council of elders have their own legislative authority and so are able to mete out punishment to offenders within their designation.

== Gallery ==
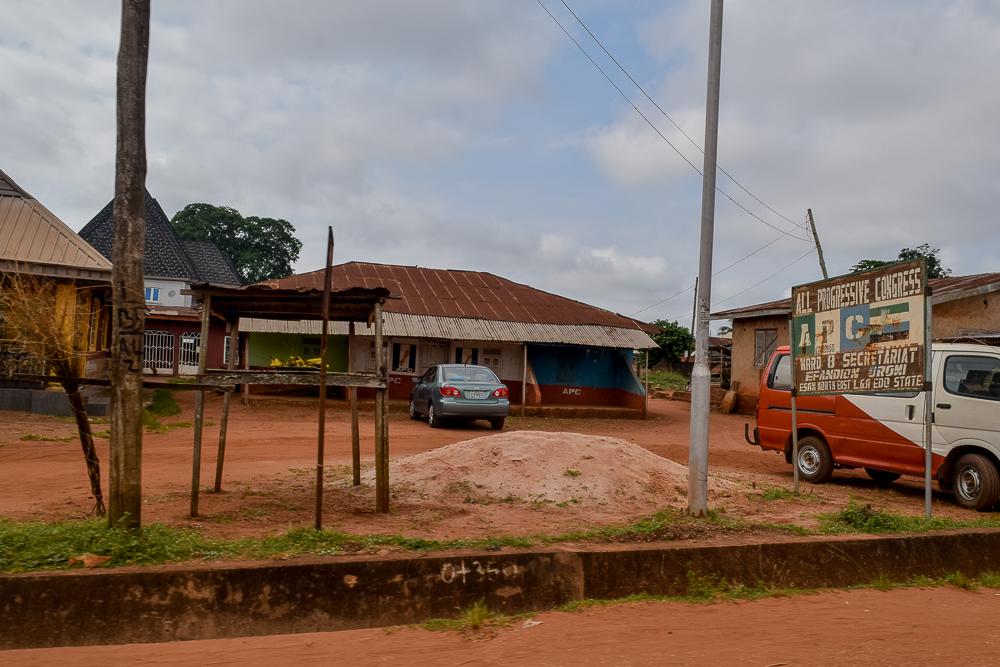

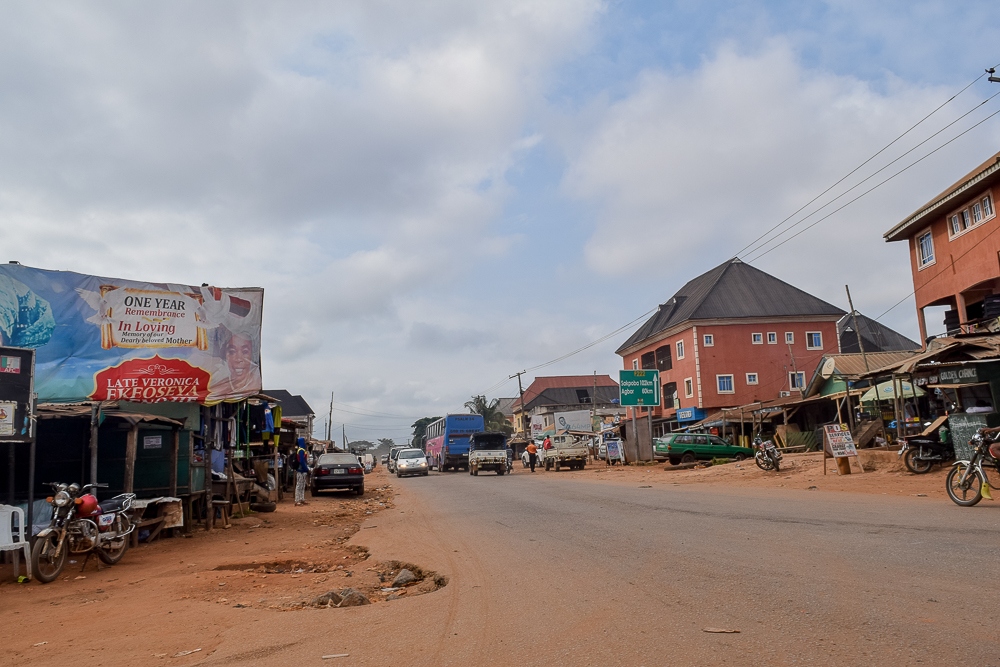

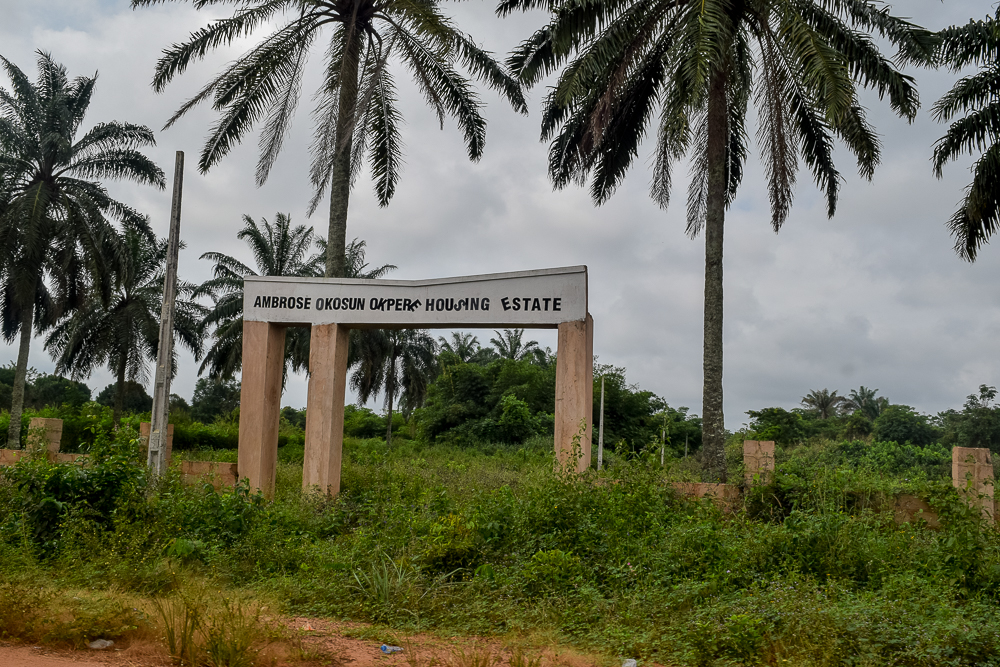

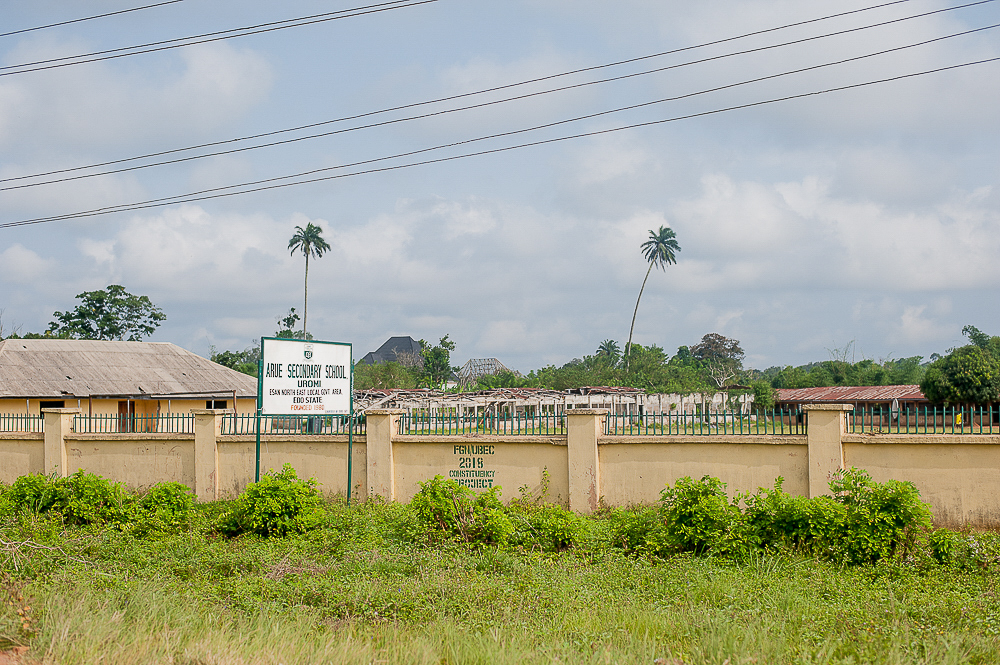

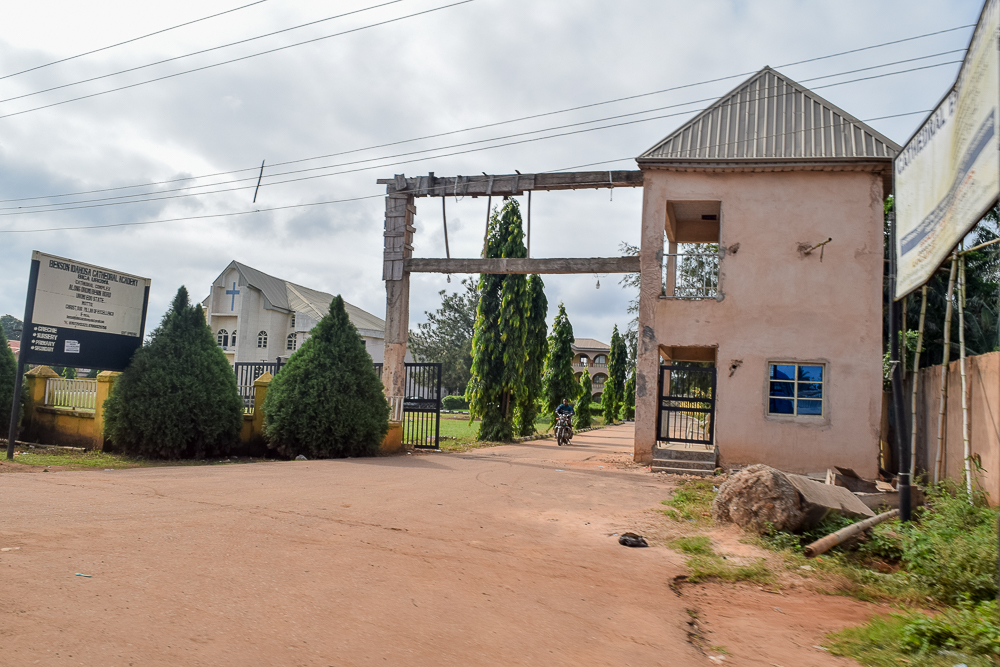

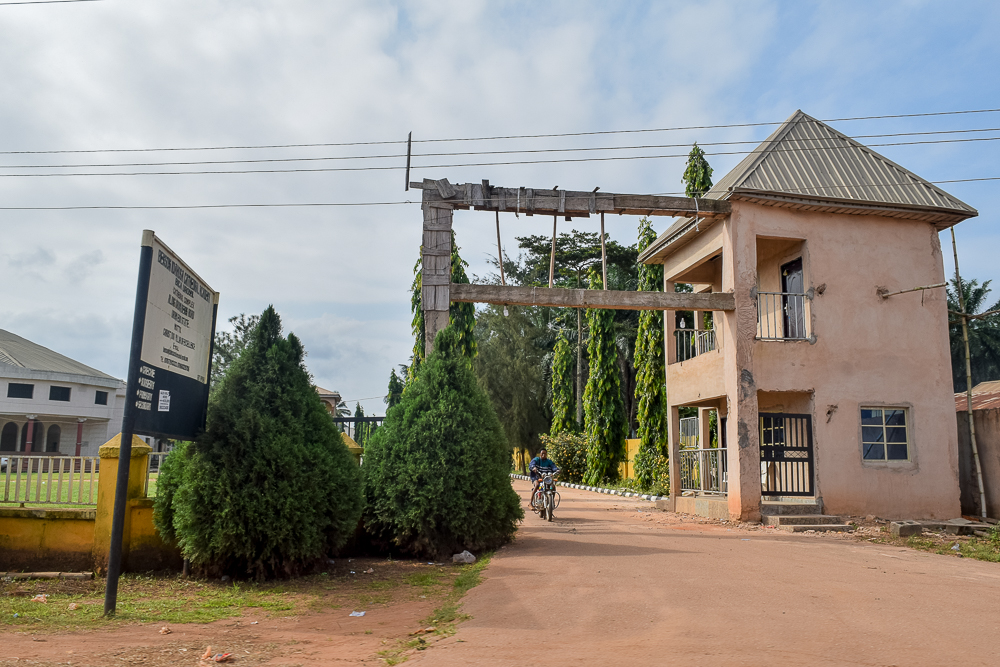

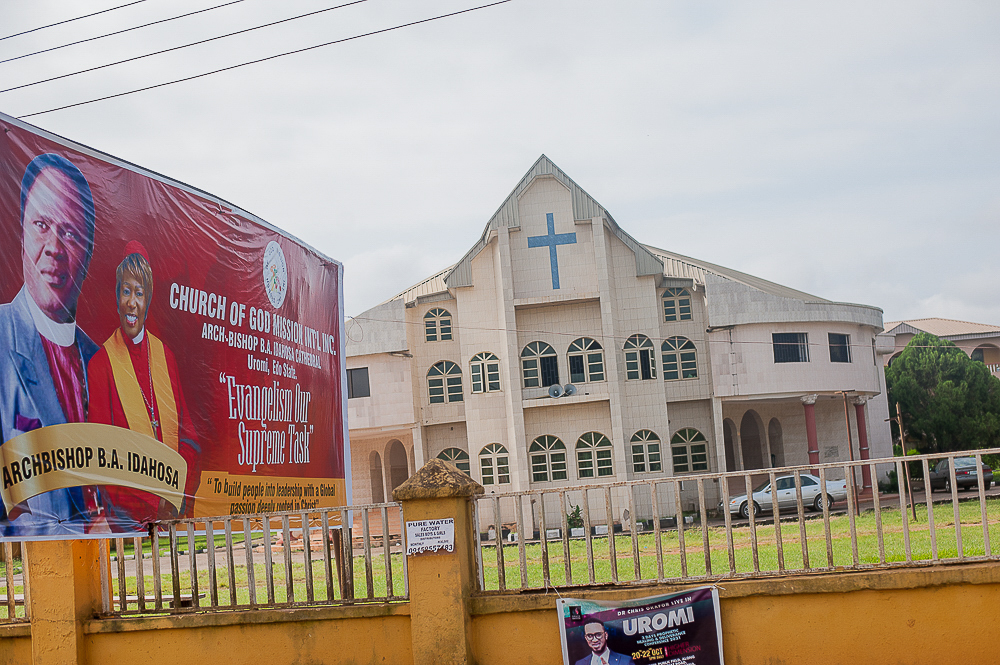

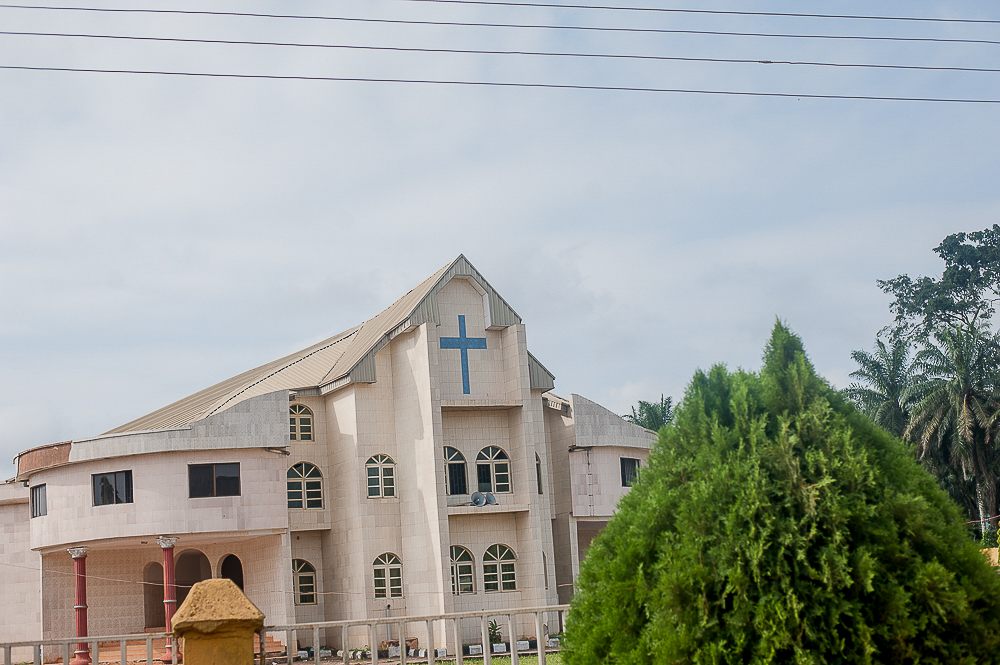

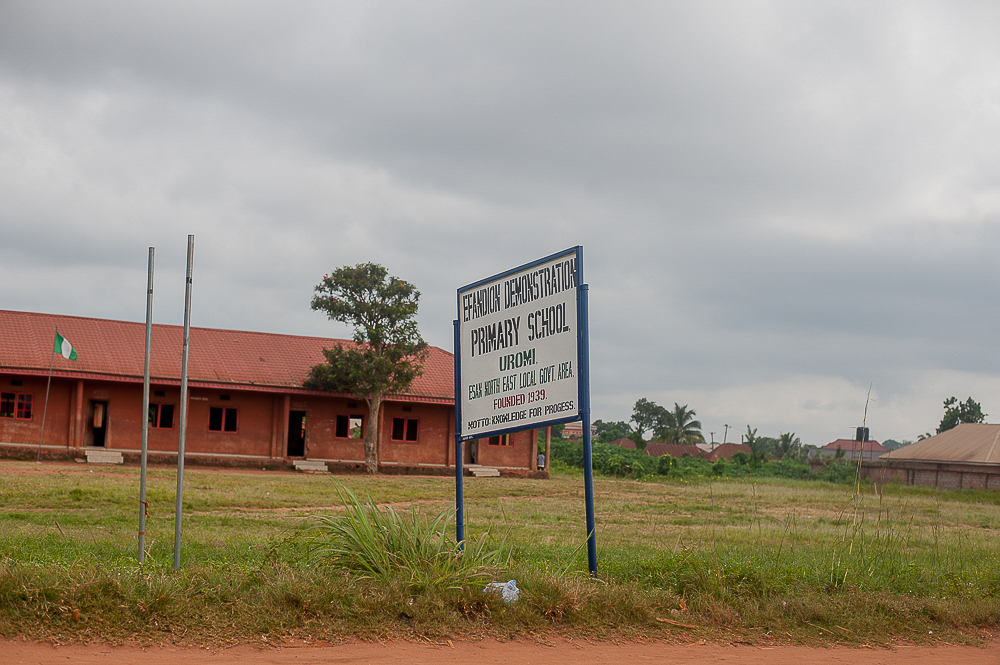

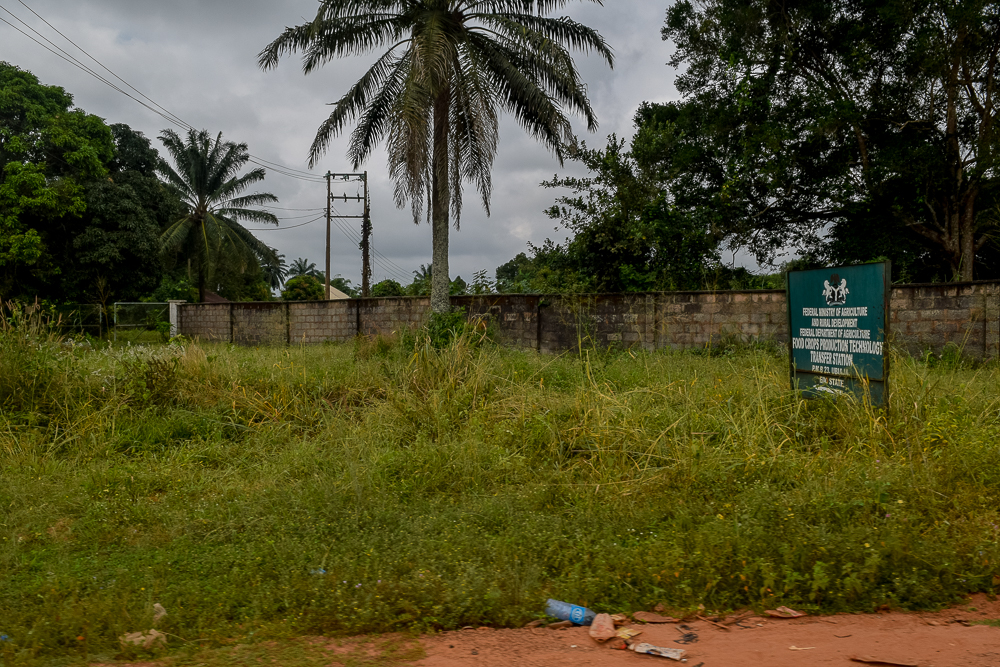

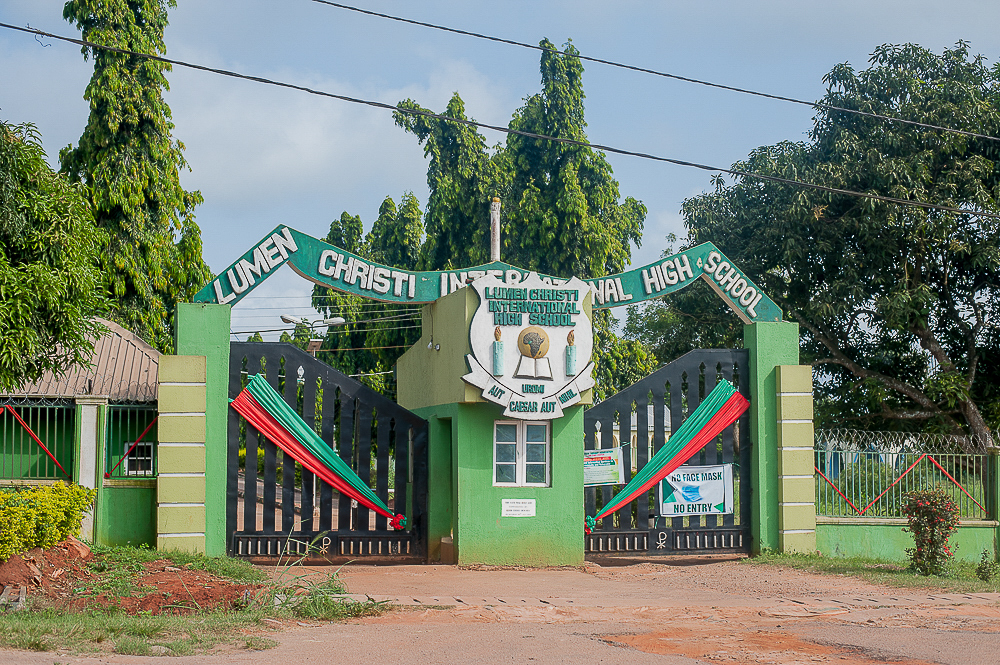

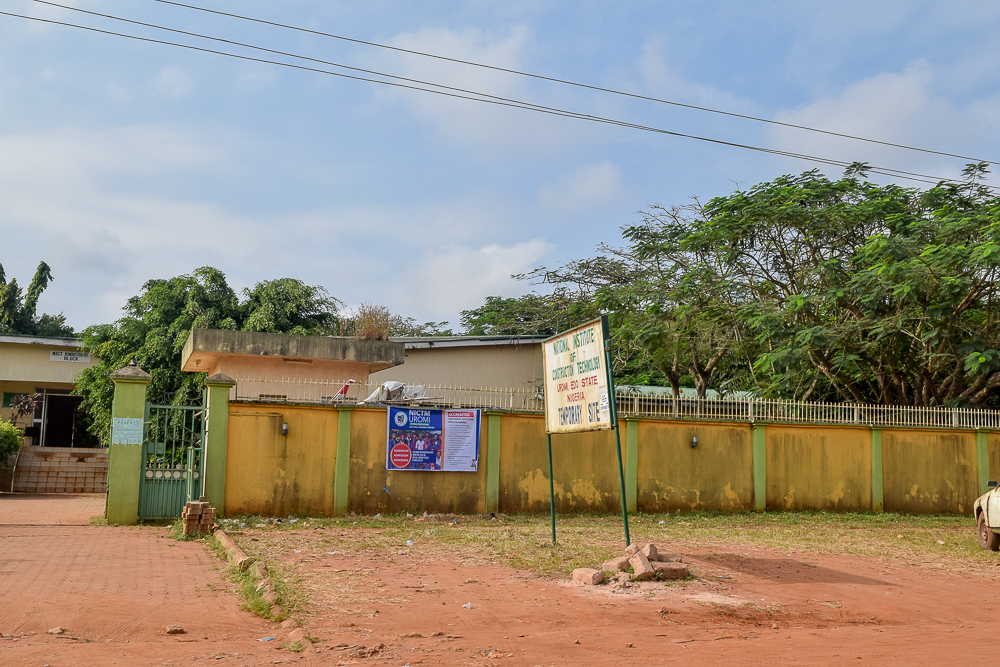

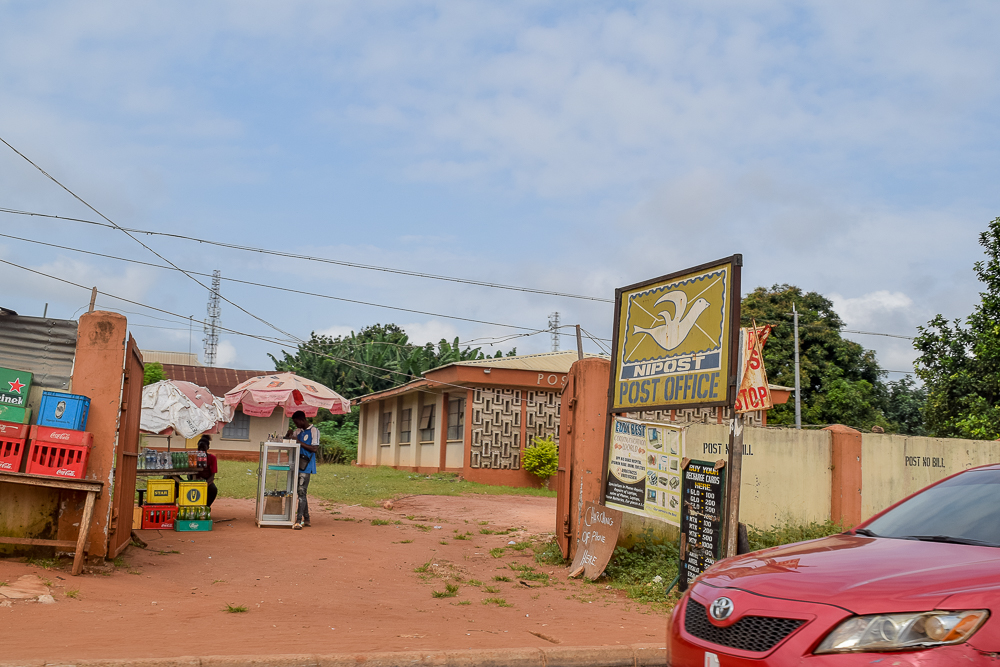

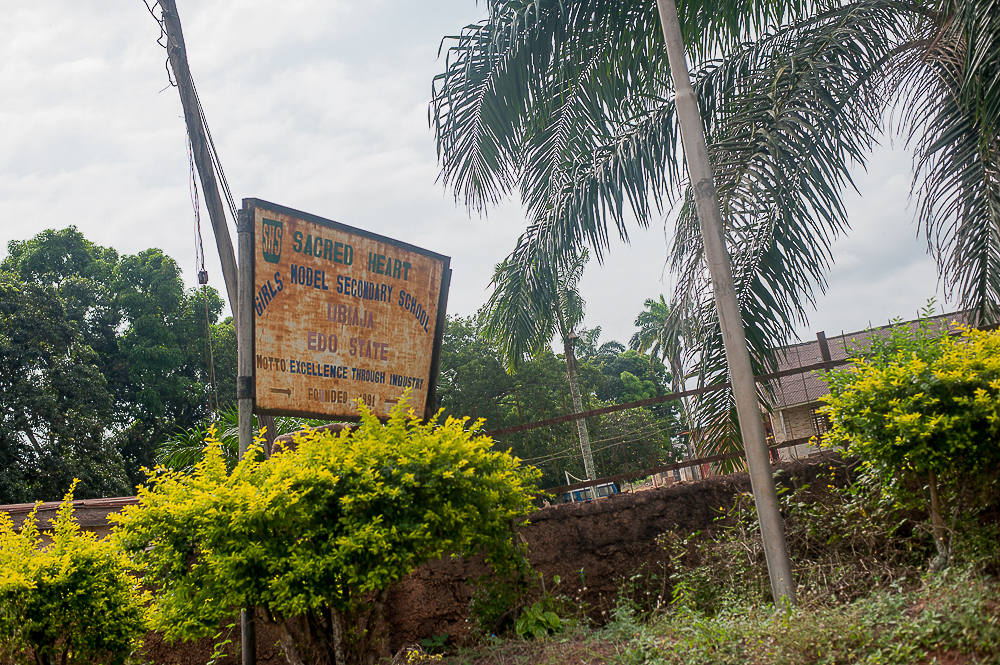

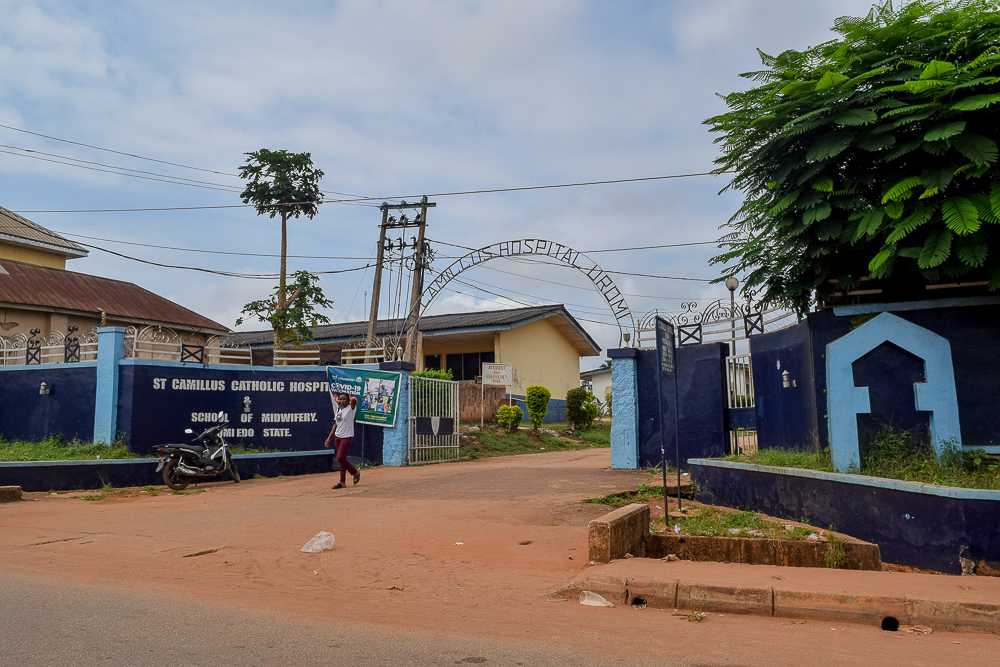

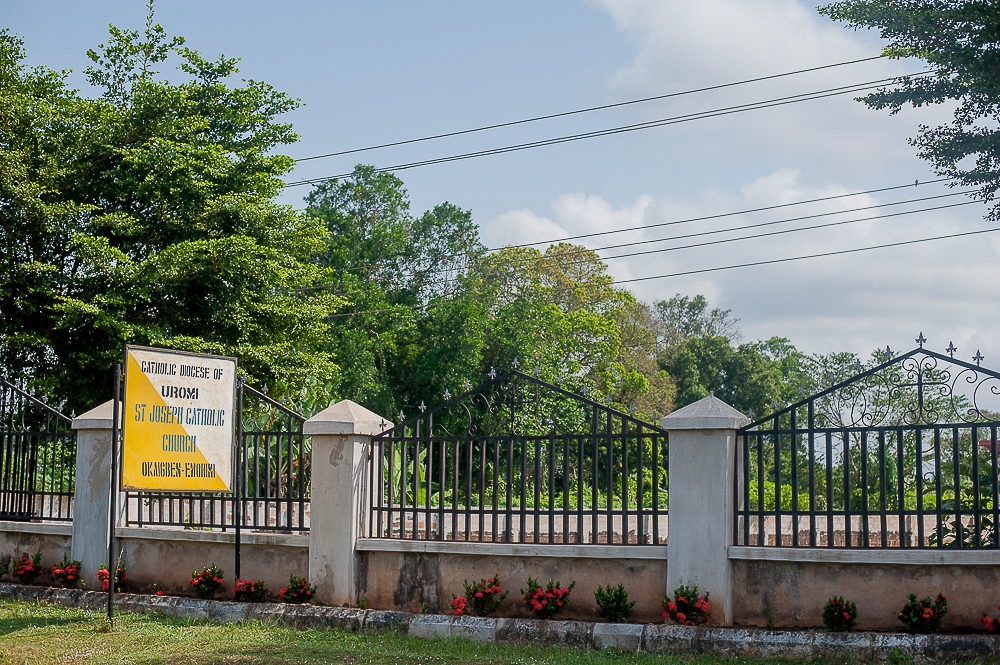

== See also ==
- Esan North-East
- Esan people
- Edo State

== Footnotes ==
- History of Uromi. c/o Uromi Community Association New York
