= Aminu Ashiru Mani =

Nigerian politician (born 1972)

Member of House of Representatives
- In office 2011–2023
- Succeeded by: Ahmed Yusuf Doro
- Constituency: Bindawa/Mani Federal Constituency

Personal details
- Born: 1972 (age 53–54)
- Party: All Progressives Congress
- Occupation: Politician

Aminu Ashiru Mani (born 1972) is a Nigerian politician who served as the representative for the Bindawa/Mani Federal Constituency of Katsina State in the House of Representatives. He was succeeded by Ahmed Yusuf Doro.

== Early life and political career ==
Mani, a native of Katsina State, was first elected to the House of Representatives in the 2011 elections. He was re-elected in 2015 and again in 2019 under the All Progressives Congress (APC).

He also served as the House Committee Chairman on Lake Chad.
