= Anthony Enahoro =

Nigerian founding father (1923–2010)

Chief Anthony Enahoro CFR
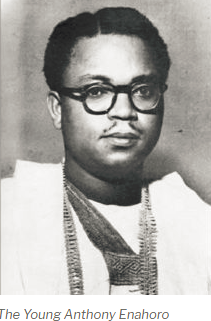

Personal details
- Born: 22 July 1923 Uromi, Western Region, British Nigeria (now Uromi, Edo State, Nigeria)
- Died: 15 December 2010 (aged 87) Benin City, Nigeria
- Party: Movement for National Reformation
- Spouse: Helen
- Relations: Peter Enahoro (brother)
- Children: Kenneth, Eugene, Bella, Victor and Gabriel Enahoro.
- Profession: Politician

Chief Anthony Eromosele Enahoro CFR (22 July 1923 – 15 December 2010) was one of Nigeria's foremost anti-colonial and pro-democracy activists.

He was born the eldest of ten children in Uromi, present-day Edo State of Nigeria. His Esan parents were Anastasius Okotako Enahoro (1900–1968) and Fidelia Victoria Inibokun née Ogbidi Okojie (1906–1969). Enahoro had a long and distinguished career in the press, politics, civil service and the pro-democracy movement. Educated at the Government School, Uromi, Government School, Owo and King's College, Lagos.

Enahoro became the editor of Nnamdi Azikiwe's newspaper, the Southern Nigerian Defender, Ibadan, in 1944 at the age of 21, thus becoming Nigeria's youngest editor ever. He later became the editor of Zik's Comet, Kano, 1945–49, associate editor of West African Pilot, Lagos, and editor-in-chief of Morning Star from 1950 to 1953.

In 1953, Enahoro became the first to move the motion for Nigeria's independence which was eventually granted in 1960, after several political setbacks and defeats in the parliament. Enahoro has been regarded by academics and many Nigerians, as the "Father of Nigeria State".

His initial motion for Nigeria's Independence suffered a setback in the parliament, with the northern members of the parliament staging a walkout as a consequence of the motion. Notwithstanding the defeat in the parliament, a popular movement was started on account of this motion and the pressure was now mounted against colonialism and there were agitations for independence of Nigeria, or at least, self-governance. S. L. Akintola attempted to revisit the motion for Nigeria's independence in 1957 and though his motion was passed by the parliament, it was not acquiesced to by the British colonial authorities and it therefore failed.

In August 1958, Remi Fani-Kayode revisited Enahoro's motion and the motion was again passed by the parliament but its date was not approved by the British. Fani-Kayode's motion had called for independence to be granted to Nigeria on 2 April 1960. In furtherance of Enahoro's original motion, a further motion was proposed to the parliament by Sir Abubakar Tafawa Balewa in 1959, and it was passed. As a consequence of the sustained pressure, the colonial governor announced the decision of the British government to grant independence in 1960. Nigeria was granted independence on 1 October 1960.

== Early life ==
Anthony Enahoro was born the eldest of ten children in Onewa village, Uromi, in the present-day Edo State of Nigeria. Some of his siblings include the diplomat Edward, journalist Peter ("Peter Pan"), educator Henry, Mike Enahoro, a broadcaster for the Nigerian Television Authority, Ben, Dan, Bess, Chris, and Emmanuel. His Esan parents were Anastasius Asuelinmen "Okotako" Enahoro (d. 1968) and Fidelia Inibokun née Ogbidi Okojie (d. 1969), a princess in the Nigerian chieftaincy system. Enahoro had a long and distinguished career in the press, politics, the civil service and the pro-democracy movement.

Educated at Government School Uromi, Government School Owo and King's College, Lagos, Enahoro became the editor of Nnamdi Azikiwe's newspaper, the Southern Nigerian Defender, Ibadan, in 1944 at the age of 21. As a student then at Kings College, Enahoro took part in the turbulent Nigerian liberation struggle against colonial rule in the early 1940s, leading to student revolts at the college in Lagos where he was a student leader. He was prominent in politics at a time of rapid change. He was twice jailed for sedition by the colonial government, for an article mocking a former governor, and then for a speech allegedly inciting Nigerian troops serving in the British army. The British marked him as a firebrand, but even as he was jailed for a third time, he was beginning to reassess his position.

== Politics ==
In 1950, Enahoro and Arthur Prest founded the Mid-West Party. Enahoro had already started the Mid-West Press and he published The Nigerian newspaper from 1950 to 1953. The Mid-West Party became part of the Action Group in 1951. Enahoro was a delegate to most of the constitutional conferences leading to the independence of Nigeria in 1960.

During the Nigerian crisis that followed the 1966 coups, Enahoro was the leader of the then Mid-West delegation to the Ad Hoc Constitutional Conference in Lagos. He later became Federal Commissioner (Minister) for Information and Labour under the General Yakubu Gowon Military Government, 1967–74; Federal Commissioner for Special Duties, 1975. He later became a member of the National Party of Nigeria, NPN, 1978–83. He was the president, World Festival of Negro Arts and Culture, 1972–75.

Enahoro was the chairman of the National Democratic Coalition (NADECO), a pro-democracy group that fought dictator Sani Abacha till Abacha's death. Enahoro was conferred with the national honour of Commander, Order of the Federal Republic, CFR, in 1982, and was the chairman of the Movement for National Reformation, MNR, as well as the Pro-National Conference Organisation (PRONACO). He was awarded honorary DSC by the University of Benin in 1972. His publications include the treatise Fugitive Offender.

=== Crisis in Western Nigeria ===
During the 1962 crisis in the old Western region, he was detained along with other Action Group members. Accused of treason during the Awolowo alleged coup trial, Enahoro escaped via Ghana to the United Kingdom in 1963, Nigeria requested Enahoro's extradition under the 1881 Fugitive Offenders Act, preventing his application for political asylum. Early in 1963, the new leader of the Labour party, Harold Wilson, detected the embarrassment caused by Enahoro's arrest and imprisonment. Labour went on the attack in the House of Commons, with support from some Tories, backed by a media furore. He was once one of the best-known Nigerians in Britain. He was the "fugitive offender" who triggered days of debate in the House of Commons in 1963 as he battled against extradition.

"The Enahoro affair" became an issue of human rights versus the government's pusillanimous wish not to offend Nigeria, and put the Tory prime minister, Harold Macmillan, and his home secretary, Henry Brooke, in a difficult position.

He was extradited from the UK and imprisoned for treason. In 1966, he was released by the Military Government.

== Sport ==
Enahoro came from a sporting background. He played golf and followed cricket ardently. He excelled in sports at King's College and is credited with being the first Nigerian national to gain membership of a golf club in Nigeria. He managed to bring his handicap down into single figures during his long golfing career. He was also the driving force behind bringing FESTAC to Nigeria in the 1970s, during which time both Muhammad Ali and Pele visited the country to widespread acclaim.

All his children excelled at sport during their schooling and University years, playing football, rugby, golf and tennis. Kenneth (1953–2017) and Eugene either are or were avid golfers, and were founding members of the Saturday Society at Benin Golf Club. Annabella practices pilates and Gabriel is an avid cyclist.

== Legacy ==
In 1953, Anthony Enahoro initiated the self-government motion in the Western House of Assembly, which eventually led to Nigerian Independence on 1 October 1960.

== Family ==
Enahoro was survived by his wife Helen (née Ediae) (1933–2012), their five children, several grandchildren and great-grandchildren.

== Books ==
- Fugitive offender: the story of a political prisoner
