= John Taylor (Nigerian judge) =

Nigerian jurist

John Idowu Conrad Taylor (24 August 1917 – 7 November 1973) was a Nigerian jurist, Judge of the Supreme Court of Nigeria (1964 to 1967), and the first Chief Justice of Lagos State (1967 to 1973).

== Education and early life ==
John Taylor was born in Lagos and was the fourth child of Eusebius James Alexander Taylor (a prominent lawyer and nationalist) and Remilekun Alice Taylor (née Williams). He attended Olowogbowo Methodist School for his primary education and Methodist Boys' High School for part of his secondary education. He left for England in 1929 where he completed his secondary education at Culford School in Bury St. Edmunds, between April 1929 and July 1936.

He entered King's College London in 1936 to read law, before transferring to Brasenose College, Oxford in 1937 where he was a Boxing Blue. He graduated with a second class degree in the Honour School of Jurisprudence and was subsequently called to the Bar at the Middle Temple on 14 January 1941. He returned to Nigeria in December 1941 and joined his father's law firm, which he later headed upon his father's death in 1947.

== Career ==
Taylor had a swift rise through the Nigerian legal ranks, culminating in appointment as a Judge of the High Court, Western Nigeria, at the age of 39. In 1960 he became Justice of the Supreme Court of Nigeria and, in 1964, Chief Justice of the Federal Territory of Lagos. When Lagos State was created in 1967, he became the first Chief Justice of the new state.

In 1967 Justice Taylor became Pro-Chancellor of the University of Lagos, a position which he held until his death in 1973 at age 56. Upon his death, the Nigerian Head of State, General Yakubu Gowon, delivered a speech in which he said: "In an age which corruption, intrigues back biting and the love of office and power are fast becoming a virtue, Mr. Justice Taylor stood out from the crowd with a detachment that has brought immense dignity to the High Office of a Judge".

He also has a major street in Victoria Island, Lagos named after him.
