= Ogbidi Okojie =

HRM Okojie Okolo N'Ogbidi
- Onojie of Uromi
- Ogbidi Okojie with his wives
- Reign: 1857–1944
- Coronation: 1900
- Predecessor: Okolo N'Ojie
- Successor: Uwagbale
- Born: 1857; Uromi
- Died: 3 February 1944 (aged 86–87); Uromi
- House: Okojie Royal Dynasty
- Father: Okolo N’Ojie
- Mother: Queen Mother Agbon-ilolo Okolo

Ogbidi Okojie, Onojie (king) of Uromi (1857 – 3 February 1944), was a ruler of the Esan people in what is now Edo State in Nigeria, still remembered for his opposition to British rule.

== Biography ==
According to Uromi lore, he was born in the seventh month of gestation, coming 14th in the line of succession to the Uromi throne. As an African monarch, he believed in his divine right to wield absolute power. Those beliefs motivated his opposition to (British )Rule, which led to his first exile to Calabar in 1900. In Nigeria, at the end of the nineteenth century, the old order was crumbling, yielding to the new British colonial system. After the Royal Niger Company transferred its territories to the British government, the latter expanded and strengthened its control, unseating the traditional rulers. In 1900, Uromi was invaded by the British troops. Unlike Chief Nana Olomu of Brohimie-Warri, who opposed a strong resistance to the British troops when his domain was invaded, with 100 cannon, several shot-guns and more than 5,000 slaves at his disposal, Okojie I, who had no modern weapons, but only Dane guns, bows and arrows, held out for six months, until he was betrayed by Iyahanebi, his "younger brother", and had to surrender to the British. As a consequence of his stiff resistance, in 1900 he was exiled to Calabar, where he met Oba Ovonramwen, late Oba of Benin, who had been exiled there by the British.

He survived the ordeal in detention and returned home to be crowned the 14th Onojie of Uromi in 1900. Back home in Uromi, he adapted to the British system of government through "indirect rule", establishing his court at Ubiaja as the Divisional Supreme Judge. Still, he did not fully accept the new system of government, countering it with passive disobedience and maintaining his opposition to British rule. He kept governing his subjects as his forebears had always done, until he was deported again, this time to Benin, in 1918. His presence in Benin unsettled Oba Eweka II, the then ruling Oba, who objected to the British Resident at Benin against Okojie's presence there. In 1924, he was transferred to Ibadan. In 1926, he made a dramatic escape to Uromi, was arrested and taken back to Ibadan, until he was finally released in 1931. From 1931 until his death in 1944 he consolidated his power in Uromi. His first son Prince Uwagbale Okojie was crowned Onojie of Uromi in 1944.

Another of Ogbidi Okojie’s sons was late Hon. Prince Albert Inegbenosun Okojie, OONwho became a prominent political figure in Nigeria. Albert Okojie was a founding member of the Action Group and was also associated with the Midwestern Democratic front. He was the father of Amb.Princess Asha Okojie a Nigerian politician and public affairs advocate, making her a granddaughter of Ogbidi Okojie.

While alive, he was highly influential in Esan, Agbor and Benin City. In Esan he was the supreme judge of the criminal court that sat and tried murder cases at Agbede, Esan, Kukuruku (now known as Auchi) and Ologhodo (now Agbor). He built schools and supported higher learning. He built the roads from Uromi to Ilushi, Agbor and Ehor. When he died, he left behind an undisputed heir to the throne, glorious memories of life in exile and the fulfillment of his aspiration for renewed independence for black Africa and Nigeria. These prompted the Nigerian founding father Chief Anthony Enahoro, one of his many grandchildren, in to initiate the self-government motion in the Western House of Assembly in 1953, which eventually led to Nigerian Independence on 1 October 1960. A younger grandson is Peter Enahoro, revered pan-African journalist and author of How to be a Nigerian (1966). Other grandchildren include Cardinal Anthony Okogie, the first Esan Cardinal, Dr. Robert Okojie, a NASA scientist based in the U.S., amongst others.

Okojie I, the Onojie of Uromi, was survived by more than sixty wives, over forty concubines, and countless children and grandchildren. He is still remembered by his people as Ogbidi, the Uromi umbrella, the white son of Olokun, and Okun—the greatest native doctor ever to rule Uromi—capable, according to legend, of transforming into a girl, a lion, or a leopard at will, commanding the rain to fall, and even stilling the air.

Although he died many years ago, his legacy continues in many different parts of the world, from North America to Europe to Australia, where his grandchildren and great grandchildren currently reside.

== See also ==
- Uromi
- Esan
- Edo State
