= Benita Okojie =

Nigerian gospel singer

Benita Iyere Okogie
- Iyere
- Born: 1988 (age 37–38)
- Education: Redeemers University
- Occupation: Gospel musician
- Known for: Gospel Music: Osemudiame
- Spouse: Wale Adeyina
- Children: 2

Benita Iyere Okojie (born 1988) is a Nigerian gospel singer.

== Early life and education ==
Okojie hails from Edo State and is of the Esan tribe. She graduated from Redeemers University with a degree in English Language and participated in the National Youth Service Corps.

== Career ==
Okojie started out singing mixes of Edo and Yoruba music alongside her siblings. She came into the limelight with her single "Osemudiamen" in 1998 at the age of 10. Her music career was independently managed by her father who had worked with musicians including Onyeka Onwenu, Felix Lebarty, Chris Okotie, and Sonny Okosun. He was credited with the production, distribution and marketing of her music.

In 1999, Okojie performed at the opening and closing ceremonies of the FIFA Under-21 World Cup which was hosted in Nigeria (Nigeria 99). She also performed at Nigeria's 40th independence anniversary celebration in 2000. Her single titled ''Unity Games'' was the theme song for the 8th All Africa Games.

She has featured on a reality TV show titled Moving Up the Squad alongside Nollywood actresses. She works alongside her husband and still releases music.

== Personal life ==
She married Olawale Adeyina on 16 November 2016 and had her first child in October 2017. She had a second child in 2019.

== Selected songs ==
- "Ayo"
- "Celebrate Jesus"
- "Child of God"
- "Confidence"
- "Egbongbon"
- "Jesu N'Abba"
- "Jesus and I"
- "Jesus is Wonderful"
- "Osemudiamen"
- "Owase"
- "Peace"
- "Prayer for Nigeria"
- "Save the Children"
- "Unity Games"
- "Vae"
- "We are going"
- Merciful
- IJesu Mhen
