= Augustine Adetula Alabi =

Nigerian jurist

Hon. Justice Augustine Adetula Alabi

Chief Judge of Lagos State
- In office 8 July 2004 – 7 August 2009

Personal details
- Born: August 8, 1944 (age 82) Idoani, Ondo State, Nigeria

Augustine Adetula Alabi is a Nigerian jurist who served as the Chief Judge of Lagos State from 2004 to 2009. He is also a former Solicitor-General and Permanent Secretary of the Ministry of Justice Lagos State.

== Early life and education ==
Born on 8 August 1944 in Idoani, a town in the Ose Local Government Area of Ondo State, Alabi began his primary education at Holy Trinity School, in Idoani, and completed his secondary education at Imade College in Owo.

He obtained a Bachelor of Laws (LL.B) degree at Obafemi Awolowo University which at the time was called the University of Ife. He was called to the Bar in 1970 after attending the Nigerian Law School in Lagos.

== Law career ==
Alabi legal career started in 1973 as a pupil state counsel at the Lagos State Ministry of Justice. He rose through the ranks and was appointed Solicitor-General and Permanent Secretary of the ministry.

In October 1986, he was appointed as a Judge of the High Court of Lagos State. On 8 July 2004, he was sworn in as Chief Judge of Lagos State by Governor Bola Tinubu. He served in this role until his retirement on 7 August 2009.
