= National Democratic Coalition (Nigeria) =

Coalition of Nigerian democrats formed in 1994

The National Democratic Coalition (NADECO) was formed on 15 May 1994 by a broad coalition of Nigerian democrats, who called on the military government of Sani Abacha to step down in favour of the winner of the 12 June 1993 election, M. K. O. Abiola. The members mostly came from several pro-democracy and activist groups located especially in Lagos, the southwest region of the country. They quickly became the symbol of mass resistance against military rule. On 11 June 1994, using the groundwork laid by NADECO, Abiola declared himself president and went into hiding. He reemerged and was promptly arrested on 23 June.

On 17 November 1994, the first anniversary of Abacha's coup, a bomb exploded in Lagos airport. In response, NADECO leaders warned "it will be a disaster, not only for Nigeria but for the whole world, if Nigerians come to the conclusion that only violence will secure the attention of the international community."

Wale Osun, acting secretary-general of the coalition, was arrested on 19 May 1995. After a bomb explosion later that month in Ilorin, capital of Kwara State, the police arrested and interrogated Chief Cornelius Adebayo and other NADECO members. In July 1997, the government accused the National Democratic Coalition of responsibility for a series of bombings of military targets, and said publicly that they suspected American diplomats knew about the bombings in advance. The inspector general of police, Ibrahim Coomassie, said he wanted to question the American ambassador and members of the US Embassy staff.

In August 1999, the coalition filed a claim for $20 million in compensation for abuses suffered under the Abacha regime.
