= Purple Line (Lagos Transit) =

Future Metro service in Lagos

Overview
- Status: Planned
- Owner: LAMATA
- Termini: Redemption Camp; Ojo
- Color on map: Purple
- Website: https://www.lamata-ng.com/

Service
- Type: Rapid transit
- System: Lagos Metro
- Daily ridership: 550,000 (Planned)

Technical
- Track length: 54.35 km (33.77 mi)
- Number of tracks: 2

The Purple Line is a future 54.35-kilometre line and is developed by the Lagos Rail Mass Transit initiative managed by the Lagos Metropolitan Area Transport Authority (LAMATA). It runs from the Redemption Camp to Ojo near the Lagos State University for more interconnectivity across Lagos. It will be constructed after the Red, Blue and Green Lines. It is projected to carry 549,000 per day, and could do 1.3 million by 2031.

== History ==
On 2 March 2024, Governor Babajide Sanwo-Olu initiated early planning for the Green and Purple Lines—two future additions to the Lagos Rail Mass Transit (LRMT) system. The announcement was made during the inauguration of the LRMT Red Line’s first phase, an event attended by President Bola Tinubu.

In a statement released by Kolawole Ojelabi, Head of Corporate Communication at the Lagos Metropolitan Area Transport Authority (LAMATA), the governor described the Blue and Red Lines as the foundation of a broader vision for urban mobility. He emphasized that these are just the beginning, with a master plan to deliver six fully integrated rail lines across the state.

On 26 February 2025, Officials from the Lagos Metropolitan Area Transport Authority, led by Technical Adviser Planning, Osa Konyeha, met with local government representatives to discuss the planned Purple Line rail project.

Stakeholders included the Chairman of Orile Agege LCDA, Johnson Babatunde; Chairman of Iba LCDA, Yisa Jubril; and Secretary to Alimosho Local Government, Dare Ogunkoya, who represented Chairman Jelili Sulaimon.

LAMATA stated that the Purple Line would span 57 km, connecting Redemption Camp to Volkswagen, with 17 stations integrated into Lagos’s existing rail network.

== Development plan ==
Lagos State will be financing construction of the Purple Line with its own resources. The proposed advantages of the Purple line are that is will allow commuters to spend less time travelling in the area by avoiding traffic jams which can take many hours to get through, whilst also being cheaper. A journey that would have taken two hours in traffic can be taken in 15–30 minutes. The trains will be electrified, and security will be provided to prevent vandalism.

=== Route ===
The planned line will run from Redemption Camp, going through Mowe, Long Bridge, Isheri, Toll Gate, Omole, Ogba, Agege, Iyana Ipaja, Isheri Osun, Igando, Iba, Estate, LASU, Okokomaiko and Ojo. The line is planned to connect with the Red Line at Agege and Blue Line at Okokomaiko. It is projected to carry 549,000 passengers per day, and 1.3 million by 2031.
