= Lagos Rail Mass Transit =

Rapid transit system in Lagos, Nigeria

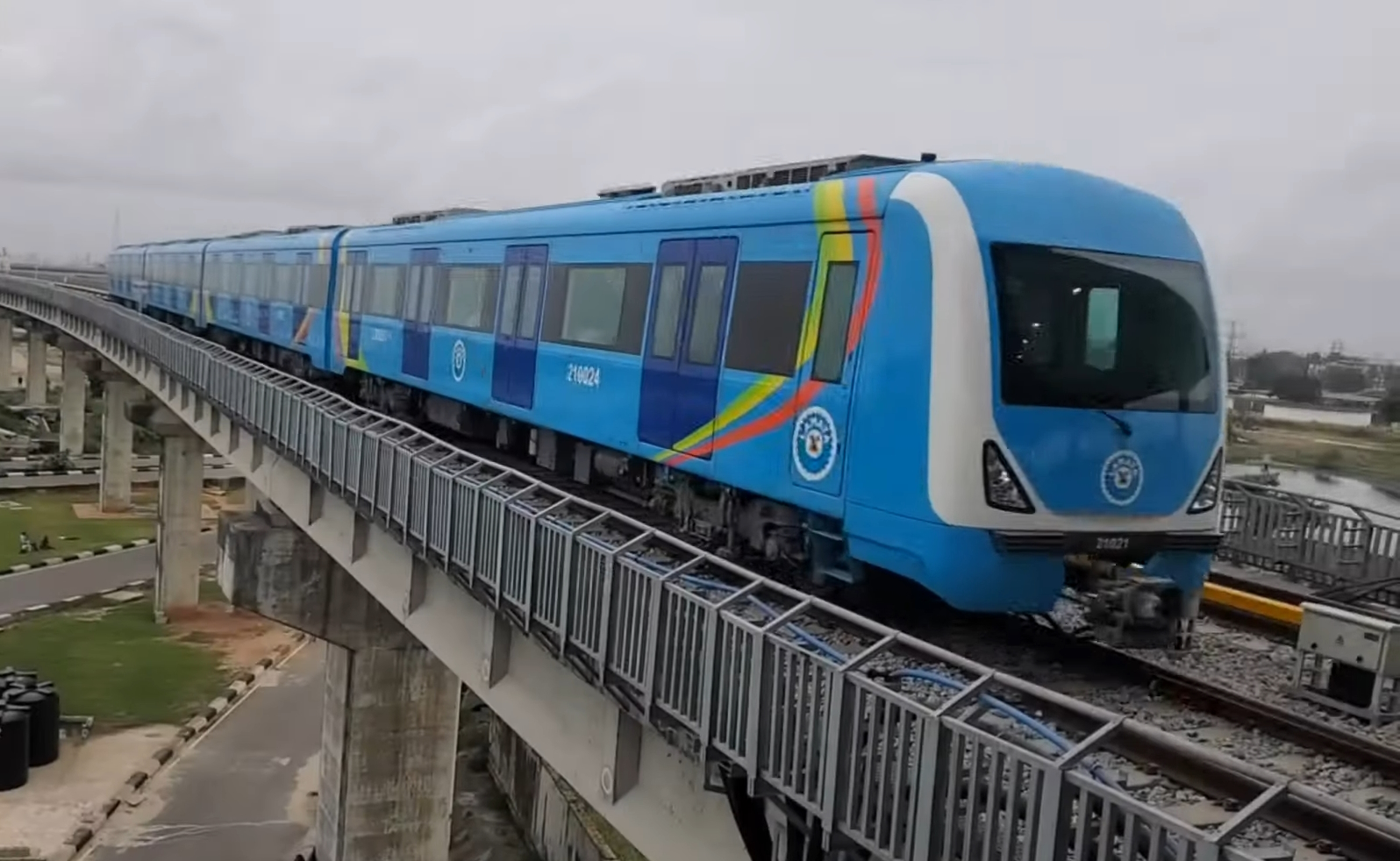

Overview
- Owner: Lagos State (Managed by Eko Rail under Concession Agreement)
- Locale: Lagos State
- Transit type: Rapid transit (Blue Line) Commuter rail (Red Line)
- Number of lines: 2; 5 (proposed)
- Number of stations: 22

Operation
- Began operation: 4 September 2023; 3 years ago
- Operator: Lagos Metropolitan Area Transport Authority (LAMATA)
- Number of vehicles: 15 four-car BMU CNR Dalian for Blue Line

Technical
- System length: 35 km (22 mi) (planned)
- Track gauge: 1,435 mm (4 ft 8 1/2 in) Standard Gauge
- Electrification: Blue Line: 750 V DC third rail Bottom contact Red Line: 1500 V DC overhead catenary

Lagos Rail Mass Transit is a rapid transit system in Lagos State. The rail system is managed by the Lagos Metropolitan Area Transport Authority (LAMATA). The railway equipment including electric power, signals, rolling stock, and fare collection equipment is provided by the private sector under a concession contract. LAMATA is responsible for policy direction, regulation, and infrastructure for the network. The first section of the network, Phase I of the Blue Line, was originally planned to be completed in 2011, though the construction has suffered many delays caused by shortage of funds and change of government. The Blue Line opened on 4 September 2023 and the Red Line opened on 15 October 2024.

== Timeline ==
- 2008: A metro is proposed for Lagos, with a completion date of 2011.
- 2009: Work commenced for construction of the Blue Line rail infrastructure, awarded to China Civil Engineering Construction Corporation (CCECC) as a design and build contract.
- 2016: Phase I (the Blue Line from Marina to Mile 2) planned to open in December 2016.
- 2018: After an Alstom review of the project, Phase I (the Blue Line from Marina to Mile 2) is now set to open in 2021.
- 2021: CCECC commences construction on the Red Line.
- January 2022: LAMATA purchases two Talgo VIII trains.
- On 24 January 2023, President Muhammadu Buhari inaugurated the first phase of the Lagos Mass Transit Blue Line Rail Project.
- On 4 September 2023, Governor Babajide Sanwo-Olu officially opened the Blue Line transit for public use.
- At the beginning of 2024, it was announced that the Lagos suburban railway had transported 583,000 passengers in its first four months.
- On 14 February 2024, Governor Sanwo-Olu announced that the Red Line between Agbado and Oyingbo would be inaugurated on 29 February 2024, in the presence of Nigerian President Tinubu.
- On 15 October 2024, the first section of the Red Line opens to the public.
- April 2025: Work commenced for construction of the Green Line rail infrastructure, awarded to China Harbour Engineering Company (CHEC) and the Ministry of Finance Incorporated (MOFI) as a design and build contract.

== History ==
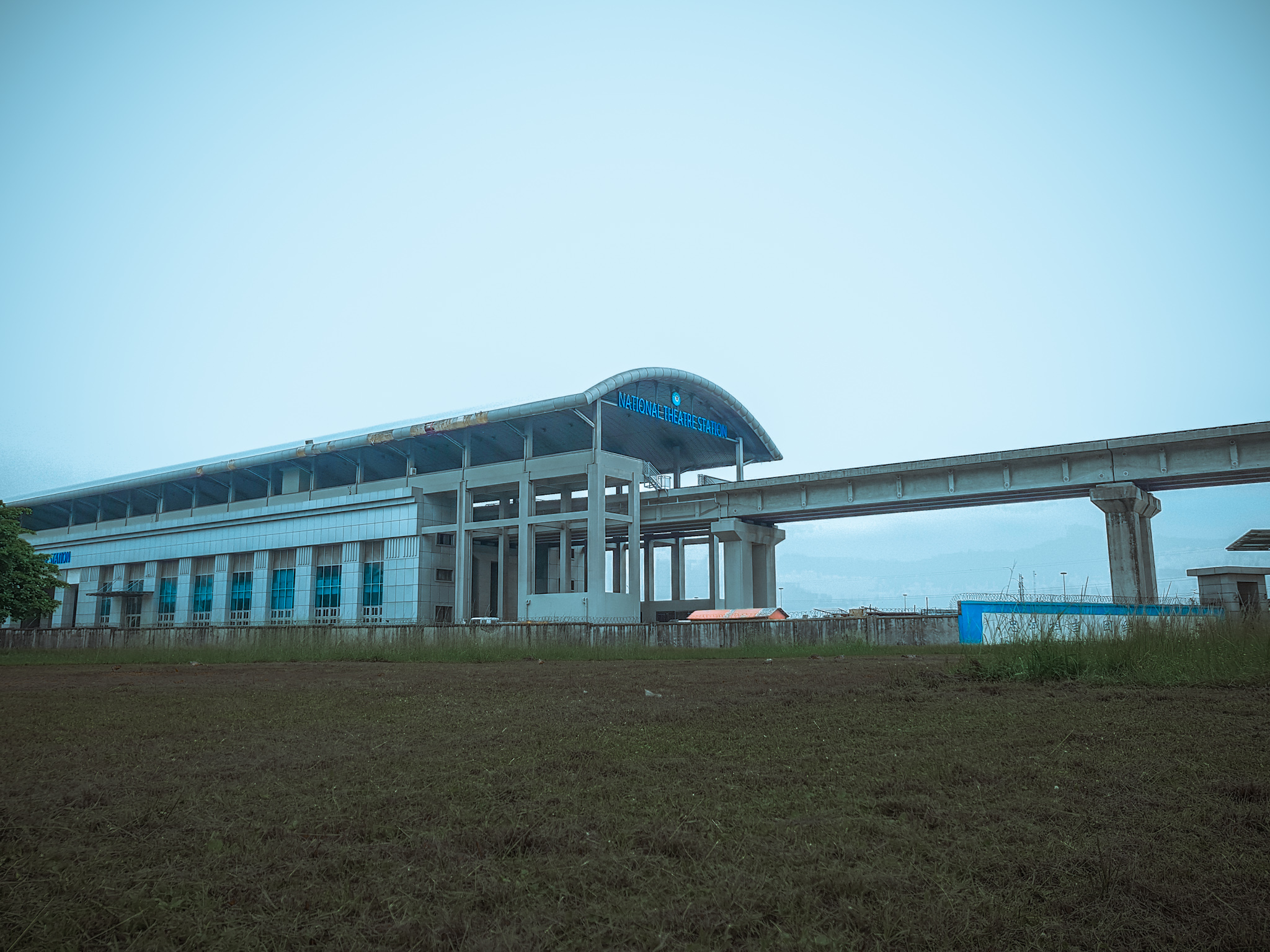
A station of the system under construction

The idea of developing a rapid transit in Lagos state dates back to 1983 with the Lagos Metroline network conceived by Alhaji Lateef Jakande during the Second Nigerian Republic. The initial Metroline project was scrapped in 1985 by Muhammadu Buhari at a loss of over $78 million to state tax payers. In 2003, then-governor Bola Tinubu revived the rail network for Lagos State with a formal announcement of its construction. An initial cost of $135 million was proposed for the Greater Lagos Urban Transportation Project to be implemented by the newly formed LAMATA. LAMATA initially concentrated on developing a Bus Rapid Transit system, running from Mile 2 to Lagos Island. In 2008, LAMATA began focusing on the Blue Line and the Red Line.

== Rolling stock ==
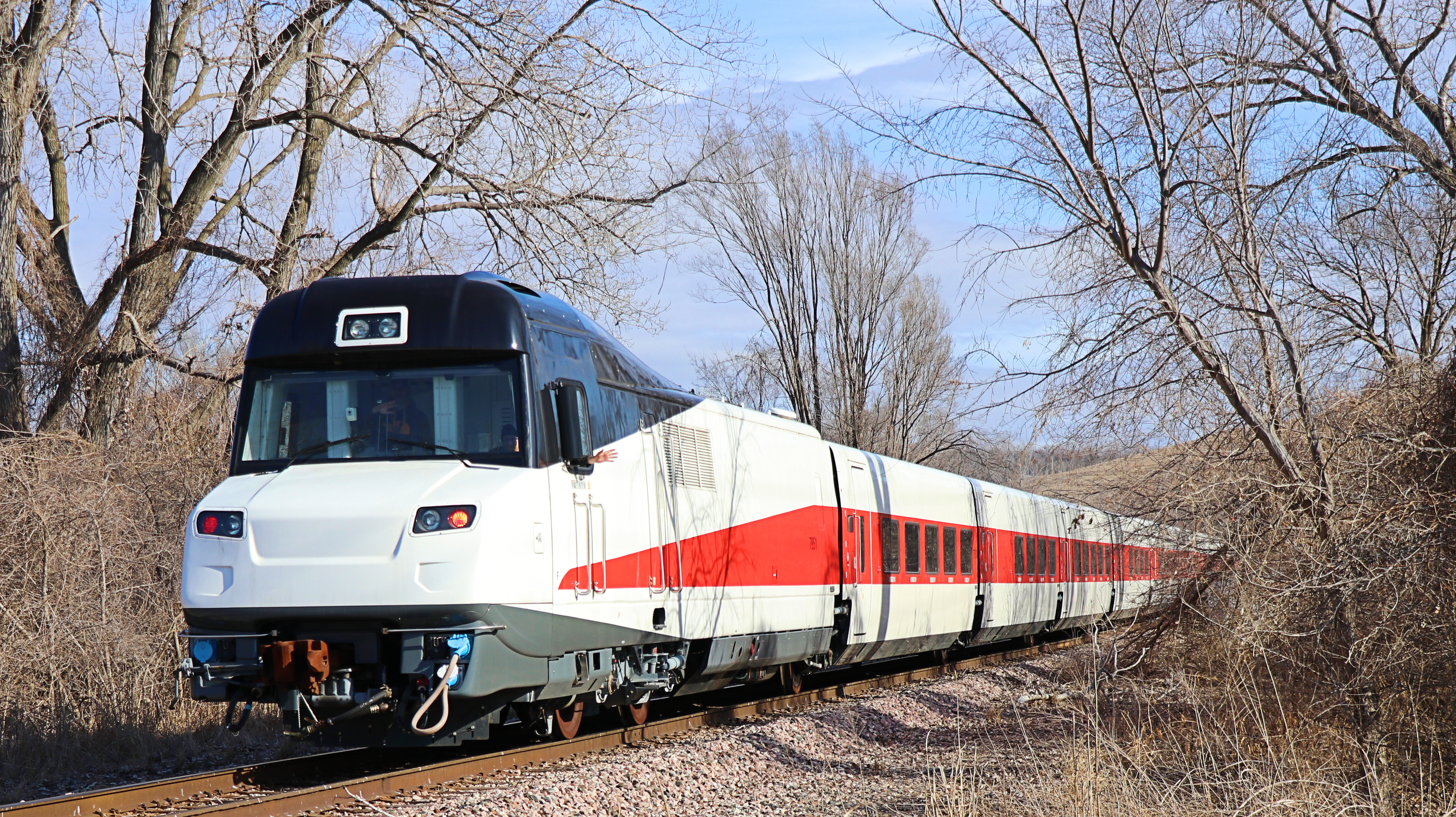
"Talgo VIII" (or "Talgo 8") train. This is one of the sets that was bought by Lagos Rail.

In September 2011, LAMATA announced that it would acquire some H5-series subway trains formerly used by the Toronto Transit Commission (TTC) for the Blue Line. The cars were to be refurbished in the United States and converted to standard gauge before being imported and put into service on the Blue and Red lines. The same contract also included an option for some H6-series subway cars from the TTC, however this has since been cancelled.

In January 2015, LAMATA opted for Chinese-built trains instead, ordering 15 electro-diesel multiple units from CRRC Dalian with an option for 14 more. About 76 H5 cars that had been taken for refurbishment to Buffalo, New York, have been scrapped by August 2015.

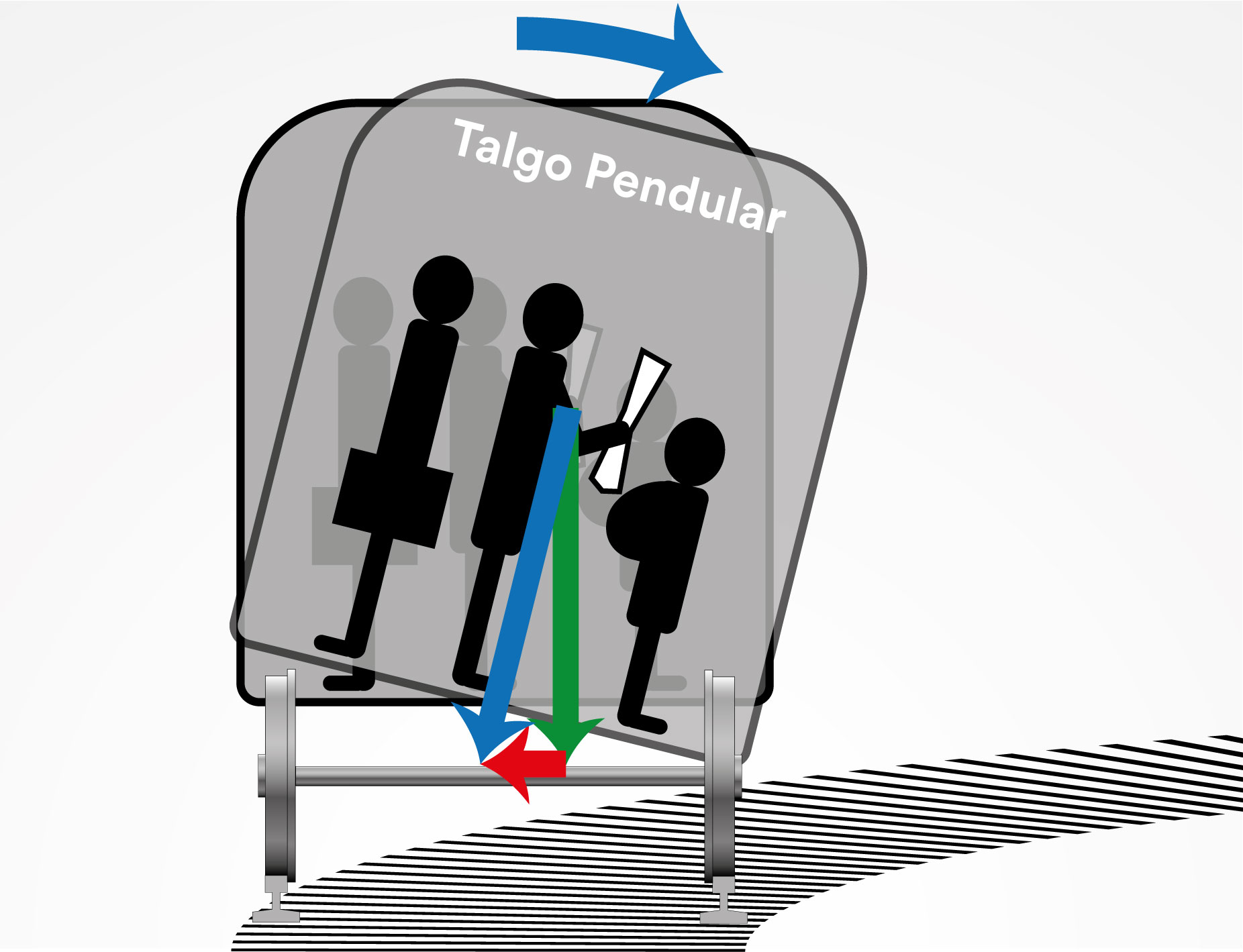
Working principle of the "Pendular" cars (green: gravity, red: centrifugal force in curve, blue: resulting force)

In August 2018, LAMATA signed an agreement with Alstom. As a part of the agreement, Alstom conducted a review of the rail lines, and electrification of a portion of the track was planned.

In January 2022, Lagos State Governor Babajide Sanwo-Olu visited the US state of Wisconsin, to purchase two Talgo VIII trainsets for service on the Red Line. They had been ordered by Wisconsin for use on the Amtrak Hiawatha in 2009, but were never placed in service, and were instead stored. Talgo VIII cars are based on the unique technology of the Talgo Pendular model, which leans into a curve resulting in less sideways force and a higher comfort for passengers when driving over a curvy track. The "leaning" of the car is passive and occurs because of the resulting force without electronics, sensors or engines.

In 2023, LAMATA bought 11 aging British Rail High Speed Trains (Class 43) locomotives and 11 Mark 3 coaches from the UK. Some of the Class 43s will be used to haul rakes of the Mark 3 coaches, while others will be used to haul the Talgo rakes.

== Routes ==
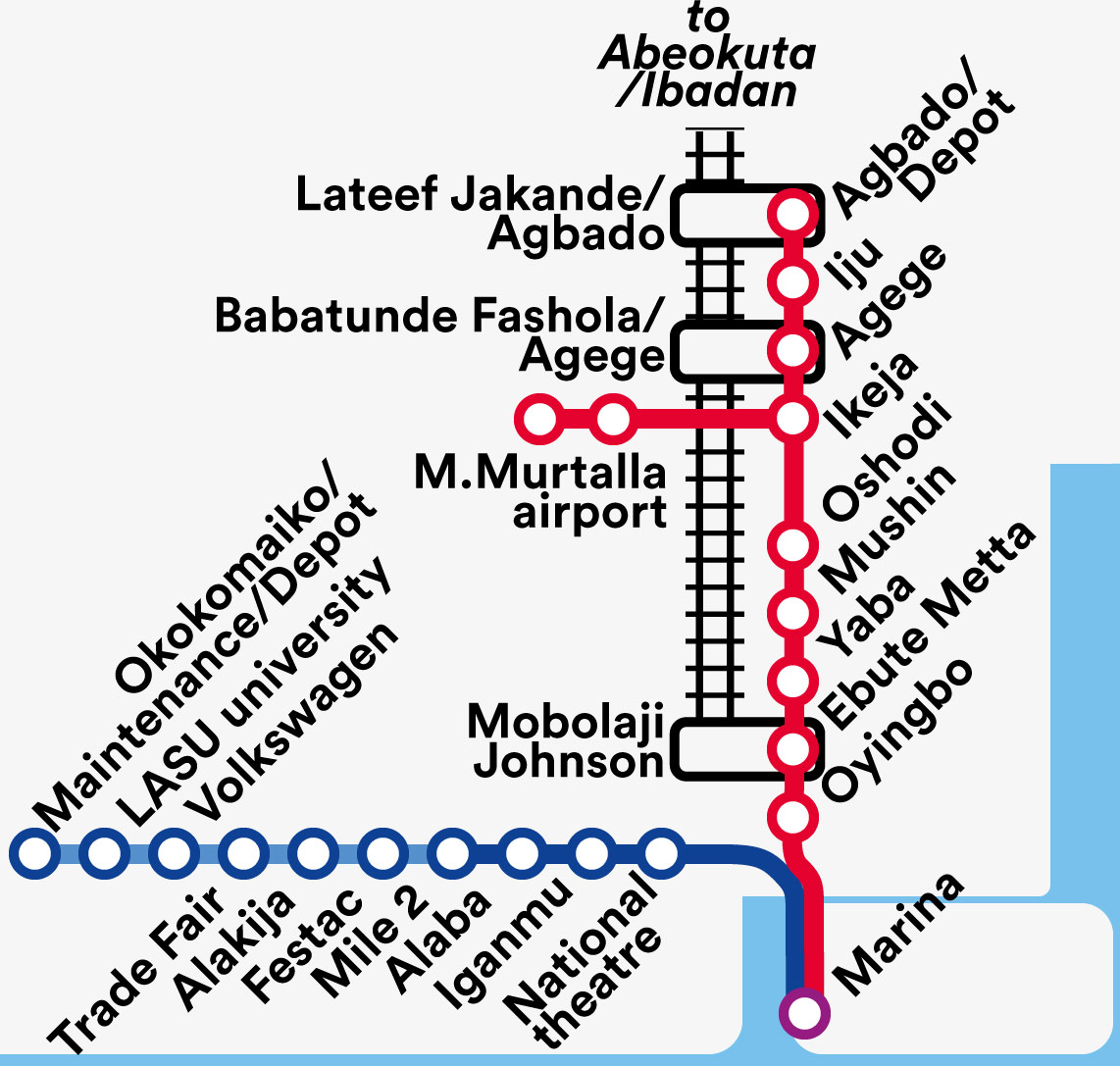
Blue line, Red Line railway stations and airport

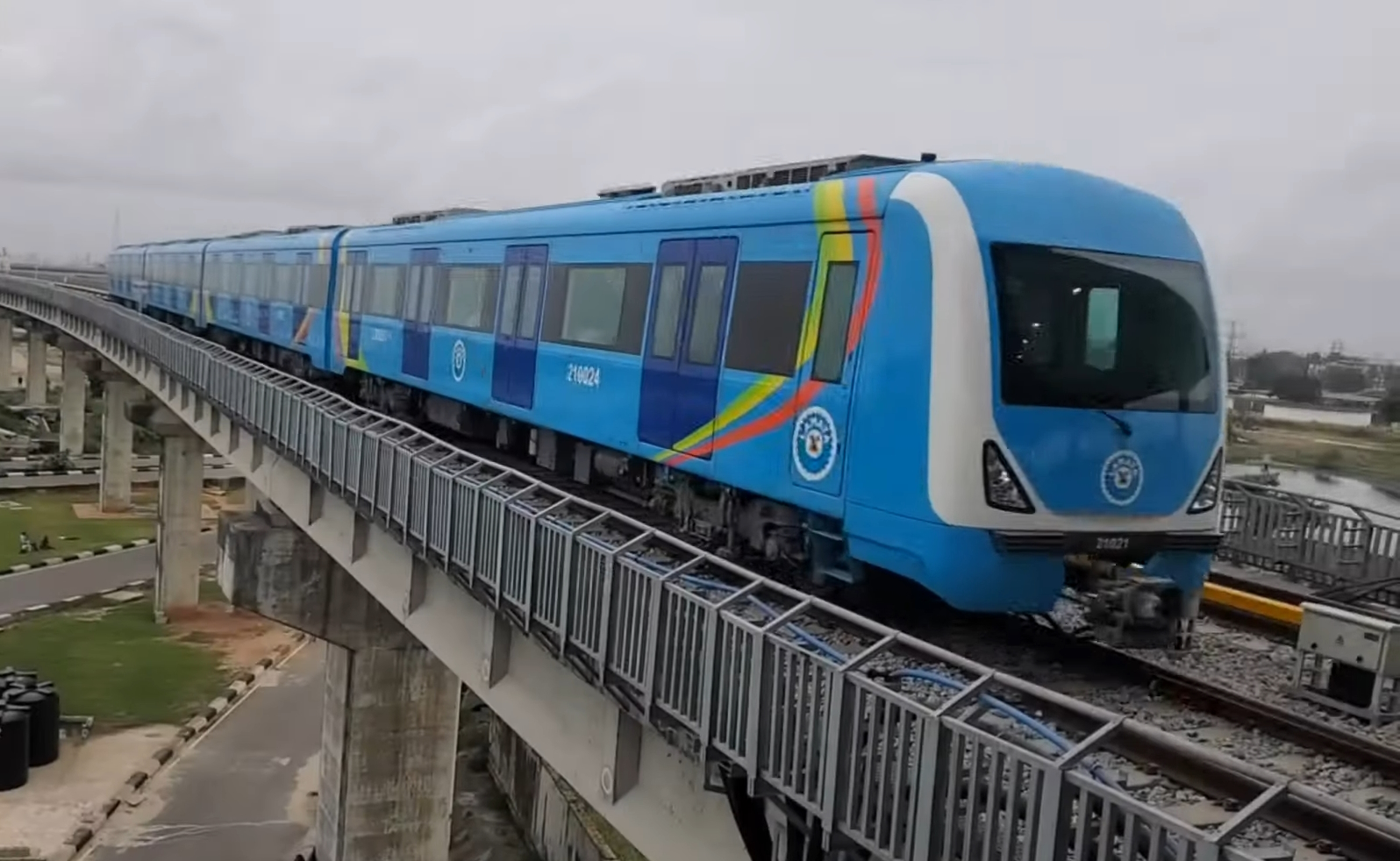
Lagos Blue Line in 2024

=== Blue Line: Okokomaiko - Marina ===
The Blue Line is the first line in the system and opened its first five stations on 4 September 2023. The entire planned route is 27 kilometres (17 mi) from Okokomaiko to Lagos Marina. Construction had been delayed due to lack of funds and was split into multiple phases.

=== Red Line: Agbado - Marina ===
The second line, the Red Line, runs from Marina to Agbado. The line shares the right-of-way with the Lagos–Kano Standard Gauge Railway. Like the Blue Line, construction of the Red Line has been split into multiple phases. Once all sections are completed, the line will reach a length of 37 km. Like the Blue Line, this line is being constructed by CCECC.

In September 2023, Governor Sanwo-Olu assured residents that the first phase of the line was 95% complete and would be finished by the end of the year. A ceremonial inauguration was held in February 2024, but regular passenger service from Agbado to Oyingbo started only on 15 October 2024. This first phase is 27 km in length and has 8 stations. Construction of the second phase, which will extend the line to Marina Station and connect it to the Blue Line, is currently ongoing.

==== Airport branch ====
The Airport Branch of the Red Line is intended to run from Ikeja to MMIA International Terminal.

=== Green Line: Marina - Lekki Free Trade Zone (Airport) (Planned) ===
The planned third line, the Green Line, will run 68 km from Marina to the Lekki Free Trade Zone, with a connection to the Blue Line at Marina. It will serve key areas, including Victoria Island, Lekki and Ajah. On 6 September 2024, the Lagos state government signed a Memorandum of Understanding (MoU) with China Harbour Engineering Company (CHEC) and the Ministry of Finance Incorporated (MOFI) to initiate construction, with the two companies leading on design, financing, and operation of the Green Line. On 10 April 2025, the state government unveiled the full plan for the Green Line, with an expected initial daily ridership of 500,000, as well as intent to complete the line in one phase.

=== Purple Line: Redemption Camp - Ojo ===
The Purple Line is a future 54.35-kilometre line and is developed by the Lagos Rail Mass Transit initiative managed by the Lagos Metropolitan Area Transport Authority (LAMATA). It runs from Redemption Camp to Ojo near Lagos State University for more interconnectivity across Lagos. It will be constructed after the Red, Blue and Green Lines. It is projected to carry 549,000 passengers per day, with up to 1.3 million by 2031.

=== Other planned routes ===
- Yellow Line: Ota, Ogun to National Theatre
- Orange Line: Ikeja to Agbowa-Ikosi

== See also ==
- LAMATA
- Abuja Light Rail
- Rail Transportation in Nigeria
- Rapid transit
- Lagos Bus Rapid Transit System
- Lagos State Ferry Services Corporation
