= Green Line (Lagos Transit) =

Future Metro service in Lagos, Nigeria

Overview
- Status: Planned
- Owner: LAMATA
- Termini: Marina; Lekki Free Trade Zone
- Color on map: Green
- Website: https://www.lamata-ng.com/

Service
- Type: Rapid transit
- System: Lagos Metro
- Daily ridership: 500,000 (Planned)

Technical
- Track length: 68 km (42 mi)
- Number of tracks: 2

The Green Line is a planned metro service in Lagos, Nigeria owned by Lagos Rail Mass Transit run by the Lagos Metropolitan Area Transport Authority (LAMATA). The line will run 68 km from Marina to the Lekki Free Trade Zone, with a connection to the Blue and Red Lines at Marina. It will serve key areas, including Victoria Island, Lekki and Ajah. China Harbour Engineering Company (CHEC) and the Ministry of Finance Incorporated (MOFI) are the two companies to initiate construction, with the companies leading on design, financing, and operation of the Green Line. On 10 April 2025, the state government unveiled the full plan for the Green Line, with an expected initial ridership of 500,000, as well as intent to complete the line in one phase.

== History ==
On 6 September 2024, the Lagos state government signed a Memorandum of Understanding (MoU) with China Harbour Engineering Company (CHEC) and the Ministry of Finance Incorporated (MOFI) to initiate construction, with the two companies leading on design, financing, and operation of the Green Line. On April 10 2025, The Lagos Metropolitan Area Transport Authority (LAMATA) held a workshop to discuss the Green Line rail project and revealed the 68-kilometer rail route plan to the public with an expected initial ridership of 500,000, as well as intent to complete the line in one phase.

== Development plan ==
Lagos State is financing construction of the Green Line with its own resources. Similar to the Purple Line, The proposed advantages of the Green line are that is will allow commuters to spend less time travelling in the area by avoiding traffic jams which can take many hours to get through, whilst also being cheaper. A journey that would have taken two hours in traffic can now be taken in 15-30 minutes and to Interchange with the new Lekki Airport. The trains will be electrified, and security will be provided to prevent vandalism.

=== Contractors ===
The contract was awarded to the China Harbour Engineering Company (CHEC), with advisory services being provided by Ministry of Finance Incorporated (MOFI).

=== Route ===
The Line has been planned to be built in one go with the $3 billion (₦180 billion) line stretching from Marina to The Lekki Free Trade Zone with the trains stopping at: Victoria Island, Civic Center, Lekki Phase 1, Freedom Way, Jakande Market, Chevron, Ajah, Ogombo, Sangotedo, Green Spring Lekki Campus, Lakowe, Onosa, Eleko, Ibeju, Okegun and Lekki Airport.
