= Blue Line (Lagos Transit) =

Metro service in Lagos, Nigeria

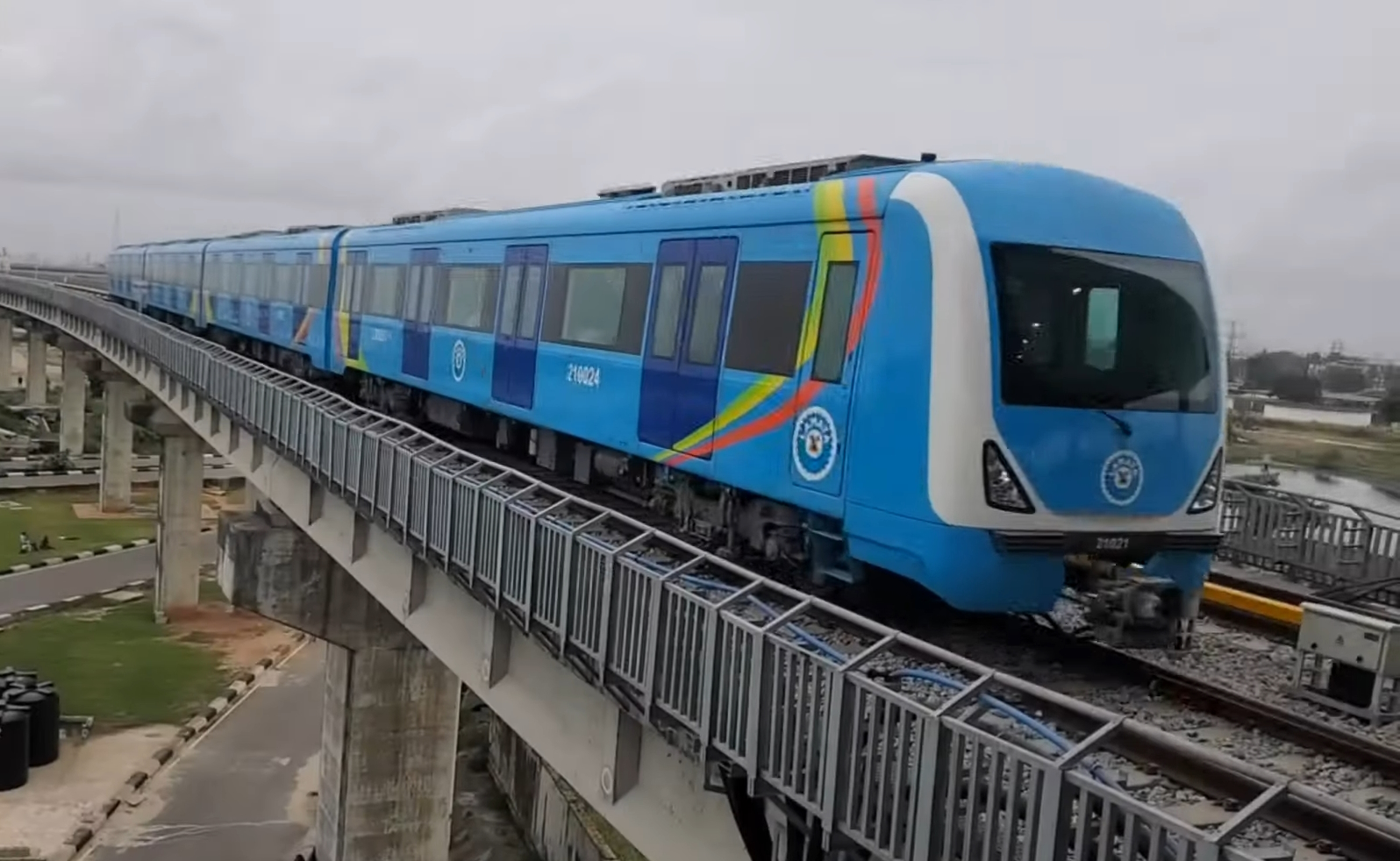
- Lagos Blue Line CRRC Dalian Class 210 train

Overview
- Status: Operational
- Termini: Marina; Miles 2
- Stations: 13 (5 operational, 8 under construction)

Service
- Type: Rapid transit
- System: Lagos Metro

History
- Commenced: 2009; 17 years ago
- Opened: 4 September 2023; 2 years ago
- Last extension: 4 September 2023; 2 years ago

Technical
- Line length: 27 km (17 mi)
- Number of tracks: 2
- Character: Fully Elevated and At-Grade
- Track gauge: 1,435 mm (4 ft 8 1/2 in)

The Blue Line is an electric rapid transit line that runs in Lagos, Nigeria. It is part of the Lagos Rail Mass Transit system run by the Lagos Metropolitan Area Transport Authority.

The first phase with five stations and 13 kilometres (8.1 mi) of track opened on 4 September 2023. The full line is set to be 27 kilometres (17 mi) and is expected to carry 500,000 passengers a day.

The line's Class 210 trains are made by CRRC Dalian and based on Chinese Type B trains from Tianjin Metro Line 2. They have a maximum speed of 100 km/h (62 mph), although they will only operate at 80 km/h (50 mph).

== History ==
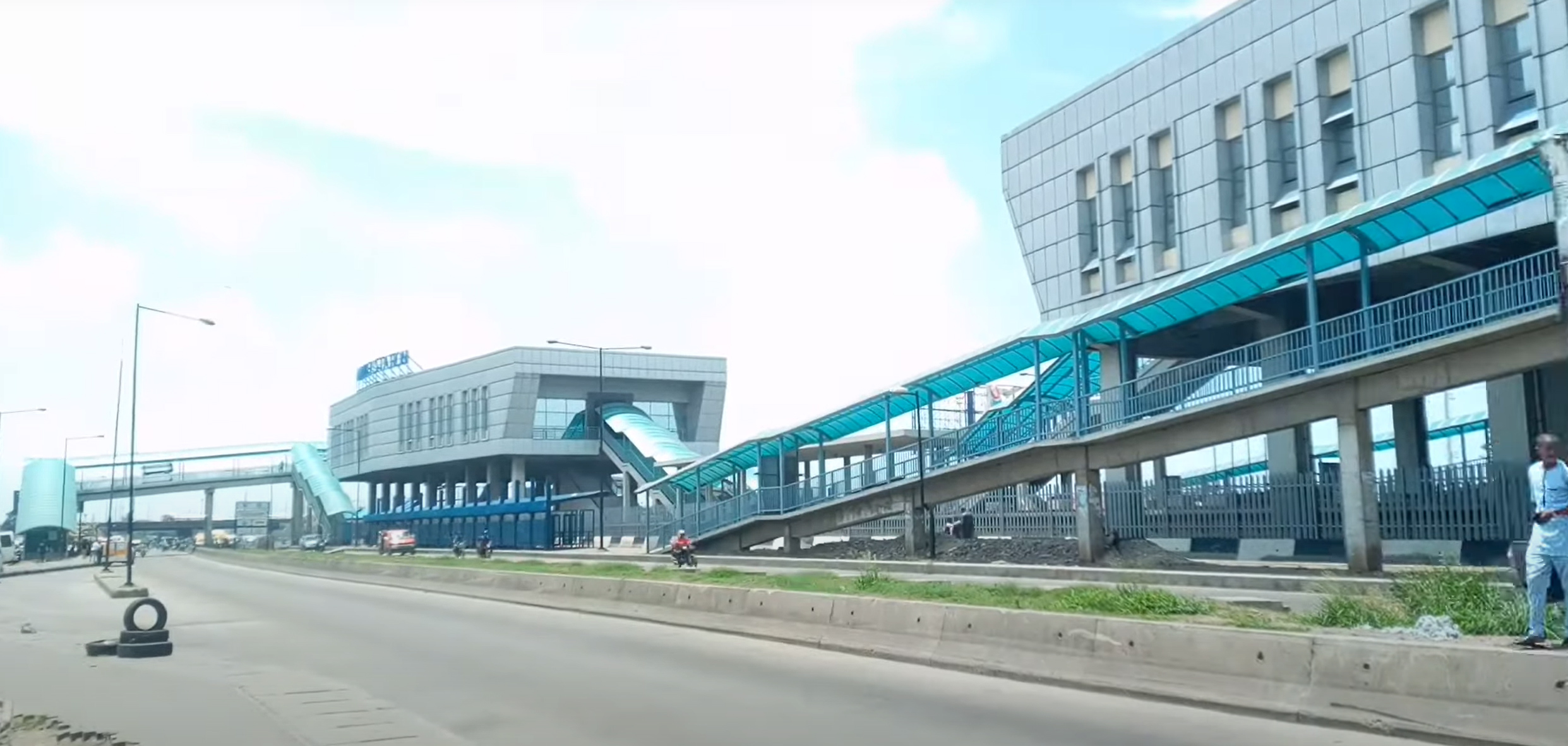
Light rail and bus station "Mile 2" - the prototype for many Blue Line stations

In April 2008, the Lagos State Government approved ₦ 70 billion for construction of the Okokomaiko-Iddo-Marina Line, with an estimated completion date of 2011. However, the project suffered many delays due to lack of funds. The opening date was revised to June 2013, then December 2016, then 2017. As of November 2016, only 16 km (9.9 mi) of the 27 km (16.8 mi) Blue Line had been completed. In August 2018, LAMATA signed an agreement with Alstom. As a part of the agreement, Alstom conducted a review of the rail lines, and electrification of a portion of the track was planned.

== Development plan ==
Lagos State is financing construction of the Blue Line with its own resources. The proposed advantages of the blue line are that is will allow commuters to spend less time travelling in the area by avoiding traffic jams which can take many hours to get through, whilst also being cheaper. A journey that would have taken two hours in traffic can now be taken in fifteen minutes. The trains are electrified, and security has been provided to prevent vandalism.

=== Contractors ===
The contract was awarded to the China Civil Engineering Construction Corporation (CCECC), with advisory services being provided by CPCS Transcom.

=== Rolling Stock ===
In September 2011, LAMATA announced that it would acquire some H5-series subway trains formerly used by the Toronto Transit Commission (TTC) for the Blue Line. The cars were to be refurbished in the United States and converted to standard gauge before being imported and put into service on the Blue and Red lines. The same contract also included an option for some H6-series subway cars from the TTC, however this has since been cancelled.

In January 2015, LAMATA opted for Chinese-built trains instead, ordering 15 electro-diesel multiple units from CRRC Dalian with an option for 14 more. About 76 H5 cars that had been taken for refurbishment to Buffalo, New York, have been scrapped by August 2015.

=== Planned route ===
The Blue Line will run 27 kilometres (17 mi) from Okokomaiko to Lagos Marina, with 13 stations and an end-to-end journey time of 35 minutes. The entire Blue Line will operate over a secure and exclusive right-of-way, with no level crossings and no uncontrolled access by pedestrians or vehicles. The route will run on the surface in the central reservation of the Lagos-Badagry Expressway between Igbo-Elerin Road (Okokomaiko) and Iganmu. The line will then be elevated from Iganmu along the south side of the expressway passing the junction with Eric Moore Road, crossing just south of the National Theatre to Iddo, then south to Lagos Island with a terminal at Marina connecting with the Red Line. A Maintenance and Storage Facility (MSF) will be constructed at Okokomaiko, with a track connection from the Blue Line to the depot.

=== Phase I ===
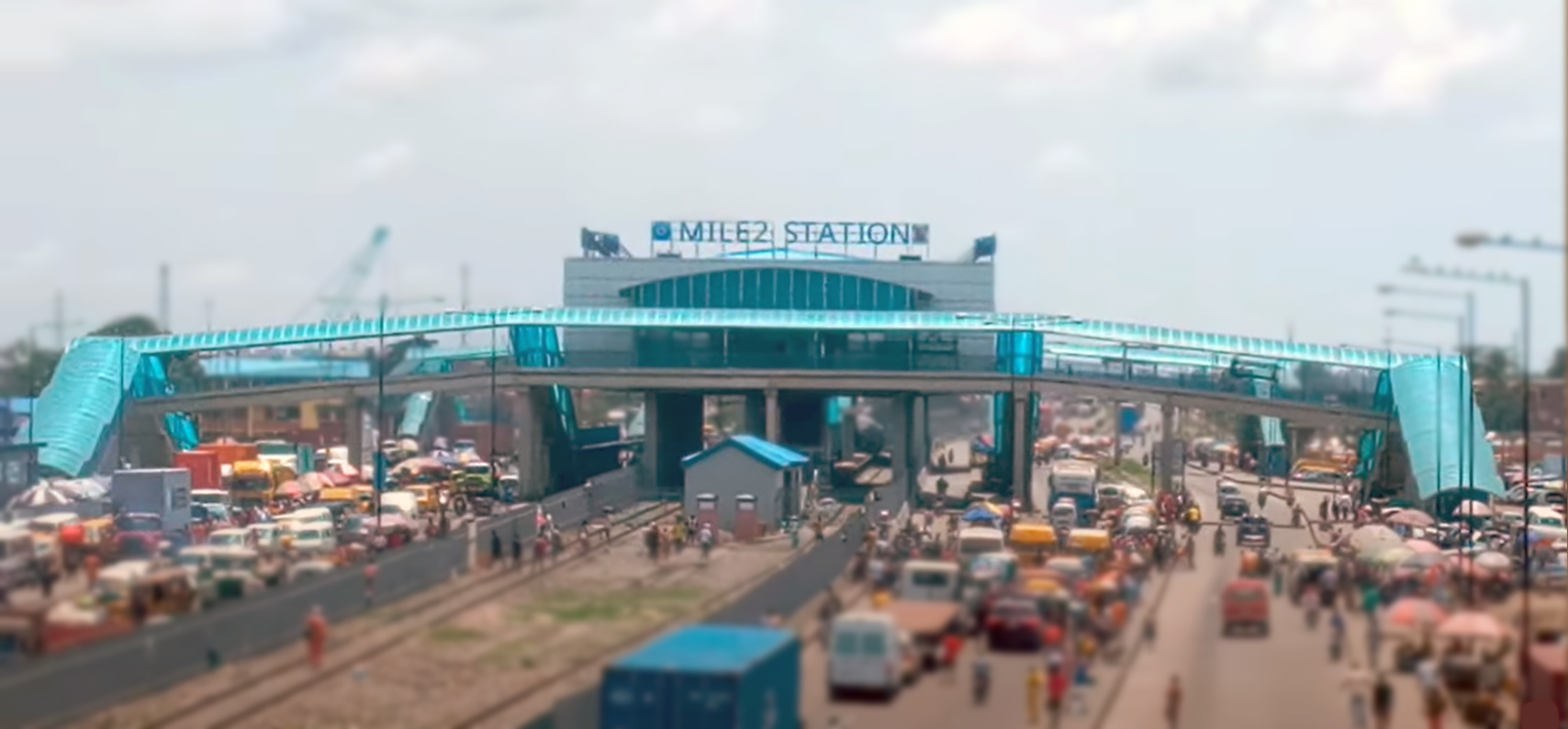
Station Mile 2, seen from the overpass

The first phase was opened for testing on 21 December 2022. This phase travels 13 kilometres (8.1 mi) from Lagos Marina to Mile 2 interchanging with the Red and Green Lines. The 5 stations being opened are: Lagos Marina, National Theatre, Orile Iganmu, Suru Alaba, Mile 2. The line underwent testing during December 2022 and January 2023 before opening to passengers on 4 September 2023.

==== Operational Status ====
The Blue line opened on 4 September 2023. In its first year (ending in September 2024), the Blue Line carried roughly 2 million passengers.

Starting in August 2024, 72 train services run every day, an increase in frequency from 54 previously.

As of 3 September 2025, the state transportation authority reported carrying 5million passengers in the blue line's two years of operation. As of February 2026, published LAMATA schedules show a departure in each direction roughly every 23 minutes during operating hours, with about 36 trips in each direction.

=== Phase II ===
Construction of the second phase, from Mile 2 to Okokomaiko, to connect it with the future Purple Line commenced after the first phase opened for passenger service. Construction of this project began in 2023 and is currently expected to be completed in 2027.
