= Red Line (Lagos Transit) =

Heavy Rail service in Lagos, Nigeria

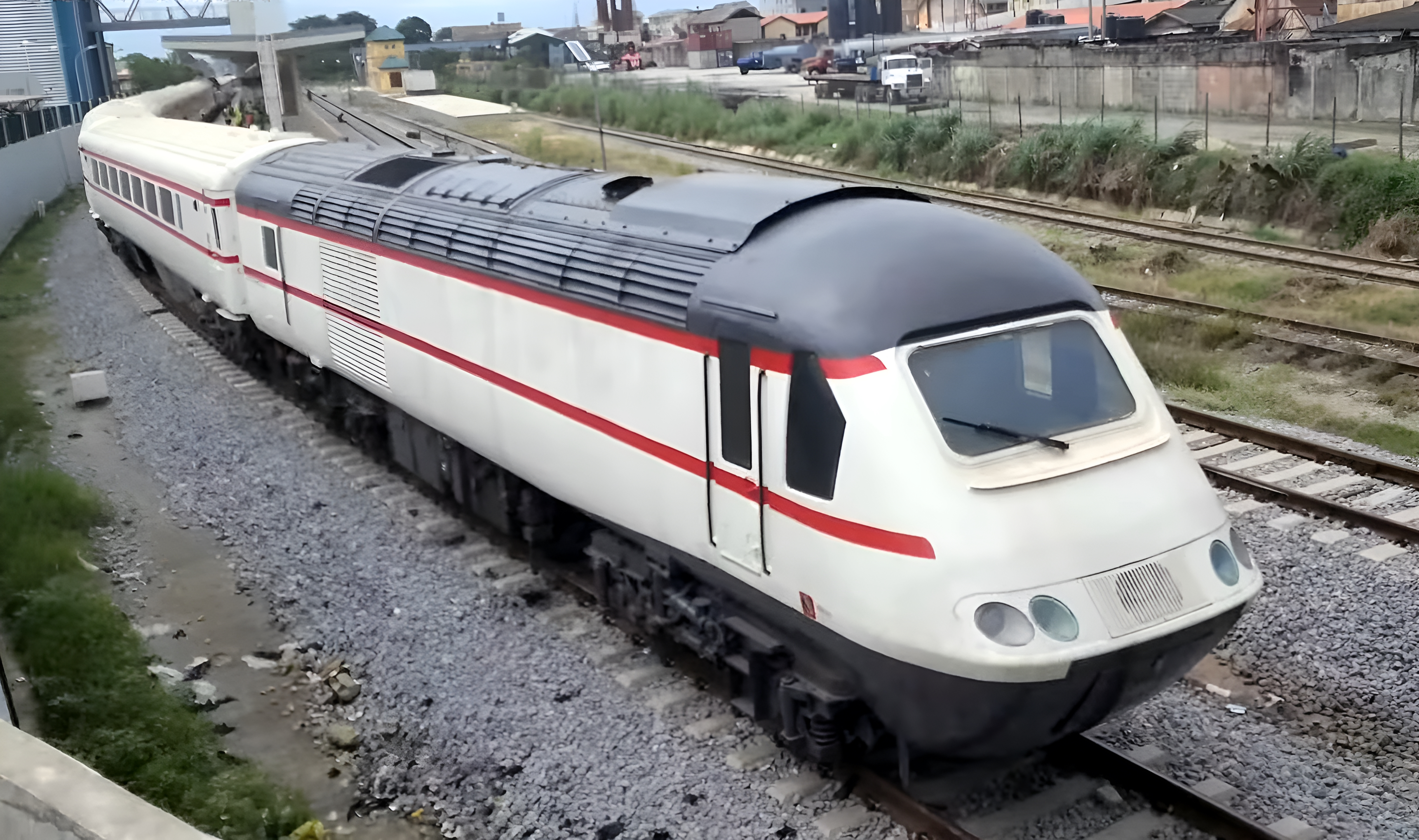
- An InterCity 125 HST on the Lagos Red Line

Overview
- Status: Operational
- Owner: LAMATA
- Termini: Oyingbo; Marina
- Stations: 12 (8 operational, 4 under construction)
- Color on map: Red

Service
- Type: Commuter Rail
- System: Lagos Metro

History
- Work began: 2021; 5 years ago
- Opened: 15 October 2024; 2 years ago

Technical
- Line length: 37 km (23 mi)
- Number of tracks: 2
- Character: Elevated, at-grade
- Track gauge: 1,435 mm (4 ft 8 1/2 in)
- Operating speed: 150 km/h (93 mph)

The Red Line is a heavy rail service that runs from Marina to Agbado in Lagos, Nigeria and is developed by the Lagos Rail Mass Transit initiative managed by the Lagos Metropolitan Area Transport Authority (LAMATA). The line shares the right-of-way with the Lagos–Kano Standard Gauge Railway. Like the Blue Line, construction of the Red Line has been split into two phases. Once all sections are completed, the line will reach a length of 37 km. Similar to the Blue Line, this line is being constructed by CCECC.

In September 2023, Governor Sanwo-Olu assured residents that the first phase of the line was 95% complete and would be finished by the end of the year. A ceremonial inauguration was held in February 2024, but regular passenger service from Agbado to Oyingbo started only on 15 October 2024; connecting with the future Purple Line at Agege. This first phase is 27 km in length and has 8 stations. Construction of the second phase, which will extend the line to Marina Station and provide an interchange with the Blue and future Green Line, is currently ongoing.

== History ==
The Red Line is a commuter rail system in Lagos, Nigeria, developed as part of the Lagos Rail Mass Transit initiative managed by the Lagos Metropolitan Area Transport Authority (LAMATA) Initially proposed in 2008, the rail system aimed to enhance transportation efficiency. Construction of the Red Line officially began in 2021 costsing around $135 million. In January 2022, LAMATA acquired two Talgo VIII trains for the project and Intercity 125 High-Speed Trains (HSTs) from the UK in 2023, getting 11 locomotives and 11 coaches through the ROMIC Group. These trains were refurbished for use in Lagos' rail system.

Contributing to its development, the Red Line was inaugurated on 29 February 2024, and the first phase opened to the public on 15 October 2024. The 37-kilometre route runs from Agbado to Oyingbo. Unlike the electric-powered Blue Line, the Red Line operates with Diesel Multiple Units (DMU's) sharing tracks with the Lagos-Kano Standard Gauge Railway. The project also includes 10 vehicular bridges and pedestrian crossings to support safe transit. Designed to improve mobility in Lagos, the Red Line is expected to contribute to reducing travel times and road congestion while facilitating urban transportation.

== Development plan ==
Lagos State is financing construction of the Red Line with its own resources. The proposed advantages of the Red Line are that it will allow commuters to spend less time travelling in the area by avoiding traffic jams, which can take many hours to get through, whilst also being cheaper. A journey that would have taken two hours in traffic can now be taken in 15-30 minutes. Security has been provided to prevent vandalism.

=== Contractors ===
The contract was awarded to the China Civil Engineering Construction Corporation (CCECC), with advisory services being provided by CPCS Transcom.

=== Phase I ===
The 27-kilometre-long phase cost around $135 million and took around 3 years to build and had an Inauguration Day in February 2024 from the President of Nigeria. Testing services were held from August 28 to September 27 of that year to ensure everything was working smoothly. Phase 1 commercial services were opened on 15 October 2024, with the line stretching from Oyingbo to Agbado with stations such as Iju, Agege, Ikeja, MMIA Domestic Airport, Oshodi, Mushin and Yaba; connecting with the future Purple Line at Agege.

=== Phase II ===
Phase 2 is currently under construction, stretching 10 kilometers with the line going from Oyingbo to Marina to interchange with the Blue and Green Lines. Stations include: Ebute Metta, Iddo and Ebute Ero. However, plans to switch the terminal from Marina to National Theatre have been suggested.

== Rolling stock ==
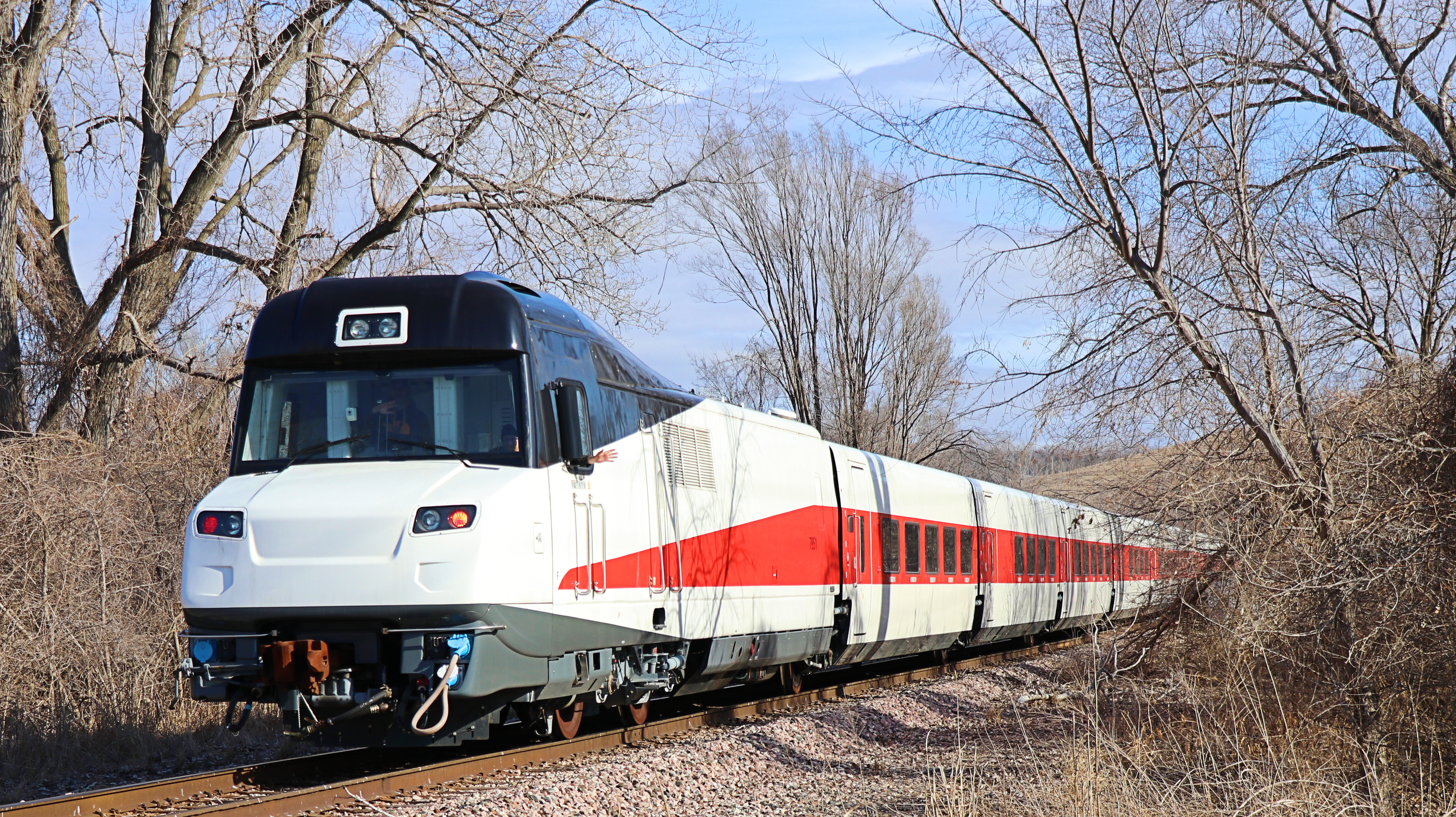
Talgo train, before it was exported to Lagos

The Red Line has two types of trains.

In January 2022, Lagos State Governor Babajide Sanwo-Olu travelled to Wisconsin to acquire two Talgo VIII trainsets for use on the Red Line. These sets had originally been ordered by Wisconsin in 2009 for the Amtrak Hiawatha service, but they were never introduced into operation and remained in storage instead.

Talgo VIII coaches use the distinctive system, the Talgo Pendular model, which allows the cars to lean naturally into curves, reducing lateral forces and improving passenger comfort on winding track. This tilting action is entirely passive, relying on the dynamics of the train rather than any electronic control, sensors, or motors.

In 2023, LAMATA purchased 11 British Rail Class 43 powercars and 11 British Rail Mark 3 carriages last operated by Arriva CrossCountry and First Great Western from Angel Trains.

== Stations ==
Zones	Station	Connections
2	Agbado	Lagos-Ibadan train
2	Iju	
2, 1B	Agege	Lagos-Ibadan train
1, 2B	Ikeja	
1, 2B	Oshodi	
1, 2B	Mushin	
1	Yaba	
1	Oyingbo	

Note that if a station is in zone 1, a zone 1B ticket can also be used, and if it is in zone 2, a zone 2B ticket can also be used.

The Lagos-Ibadan train stops at Agbado, Agege, and also at Mobolaji Johnson station in Ebute-Metta, which is located between Yaba and Oyingbo.

== Operation ==
=== Timetable ===
Timetable

Since 10 February 2025, the Red Line has operated 5 morning trips (3 inbound to Oyingbo, 2 outbound to Agbado) and 4 evening trips (2 in each direction), and has improved the travel time to 50 minutes, dwelling 2 minutes at each station.

=== Fares ===
The fares are based on zone. Additionally, there are "B" zones which overlap the normal zones, allowing travel, for example, between Abgado and Mushin using a zone 2B ticket.

Distance	Longest allowed trip	Price
1 stop	(1 stop)	N350
Zone 2	Agbado-Ikeja	N500
Zone 2B	Agbado-Mushin	N750
Zone 1	Ikeja-Oyingbo	N500
Zone 1B	Agege-Oyingbo	N750
Both zones	Agbado-Oyingbo	N1000
