= Zhang Xigang =

Chinese bridge engineer

- Born: March 1962 (age 64); Xuchang, Henan, China
- Education: Tongji University
- Scientific career
- Fields: Bridge
- Workplaces: China Communications Construction

Chinese name
- Traditional Chinese: 張喜剛
- Simplified Chinese: 张喜刚
Transcriptions
Standard Mandarin
- Hanyu Pinyin: Zhāng Xǐgāng

Zhang Xigang (Chinese: 张喜刚; born March 1962) is a Chinese bridge engineer who is the chief engineer of China Communications Construction. He is a member of the China Highway and Transportation Society (CHTS) and Chinese Civil Engineering Society (CCES).

== Biography ==
Zhang was born in Xuchang, Henan, in March 1962. After the resumption of National College Entrance Examination, he enrolled at Tongji University, where he obtained his bachelor of engineering degree in July 1983. He served in various posts in the CCCC Highway Consultants CO., Ltd. before serving as chief engineer of China Communications Construction.

== Contributions ==
He was the chief architect of Sutong Yangtze River Bridge. He also participated in the design of Hangzhou Bay Bridge, Junshan Yangtze River Bridge, and Runyang Yangtze River Bridge.

== Honours and awards ==
- December 30, 2016 "National Engineering Survey and Design Master" by the Ministry of Housing and Urban-Rural Development
- November 22, 2019 Member of the Chinese Academy of Engineering (CAE)
