= Redeemed Christian Church of God =

Pentecostal megachurch and denomination

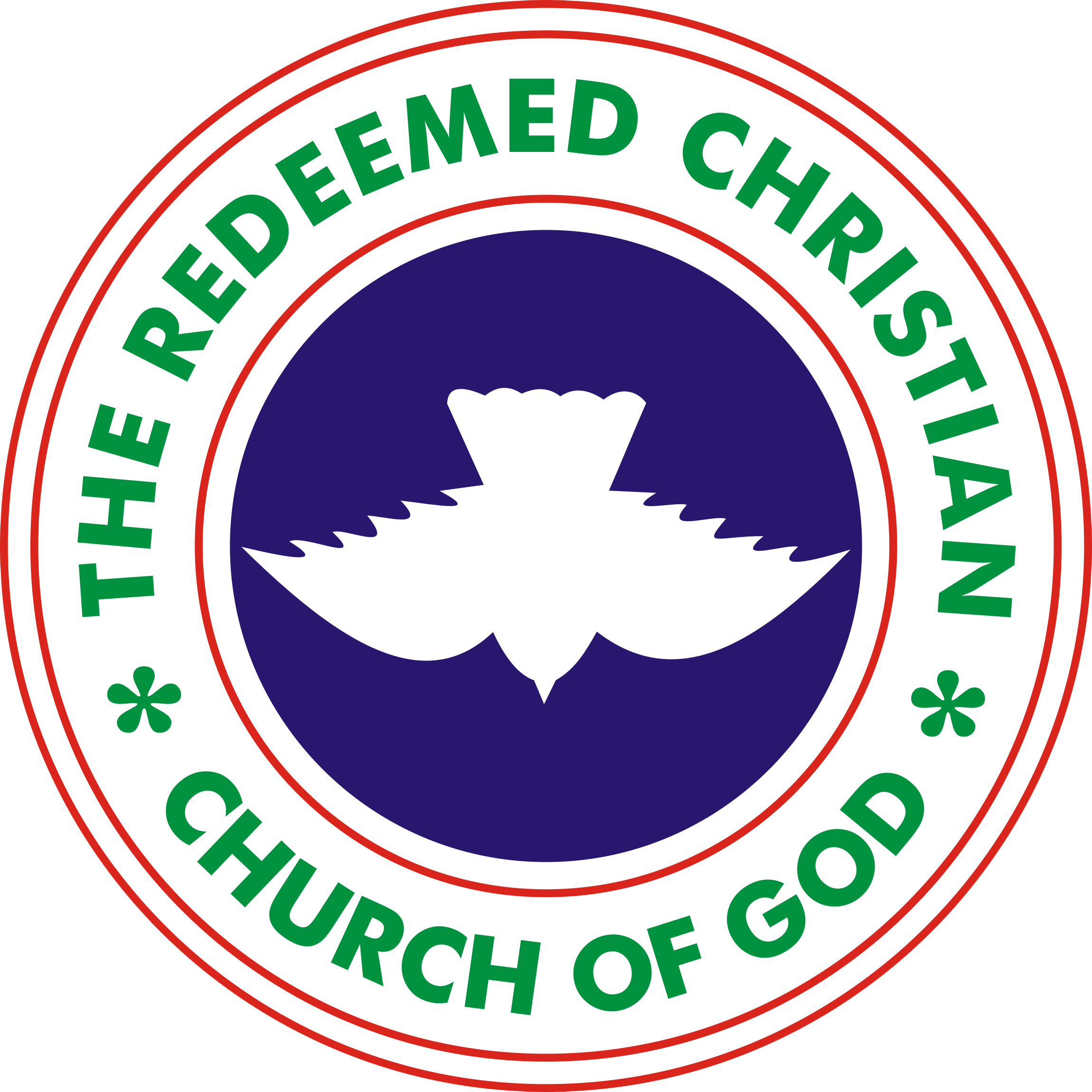
- Abbreviation: RCCG
- Type: Christianity
- Classification: Protestant
- Orientation: Holiness Pentecostal
- Scripture: Bible
- Theology: Evangelical
- Governance: Synod
- General Overseer: Enoch Adejare Adeboye
- Region: Worldwide, especially Nigeria
- Headquarters: National Headquarters: 1-5 Redemption Way (formerly 1A Cemetery Street), Ebute Metta, Lagos, Lagos State; International Headquarters: Redemption City of God, Kilometer 46, Lagos-Ibadan Expressway, Mowe, Nigeria
- Founder: Josiah Akindayomi
- Origin: 1952; Lagos, Nigeria
- Congregations: 51,580 (2021)
- Members: 9,938,617 (2021)
- Tertiary institutions: Redeemer's University
- Seminaries: Redeemed Christian Bible College
- Official website: www.rccg.org

The Redeemed Christian Church of God (RCCG) is a holiness pentecostal megachurch and denomination headquartered at the Redemption City of God in Mowe, Nigeria. With presence in 197 countries and territories of the world and more than 5 million members in Nigeria alone, it is one of the biggest church denominations in the world with over 9 million members worldwide.

After the death of founder Pa Josiah Akindayomi in 1980, pastor E.A. Adeboye, a former university lecturer, became its General Overseer in 1981.

== History ==
The RCCG was founded in 1952 by Rev. Josiah Olufemi Akindayomi (1909–1980).

Adeboye was a mathematics lecturer at the University of Lagos and had joined the church in 1973. Adeboye was initially a Yoruba-to-English interpreter for Akindayomi's sermons. He was ordained a pastor of the church in 1975. His appointment as the leader (styled 'General Overseer') of the church in 1981, was formalized by the posthumous reading of Akindayomi's sealed pronouncement. In 1990, the Redeemed Christian Church of God Bible School was founded.

Andrew Rice, writing in The New York Times, calls the RCCG "one of [Africa's] most vigorously expansionary religious movements, a homegrown Pentecostal denomination that is crusading to become a global faith". The church's mission statement states that "In every household, there will be at least one member of Redeemed Christian Church of God in the whole world."

In 2008, the RCCG had more than 14,000 churches and five million members in Nigeria, and as at 2024, it is present in more than 190 countries.

The international church is structured in different areas throughout the world. The local churches are grouped into regions, with 59 regions currently in Nigeria after the 2024 Annual Convention of the church, held in August. It is also organised throughout most of the world. Notable special spiritual programs are the "Holy Ghost Service", which holds on the first Friday of every month in Nigeria. Others include the annual "Holy Ghost Convention" that holds in August and the "Holy Ghost Congress" which holds in December.

== Beliefs ==
The RCCG website outlines its beliefs in the Bible and the Holy Trinity, that the devil exists, that God formed man in his image, in repentance, in cleansing from sins by God's grace, in sanctification, water baptism, Holy Spirit baptism, restitution and that God can heal without medicine (by His divine intervention e.g. through prayer). The church also believes in philanthropy; its charity arm, known as His Love Foundation, focuses its social intervention in the education, health, social entreprise and rehabilitation.

== See also ==
- List of the largest evangelical churches
- List of the largest evangelical church auditoriums
- Christ Apostolic Church
- The Redeemed Evangelical Mission
