= Redemption City of God =

Church grounds in Mowe, Ogun State, Nigeria

Redemption City of God (formerly known as Redemption Camp) is a modern, self-sustained private city and the international headquarters of the Redeemed Christian Church of God (RCCG). It is the largest church-owned singular property in the world, with a total area of 2,500 hectares, significantly surpassing other large religious landmasses such as Vatican City (48.99 hectares), Canaanland (2,000 hectares), Loveworld City, Asese (25 hectares), and many others. Located in Mowe, Ogun State, Nigeria, it serves as the primary functional headquarters of the RCCG, which is an evangelical pentecostal megachurch, currently active in 197 countries of the world, with over 9 million members as of 2026. It has the geographical coordinates of longitude 3.3958 and latitude 6.4531. The postal code (postcode) of the Redemption City is 110115.

The facility opened in 1983 and has since expanded to over 2500 hectares. The entire RCCG camp site (over 2,500Ha) is owned by RCCG Mission, with certificate of Occupancy number 23876 issued by the Ogun State Government of Nigeria on 4 August 1998.

The Redemption City has over 5,000 houses, roads, rubbish collection, police station, hospital, supermarkets, banks, a fun fair, a post office, schools, printing press, Redeemed Bible College, and a power plant. As at 2018, there were about 12,000 people living within the Redemption City.

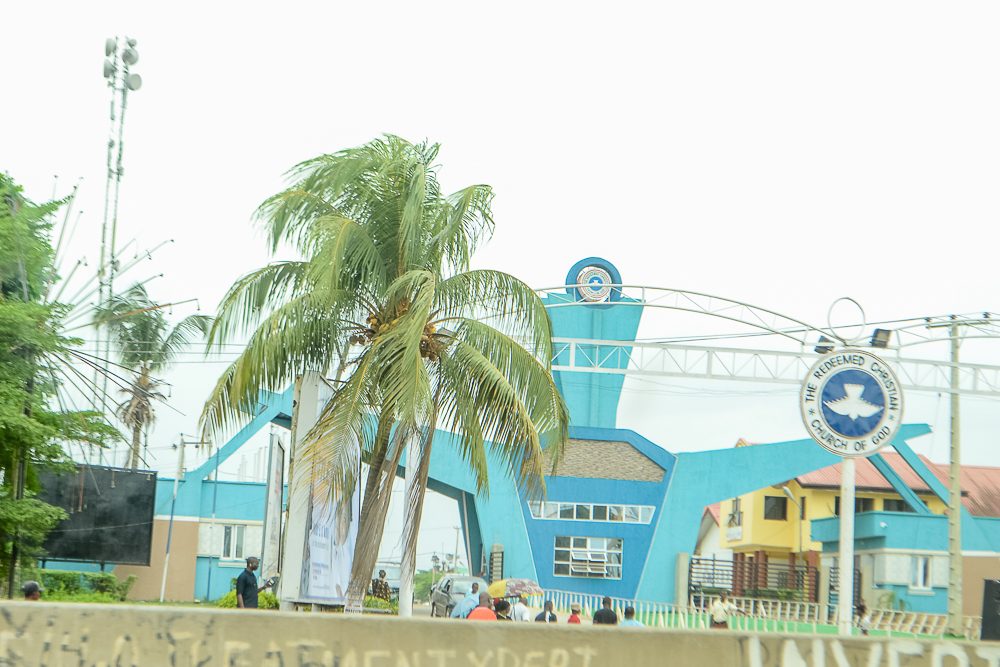
Front view of Redemption City

As of March 2023, it is now estimated that the Redemption City has about 200,000 inhabitants.

== History ==
Speaking at the Nigerian Independence Day service on 1 October 2017, at the Redeemed Christian Church of God (RCCG) National Headquarters in Ebute Meta, Lagos, the General Overseer of the Church, Pastor Enoch Adejare Adeboye, shared the testimony of how the Church bought the land for the Camp.

According to him, he refused to borrow money for the land they originally intended to buy at Iju, Lagos, which was then worth N54,000, even though he didn't even have N54 at that time. Instead, he held on to his faith, which eventually paid off.

In his words, "When this place (Ebute-meta) became too small, I asked my elders to look for a bigger space. So, they eventually saw some land around Iju for N54,000. Funny enough, I was not even having even N54 at that time. My elders were angry with me because I refused to borrow. In fact, if our church was the kind where they vote, I’d have been impeached because I told them I was not going to borrow."

"A few days later, a member was going to Ibadan from Lagos and he saw the land and called that the people were ready to accept N6,000. I told him not to even negotiate, and we quickly paid for it. That is our Redemption Camp today."

On Tuesday 9 August 2022, the general overseer of the church Pastor E A Adeboye renamed the Redemption Camp as Redemption City.

== Photo Gallery of Redemption camp ==
(Note that the auditorium pictures are of the old auditorium)

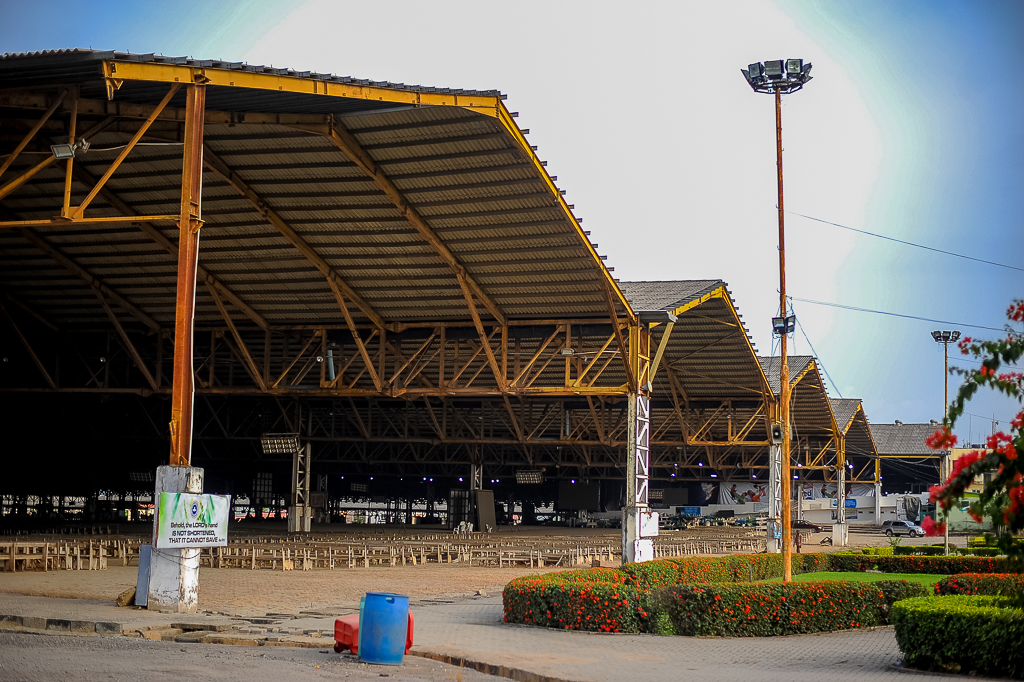

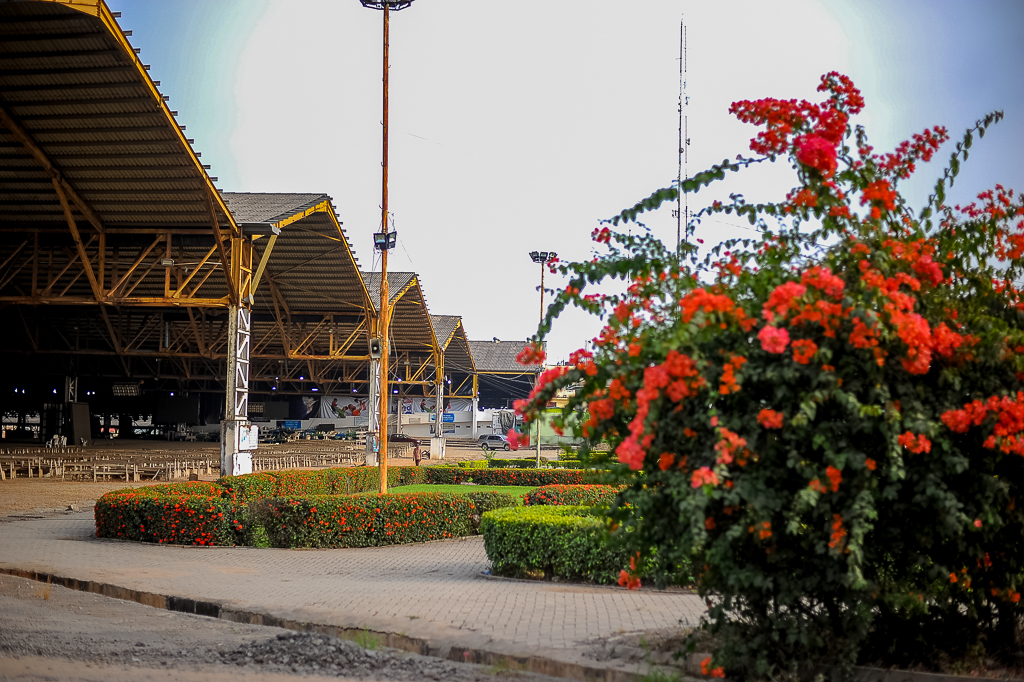

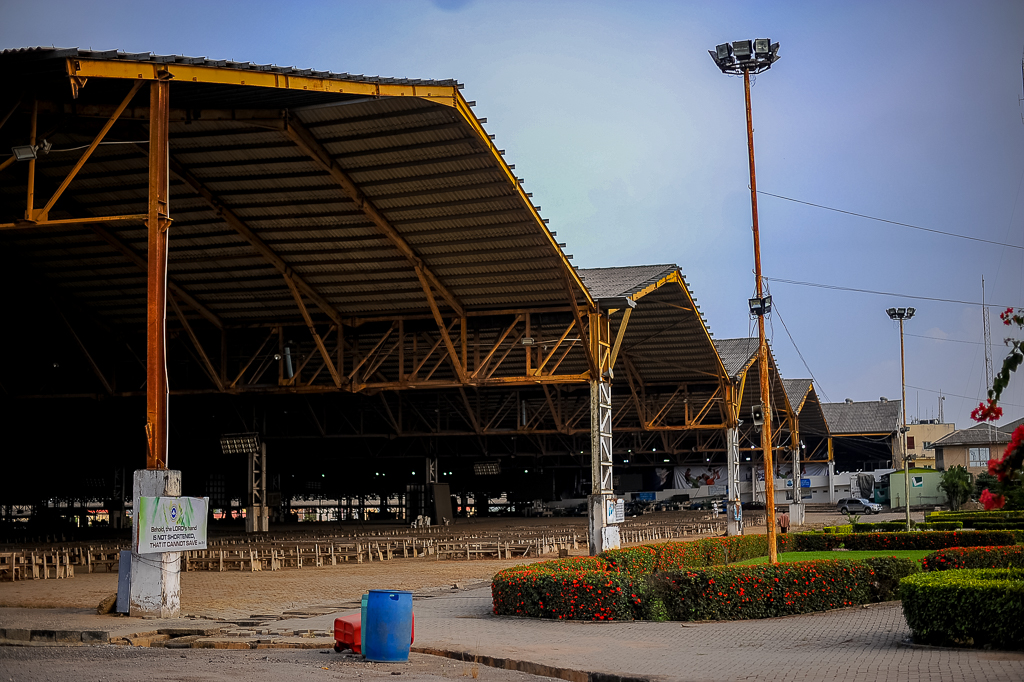

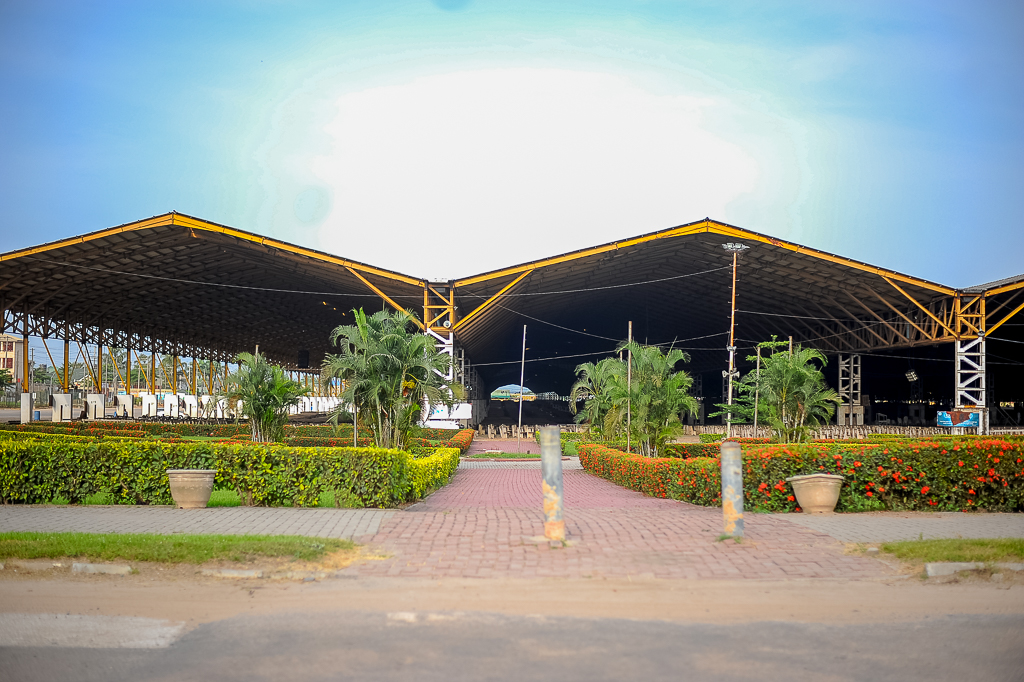

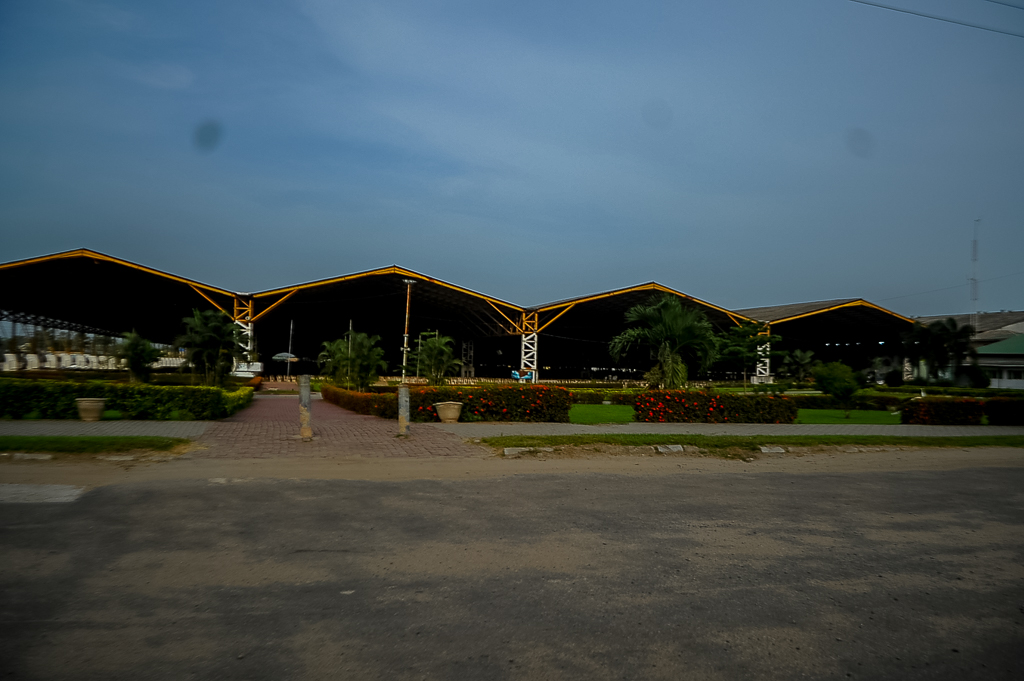

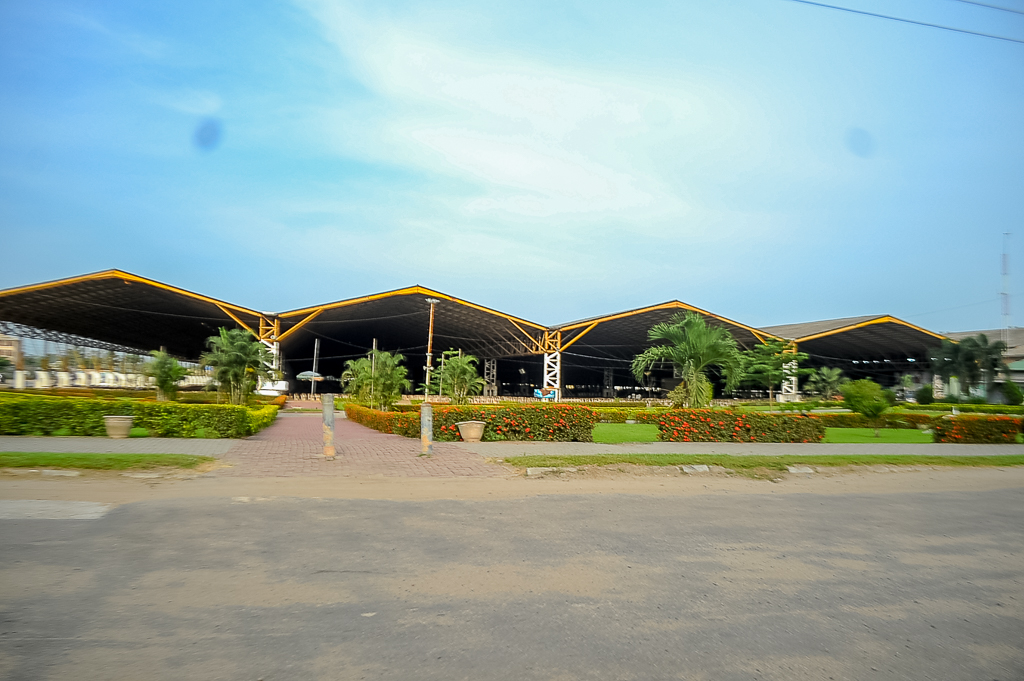

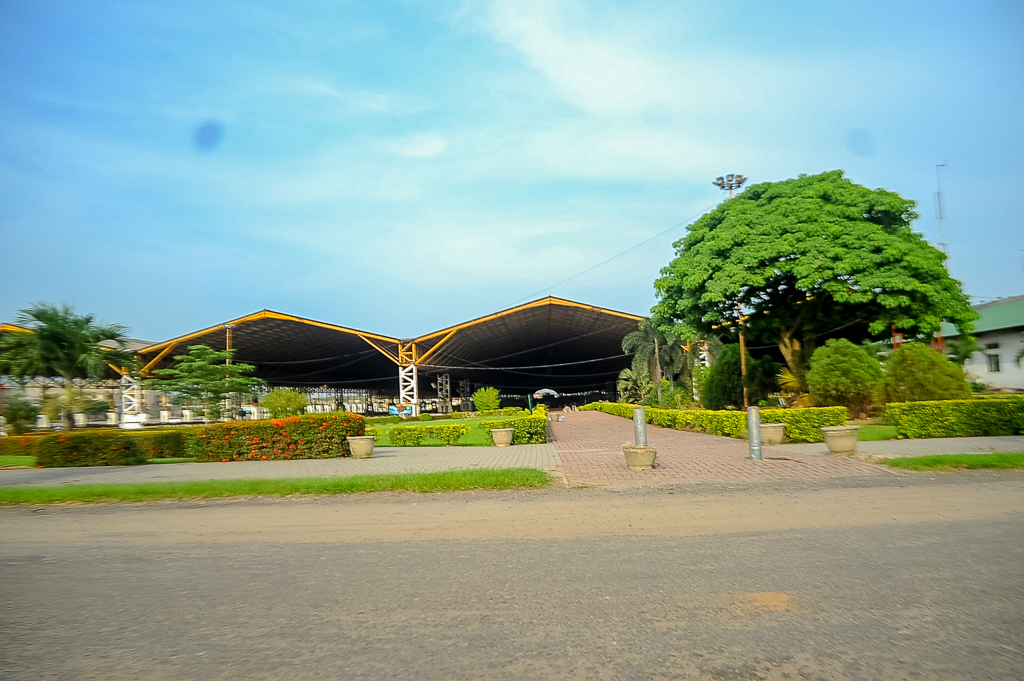

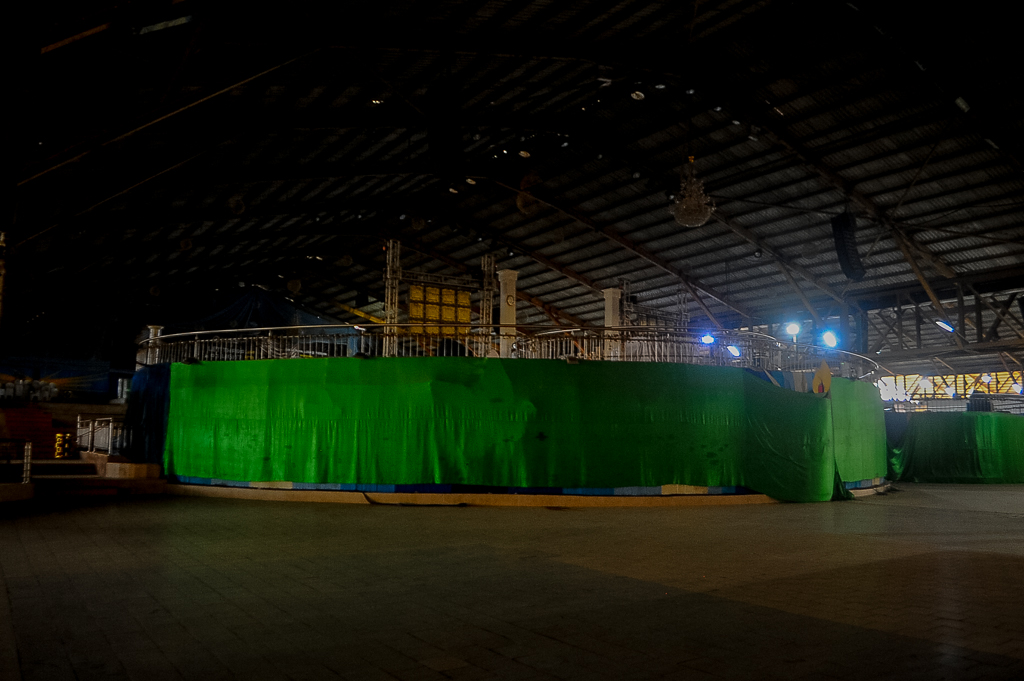

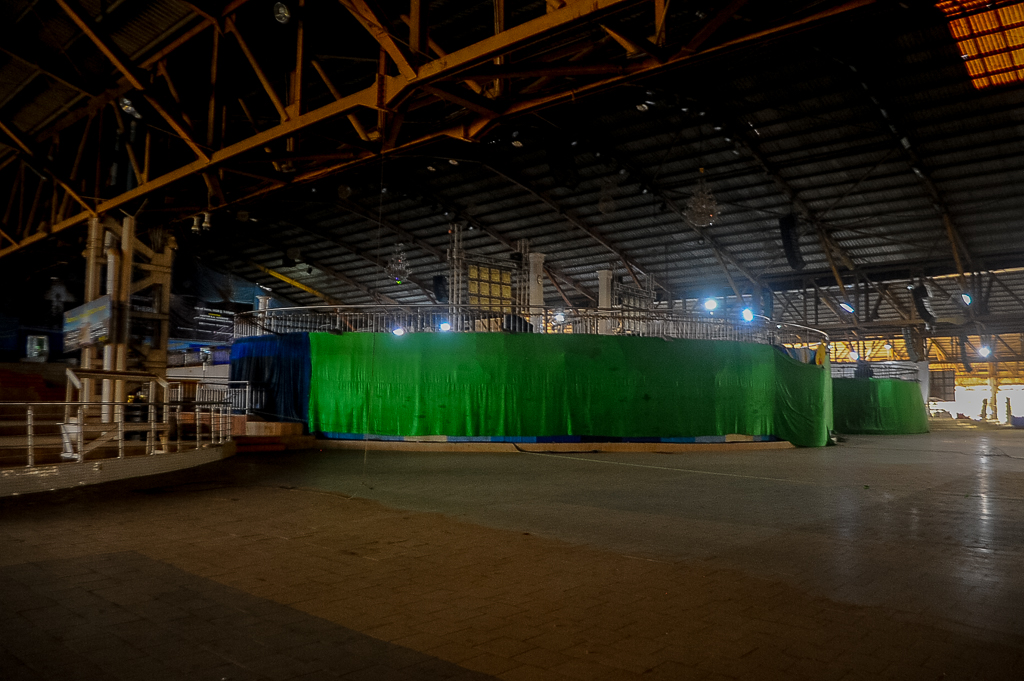

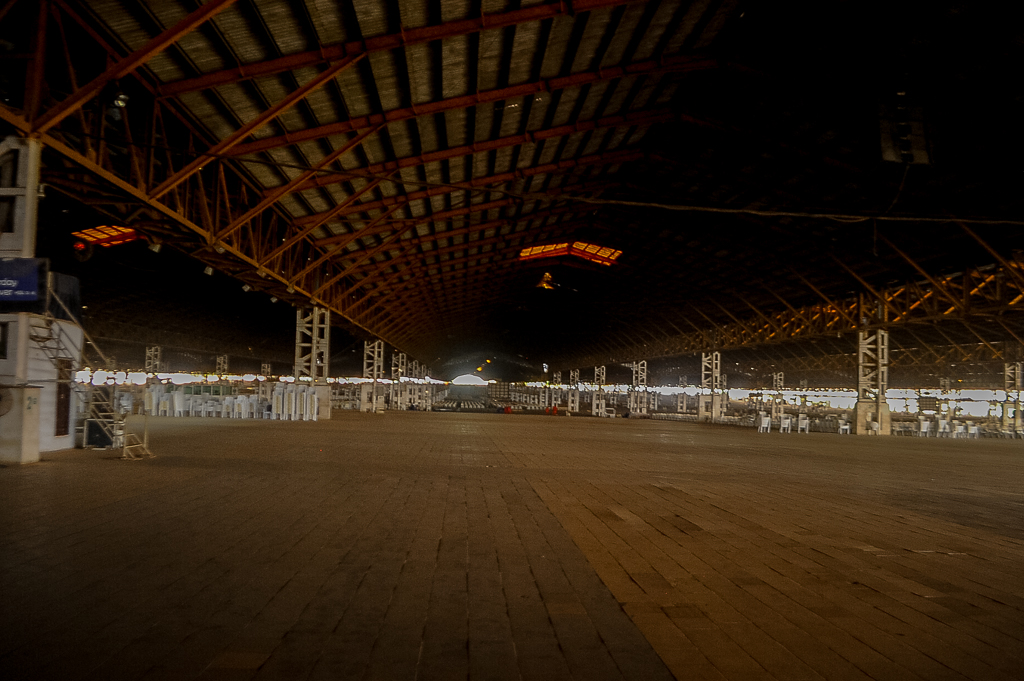

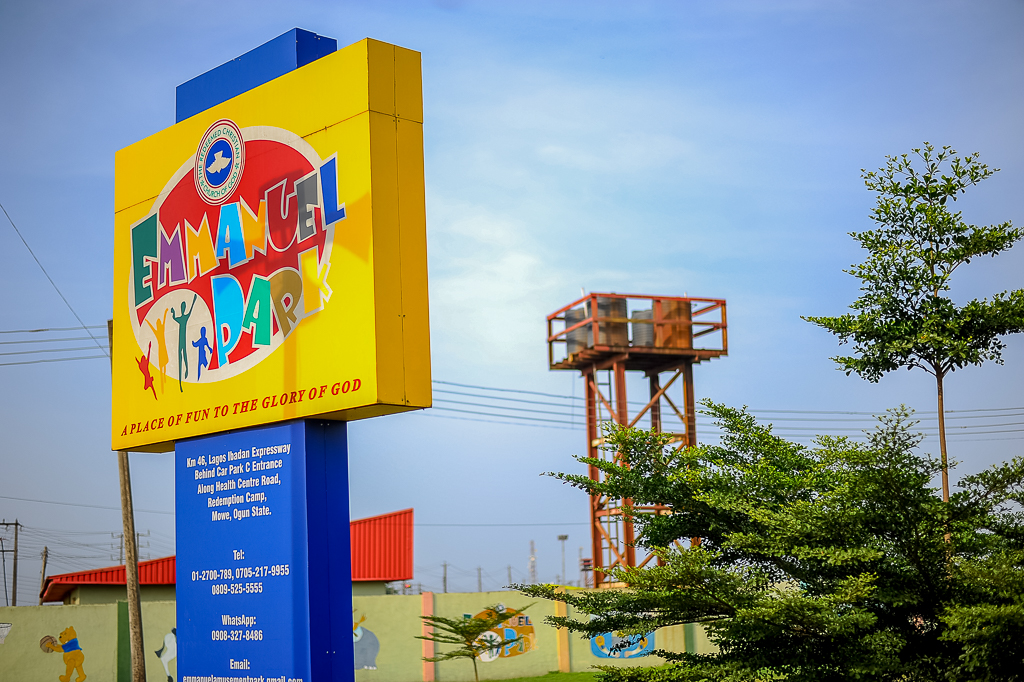

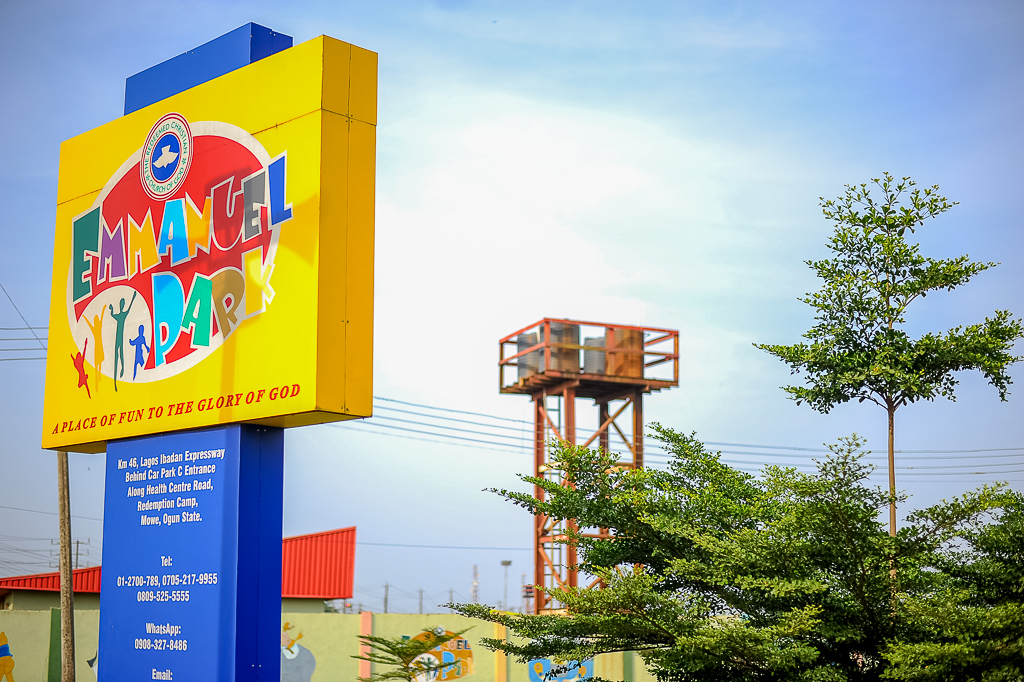

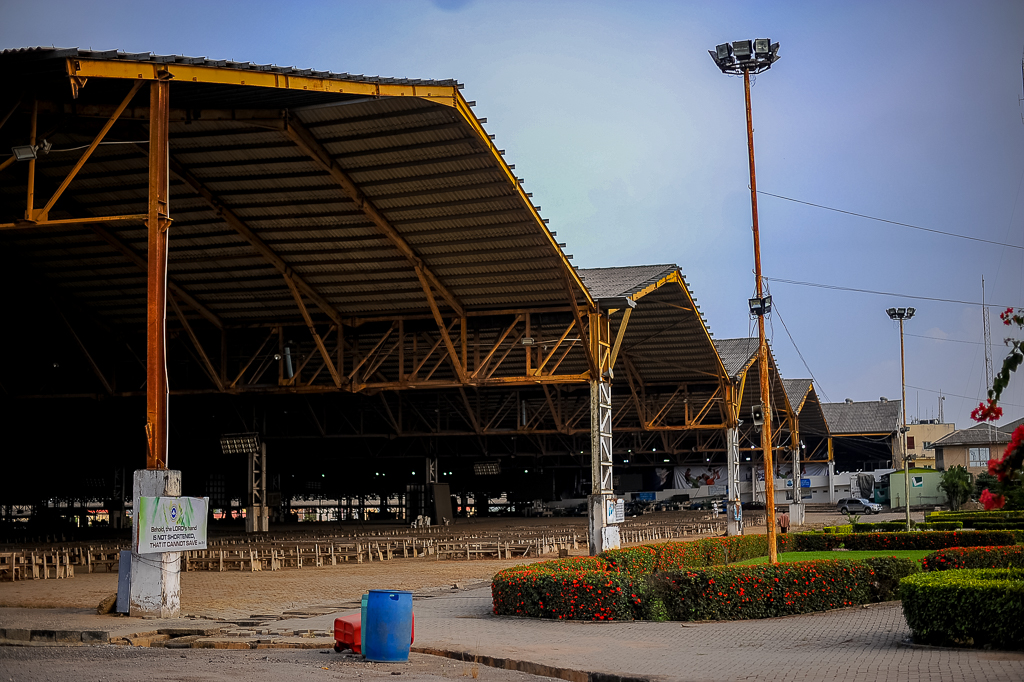

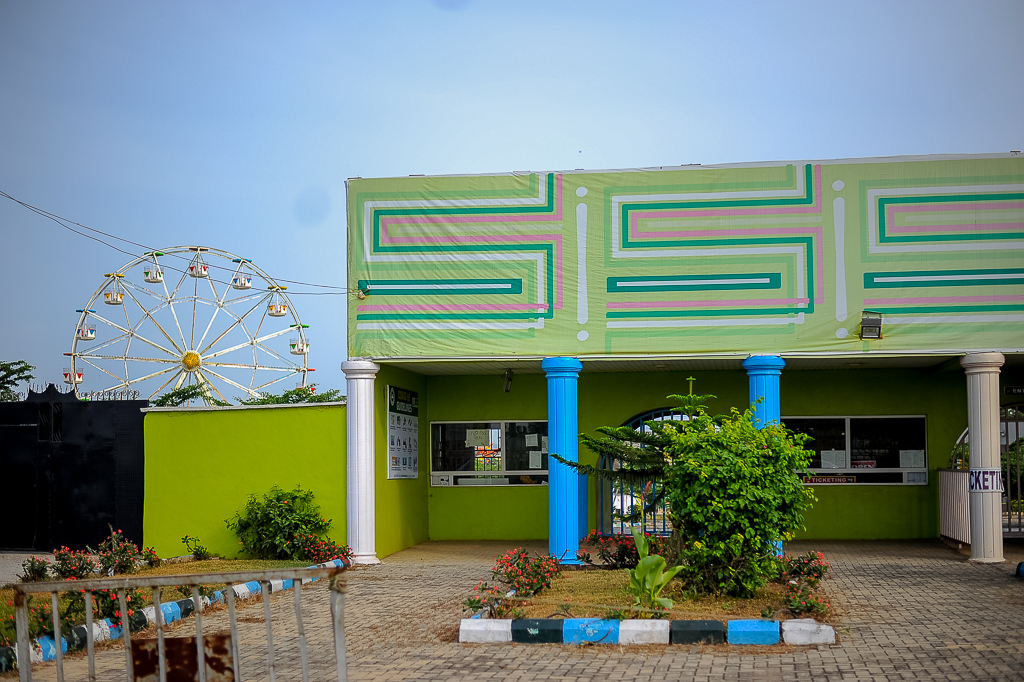

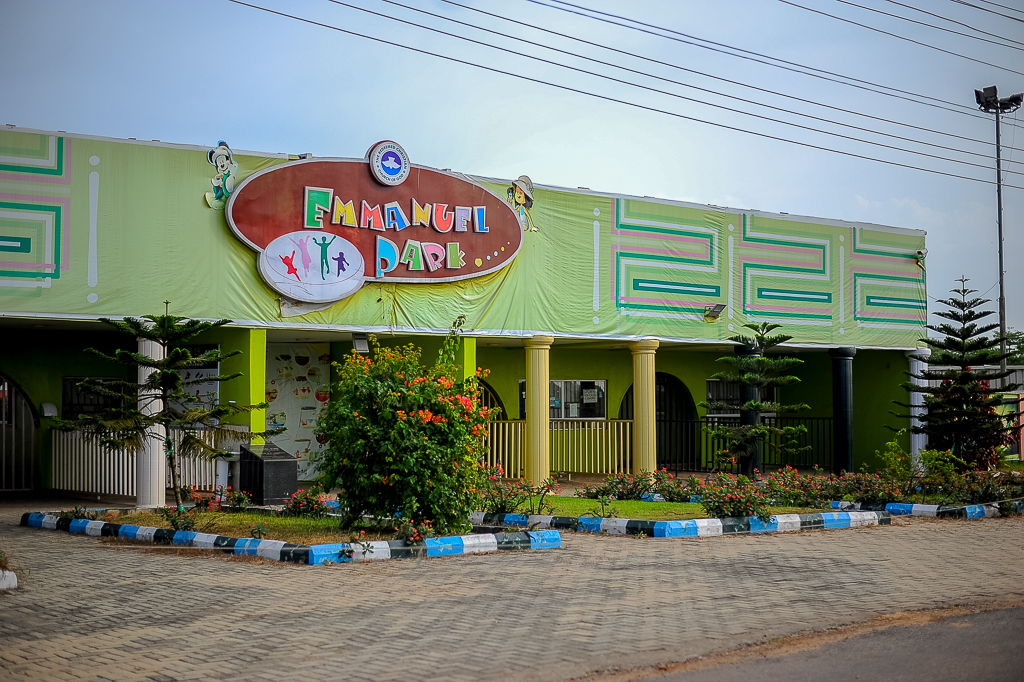

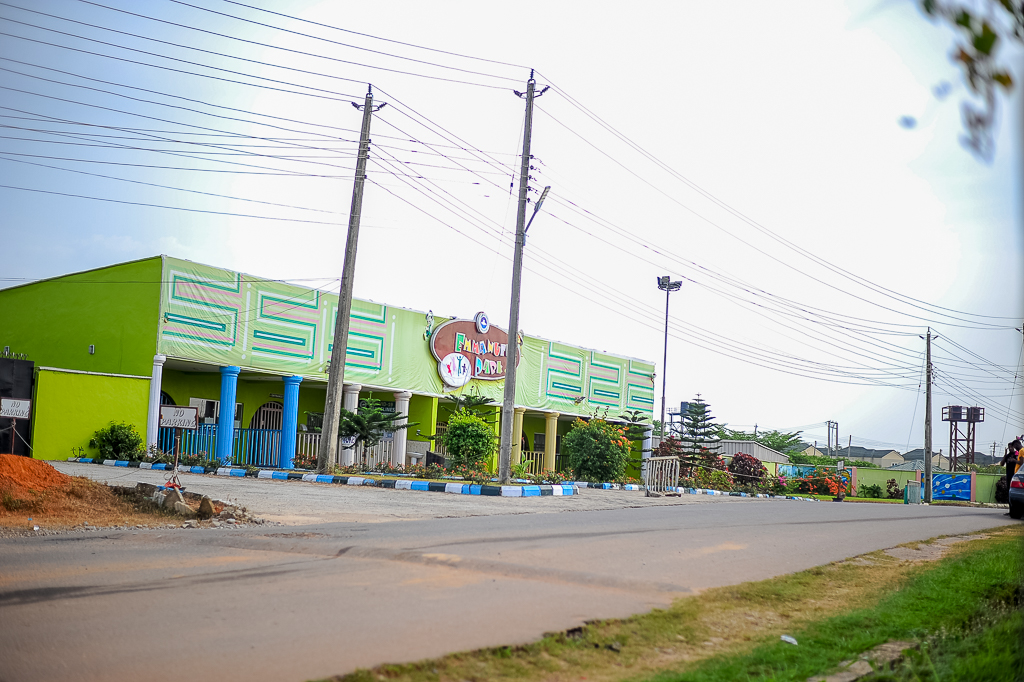

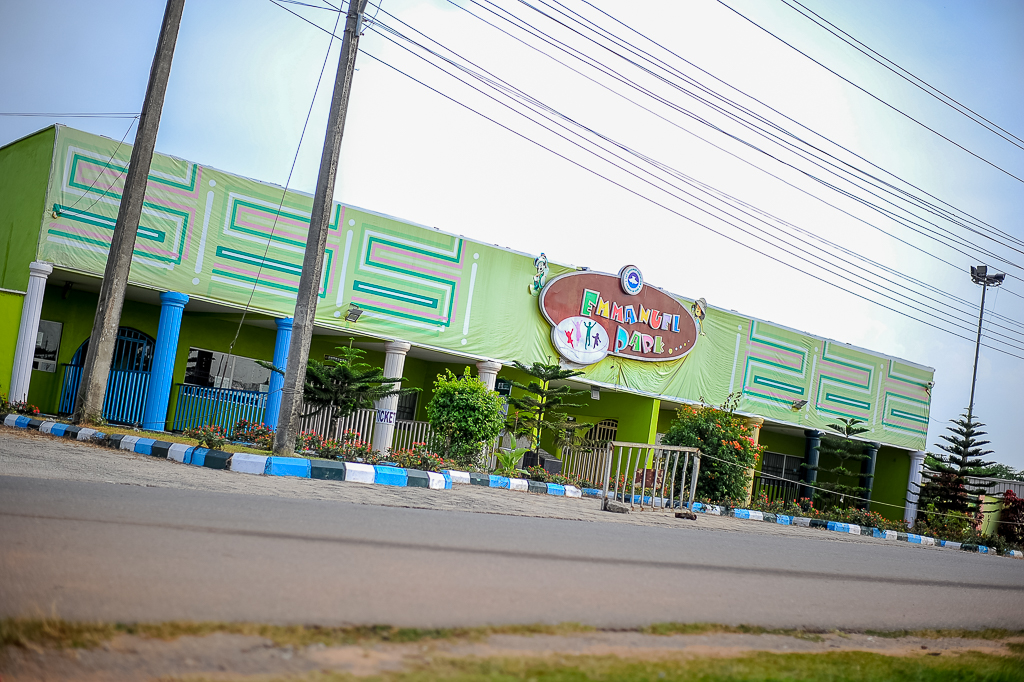

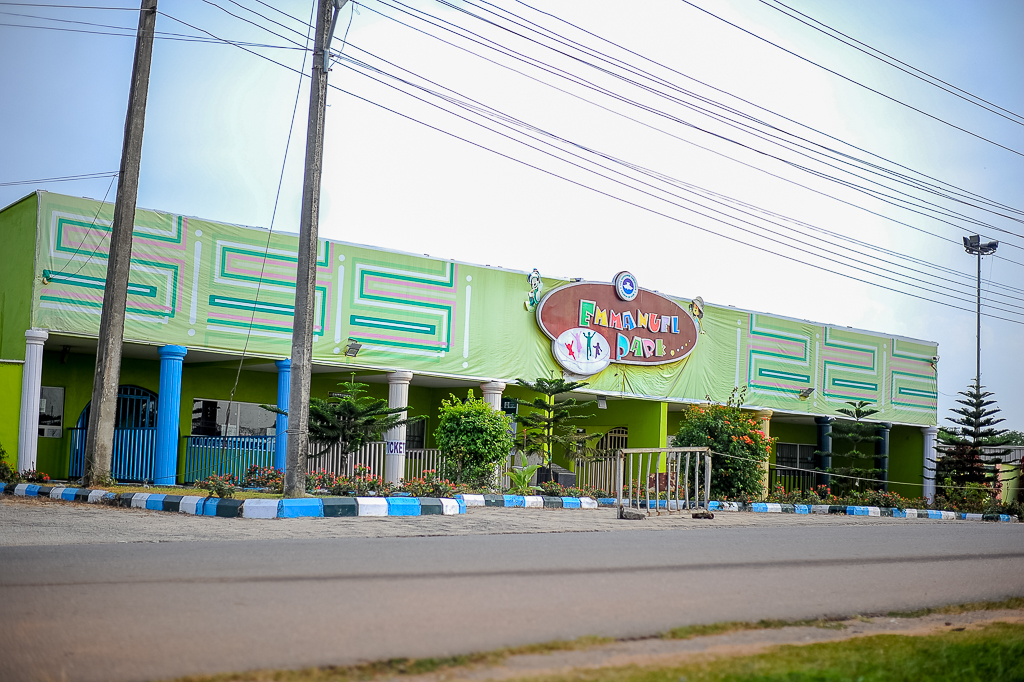
