= China Communications Construction Company =

Chinese state-owned construction company

China Communications Construction

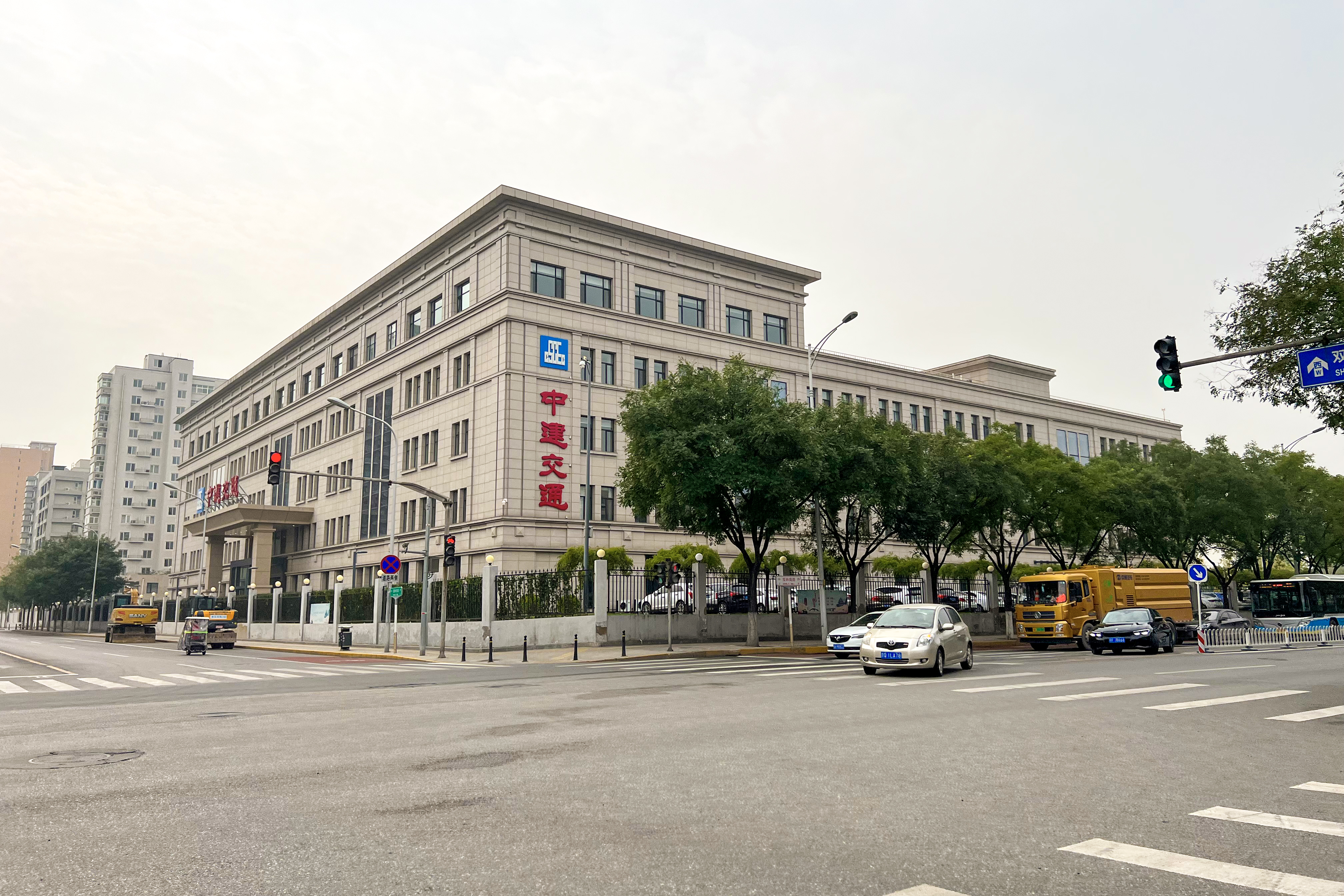
- Native name: 中国交通建设 (Chinese)
- Company type: Public; state-owned enterprise
- Traded as: SSE: 601800; SEHK: 1800
- Industry: Engineering and Construction
- Founded: 2005; 21 years ago
- Headquarters: 85 De Sheng Men Wai Street, Xicheng District, Beijing, China
- Area served: Worldwide
- Key people: Liu Qitao (chairman); Song HaiLiang (president); Peng Bihong (CFO)
- Revenue: US$ 136.7 billion (2023)
- Net income: US$ 1.6 billion (2023)
- Total assets: US$ 361.4 billion (2023)
- Owner: Government of China (63.8%)
- Number of employees: 219,034 (2023)
- Subsidiaries: China Road and Bridge Corporation; China Harbour Engineering Company; John Holland Group

Chinese name
- Simplified Chinese: 中国交通建设股份有限公司
- Traditional Chinese: 中國交通建設股份有限公司
Transcriptions
Standard Mandarin
- Hanyu Pinyin: Zhōngguó Jiāotōng Jiànshè Gǔfèn Yǒuxiàn Gōngsī

China Communications Construction
- Simplified Chinese: 中国交通建设
- Traditional Chinese: 中國交通建設
Transcriptions
Standard Mandarin
- Hanyu Pinyin: Zhōngguó Jiāotōng Jiànshè

CCCC
- Simplified Chinese: 中交建
- Traditional Chinese: 中交建
Transcriptions
Standard Mandarin
- Hanyu Pinyin: Zhōngjiāojiàn
- Website: en.ccccltd.cn

China Communications Construction Company, Ltd. (CCCC) is a Chinese majority state-owned, publicly traded, multinational engineering and construction company primarily engaged in the design, construction, and operation of infrastructure assets, including highways, skyways, bridges, tunnels, railways (especially high-speed rail), subways, airports, oil platforms, and marine ports. CCCC has been a contractor for numerous Belt and Road Initiative projects. It is included in the Fortune Global 500 list for 2016.

== History ==
CCCC's predecessors can be traced back to the Qing Dynasty, when the Junpu Engineering Bureau was established in 1905. The company was officially formed in 2005 by the merger of China Road and Bridge Corporation (CRBC) and China Harbour Engineering Company (CHEC), which focus on transportation infrastructure and marine infrastructure, respectively. In 2006, the company listed shares on the Hong Kong Stock Exchange, followed by a listing on the Shanghai Stock Exchange in 2012.

=== Misconduct ===
Since the mid-2000s, CCCC has been implicated in misconduct including fraud and corruption in Bangladesh, Equatorial Guinea, Malaysia, and the Philippines. Penalties included debarment by the World Bank and the Bangladesh government.

==== Bangladesh ====
In early 2018, CCCC subsidiary, China Harbour Engineering Company, was debarred for attempted bribery of a senior government official in relation to a contract for the expansion of the Dhaka-Sylhet Highway. Finance Minister AMA Muhith said: "[The expansion of] Dhaka-Sylhet Highway, somehow, we had to drop it. Because, the party who got the contract, they came up, in the very beginning, with offer of bribe, open bribe.

So, we gave the money, which they gave to some of our officials, back to the Chinese embassy and naturally blacklisted the company."

==== Equatorial Guinea ====
An investigation by the U.S. Department of Justice alleged that, in 2009, CCCC paid US$19 million to Teodorin Obiang, Vice President of Equatorial Guinea, in relation to a contract for a highway. Teodorin Obiang settled the case, agreeing to forfeit over US$30 million worth of U.S. assets.

The DOJ case was settled, but CCCC has continued to face scrutiny in other African nations for governance issues.

==== Malaysia ====
CCCC has been implicated in schemes devised by ex-Prime Minister Najib Razak and advisor Low Taek Jho to bail out debts related to 1MDB. The Malaysian government agreed with CCCC to construct an East Coast Railway line for RM60 billion. Government documents revealed that the contract required CCCC to buy shares of companies related to Low, specifically, 70 percent of Putrajaya Perdana Bhd for US$244 million (RM957 million) and 90 percent of Loh & Loh for US$71 million (RM283 million). However, these allegations were denied by Malaysia Rail Link Sdn Bhd, the owner of the railway project.

Yet, in September 2019, during Najib's trial for corruption in relation to 1MDB, his previous assistant, Amhari Effendi Nazaruddin, testified that he traveled to Beijing China in June 2016 to discuss proposals for infrastructure projects that would help to pay off the debts of 1MDB and its former unit, SRC International. The briefing points for the Beijing meeting stressed that "while simultaneously completely resolving 1MDB and SRC debts". Amhari testified to his unease about the Beijing mission, "I was worried about being involved directly in Najib and Low Taek Jho's plan to cover up the loss of 1MDB funds and the repayment of International Petroleum Investment Co (IPIC) debts or the preparation of political funds".

In March 2023, a court in Kuwait convicted Jho Low and others of money laundering. Trial documents revealed the flow of funds from CCCC through two Hong Kong subsidiaries, Multi Strategic Investment Limited and True Dragon Properties Limited, to Kuwait entities. The funds were proceeds of loans by the Export-Import Bank of China to finance the East Coast Railway.

==== Philippines ====
In 2009, the World Bank Group debarred CCCC and CRBC until 2017 for fraudulent practices under Phase 1 of the Philippines National Roads Improvement and Management Project. Together with five other companies, CCCC and CRBC had colluded to enter non-competitive, artificially high bid prices.

==== Russia ====
The company has participated in significant ventures aimed at revitalizing Russia's shipbuilding and port infrastructure, including projects that enhance Russia's Northern Sea Route.

=== U.S. sanctions ===
In August 2020, the United States Department of Commerce placed several CCCC subsidiaries on the Bureau of Industry and Security's Entity List for their construction work to militarize artificial islands in the South China Sea. The same month, the United States Department of Defense released the names of additional "Communist Chinese military companies" operating directly or indirectly in the United States. CCCC was included on the list. In November 2020, Donald Trump issued an executive order prohibiting any American company or individuals from owning shares in companies, including CCCC, that the U.S. Department of Defense has listed as having links to the People's Liberation Army. In December 2020, the United States Department of Commerce added CCCC itself to the Entity List.

== Corporate affairs ==
=== Ownership ===
CCCC is a "blue chip" stock (part of the CSI 300 Index). As of 2016, the State-owned Assets Supervision and Administration Commission of the State Council (SASAC) holds 63.8% of the company's shares. Other shareholders include multiple affiliates of (or funds managed by) Merrill Lynch, BlackRock and JPMorgan Chase.

=== Operations ===
The company operates through various subsidiaries, including CRBD and CHED, John Holland Group, an Australia-based construction company focused on infrastructure, Friede & Goldman, headquartered in Houston, which engineers offshore vessels for the oil and gas industry, and Concremat Engenharia e Tecnologia S.A., an engineering and infrastructure consultancy based in Brasil.

CCCC is a major contractor in the Belt and Road Initiative. CCCC is involved in dredging projects in disputed areas in the South China Sea, highway-building in Xinjiang, and building naval logistics installations at Gwadar Port.

CCCC's subsidiary China Harbour Engineering Company is the leading infrastructure developer in Sri Lanka and is the principal contractor for the development of Hambantota International Port. CCCC itself began a major project in Sri Lanka, Port City Colombo.

== See also ==
- Infrastructure-Based Development
- Asian Infrastructure Investment Bank
