= China Harbour Engineering Company =

Strategic state-owned enterprise

China Harbour Engineering Co Ltd
- Native name: 中国港湾工程有限责任公司 (Chinese)
- Company type: Subsidiary
- Industry: Civil engineering
- Founded: 2005; 21 years ago
- Headquarters: Beijing, China
- Parent: China Communications Construction Company

Chinese name
- Simplified Chinese: 中国港湾工程有限责任公司
- Traditional Chinese: 中國港灣工程有限責任公司
Transcriptions
Standard Mandarin
- Hanyu Pinyin: Zhōngguó Gǎngwān Gōngchéng Yǒuxiàn Zérèn Gōngsī
- Website: www.chec.bj.cn

China Harbour Engineering Company Ltd (CHEC) is an engineering contractor and a subsidiary of state-owned China Communications Construction Company (CCCC), providing infrastructure construction, such as marine engineering, dredging and reclamation, road and bridge, railways, airports and plant construction. It is the second largest dredging company in the world, carrying out projects in Asia, Africa, and Europe.

== History ==
The company was established in December 2005 during the merger of China Harbour Engineering Company Group (founded 1980) with China Road and Bridge Corporation into CCCC.

In 2018, Sri Lankan State Minister of Finance and Mass Media Eran Wickramaratne called for an investigation into CHEC following reports that it had funded the campaign of Mahinda Rajapaksa during the 2015 Sri Lankan presidential election. CHEC denied funding the election campaign.

The company was debarred by the World Bank for bribery in Bangladesh.

== Projects ==
CHEC has won large contracts for dredging, particularly in the Middle East and Asia. In January 2011, the company was awarded a US$880 million contract for the first phase of the New Doha port project, which involved the excavation of 58 million cubic metres of material (covering an area of 3.2 square kilometres to a depth of 18 metres) and the building of an 8-kilometre-long quay wall and a 5 km rubble breakwater.

=== Sri Lanka ===
China Harbour began working on projects in Sri Lanka in the late 1990s, initially as a subcontractor for other companies. When the Sri Lankan government in 2007 sought loans from China to develop Hambantota International Port, China Harbour lobbied to hired for the project. During the negotiations for loans, the Chinese government recommended China Harbour, Sri Lanka and the lender Export-Import Bank of China accepted, and China Harbour became the main contractor for the project.

China Harbour's business in Sri Lanka grew rapidly from 2008 to 2010. After the completion of Phase I of the Hambantota Port project, China Harbour became a leading infrastructure contractor in Sri Lanka.

=== Costa Rica ===
- Widening from two lanes, one in each direction, to four lanes, two in each direction on Route 32 between Guápiles and Puerto Limón. Project started in 2018, estimated delivery on 2020.

=== Colombia ===
The Bogota Metro announced on October 17, 2019, that Apca Transmimetro, comprising CHEC and Xi'an Metro Company, has been chosen for a $US 5.16bn contract to design, build, operate and maintain Line 1 of the Bogota metro.

== See also ==
- Belt and Road Initiative
- Foreign policy of China
