= Okokomaiko =

District of Ojo, Nigeria

- Town
- Location within Nigeria
- Coordinates: 6°28′30″N 3°11′26″E
- Country: Nigeria
- State: Lagos State
- LGA: Ojo
- Time zone: UTC+1 (WAT)

Okokomaiko is an area in the town of Ojo, located in Lagos State, southwest Nigeria, along the Lagos- Badagry Expressway. The Lagos State government, under the leadership of the former governor Akinwunmi Ambode stretched the importance of this route in the West African sub-region and had plans to expand the Lagos-Badagry Expressway to a 10-lane highway. This construction began from Eric Moore to Okokomaiko. Ambode, during his tenure as the governor, welcomed any investor who is willing to partner with the state government in the construction of the mile-2 to Badagry road project, which includes the Okokomaiko area. He said “At the moment, work is already ongoing from Eric More to Okokomaiko but we are willing to partner with any investor interested in taking up the construction of the second phase which is ten-lane road from Okokomaiko to Seme Border".

== Notable people ==
- Brymo

== See also ==
- Awori District settlements
