= Mowe, Nigeria =

Mowe
- Town
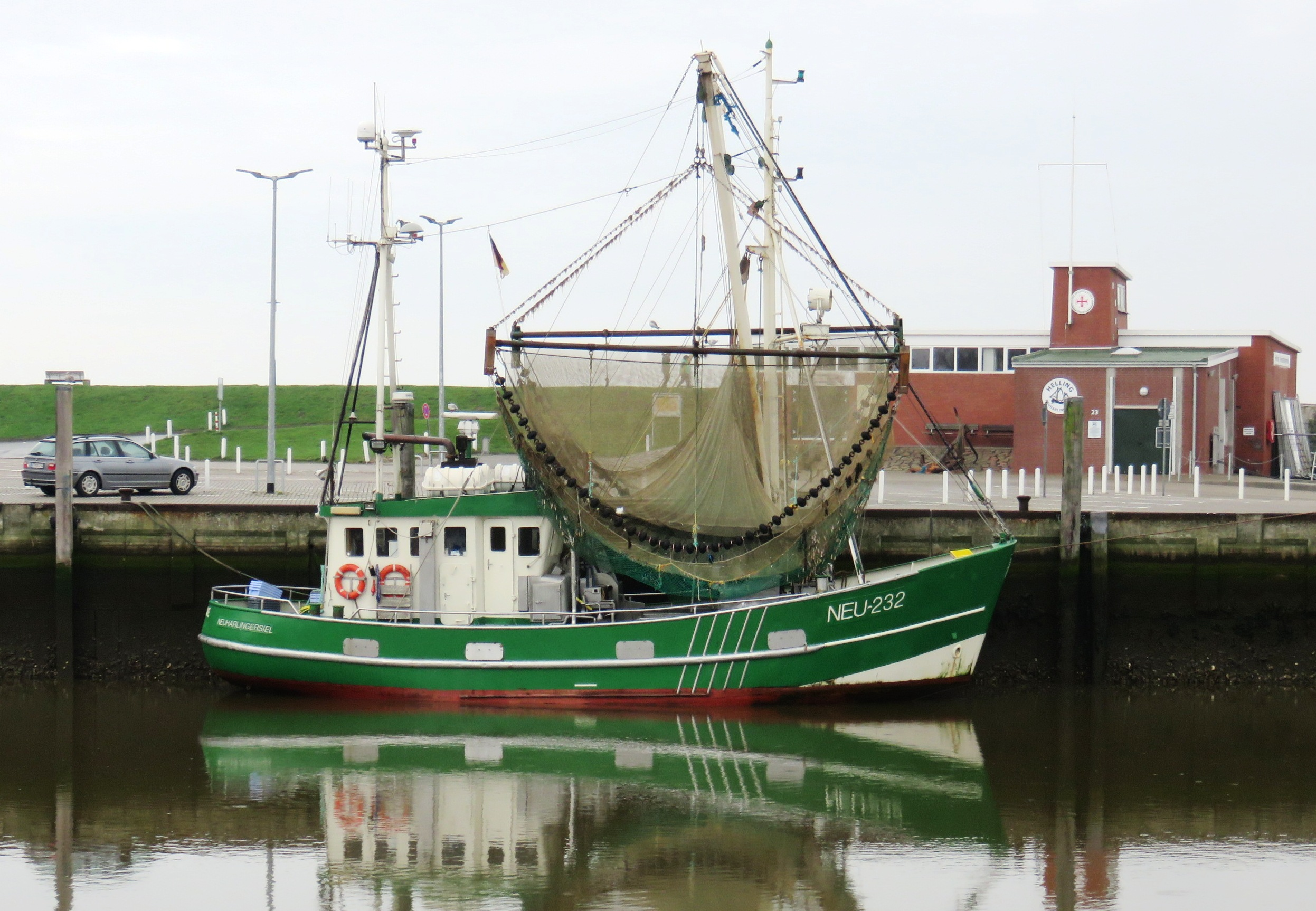
- Nickname: Ilu idera
- Location in Nigeria
- Coordinates: 6.811°N 3.437°E
- Country: Nigeria
- State: Ogun State
- LGA: Obafemi Owode

Government
  - Type: Traditional authority
  - Body: Council of Chiefs
  - His Royal Majesty: Oba Festus Oluwole Makinde (Olu of Igbein land)
- Time zone: UTC+1 (WAT)
- 3-digit postal code prefix: 121
- ISO 3166 code: NG.OG.IP

Mowe is a town in Obafemi Owode Local Government Area of Ogun State, Nigeria. The town is located along the Lagos-Ibadan Expressway. It is 512 kilometres (318 miles) southwest of Abuja, Nigeria's capital city, and 29 km (18 mi) from Lagos.
