= Lagos Metropolitan Area Transport Authority =

State agency governing transport

Agency overview
- Website: www.lamata-ng.com

Footnotes
- Keeping Lagos Moving

The Lagos Metropolitan Area Transport Authority (LAMATA) is the Lagos State Government agency created to coordinate transport planning, policies, and public transport infrastructure implementation in the Lagos Metropolitan Area, Nigeria. The organisation oversees wide range of transport planning and implementation of transport strategies and plans in Lagos, as well as the Lagos Rail Mass Transit and the Lagos Bus Rapid Transit System. It is based in Ikeja.

The bill setting up the Lagos Metropolitan Area Transport Authority (LAMATA) was signed into law on 13 January 2002 by the then Governor of Lagos State, Asiwaju Bola Ahmed Tinubu (1999 – 2007). The law empowered LAMATA with the responsibility of reforming the transport system in Lagos.

== Background ==
The United Nations defined Lagos as the only mega city yet to have an organized public transportation. The population is highly mobile and largely reliant upon public transport however the lack of formally organized public transport has led to gross inefficiencies in its provision and a low level of service to those forced to use it. Public transport in Lagos has been widely described as chaotic, inefficient, expensive, low quality and dangerous both in terms of road traffic accidents and personal safety.

== Transformation of the Informal Sector ==
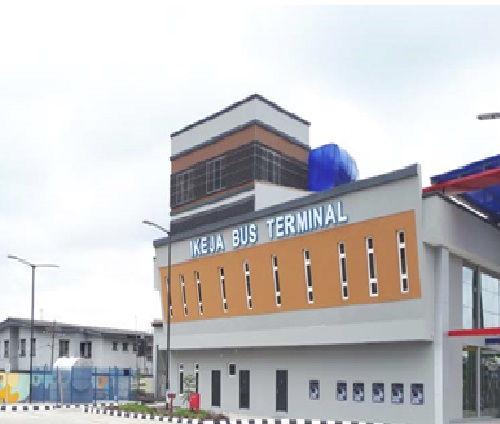
New Ikeja Terminal constructed by LAMATA

The performance of the Bus services has been influenced by the inability of the government authority to effectively franchise all the Bus Routes in Lagos. It is obvious that each bus routes has a peculiar operational characteristics considering the social, economic and environmental variables that will guide their operations. As a result, the continuous franchising of all the Bus Routes in Lagos is expedient. To expedite the process of Bus franchising and effective route coordination, LAMATA has produced Lagos State Strategic Transport Master Plan (LSSTMP) and Bus Route Network (BRN) document to guide in the phased franchising of all the bus routes. The LSSTMP identified fourteen BRT routes while the Bus Route Network Study identified 485 individual bus routes, consisting of mass transit, standard and feeders’ routes. The process geared towards the franchising of these routes is ongoing.

The concept adopted for the franchise system currently running in Lagos under LAMATA regulated bus scheme is the Public Private Partnership (PPP) model. In this model, the service routes are franchised to a Private Operator whereby Government provides the infrastructure i.e. bus depot/garage, terminals, shelters and TSM measures, construction and rehabilitation of roads. The private sector procures the buses, is responsible for operation and maintenance of the buses, recruitment of personnel and revenue collection among others. The contract option that is currently being used for the current contract i.e. Ikorodu – TBS and the bus franchise scheme on Maryland – IyanaIpaja – Ikotun – Igando bus services, is the net cost management contract. The Contract option allows LAMATA to specify the routes, design service specifications, set standard of operations and fares whilst the operator recruit, train crew and manage operations. The operator also enters into a franchise agreement with the State Government to maintain the buses, adhere to the set standards and paid the agreed franchise fees to the government. LAMATA’s adoption of the net cost management contract was guided by the objective of the Lagos State Government, level of private sector confidence in LAMATA schemes that are publicly driven, and government investment policy and programs etc.

As part of the activities towards the transformation of the informal sector in Lagos Metropolitan Area, LAMATA has commenced with the franchising of bus routes for the BRT and Bus Franchise Scheme, amongst them is the BRT scheme along Ikorodu – TBS and the Bus Franchise Scheme along Ikotun/Igando-IyanaIpaja –Maryland Corridor. BRT System

The introduction of the BRT system to the Lagos Metropolitan roads owes its present state to decades of concerted efforts and initiatives in Bus planning and restructuring, adaptation and Government intervention. The BRT Scheme demonstrated a unique public transport progression which started from bus operations of unfettered market to one with planned approach with restricted players and the transition to government contracting model.

The need for a bus reform in Lagos became obvious in the face of alarming rate of disorganized services and lack of structure in the Public Transport sector thus creating need for total restructuring of the sector. Consequently, the 1st Phase of Lagos BRT Scheme was launched on March 17, 2008, on Ikorodu Road from Mile 12 – TBS. The operations was franchised to the 1st BRT Cooperatives, an arm of the National Union of Road Transport Workers, Lagos Chapter. The system commenced operations with 220 buses that runs from 6.00 a.m. to 10 p.m. daily and transported more than 200,000 passengers daily. The system in the first 4 years of operation had moved more than 220 million passengers.

The Scheme gained acceptance from all commuting public and Lagosians. The system paid the initial loan for the first 100 buses within 18 months against the 36 month’s period that was agreed with the funding bank. Over 2000 direct and indirect jobs were also created. However, after successful bus loan repayment and operations success, the operation began to dwindle as a result of operations and management challenges. After a prolonged state of the Union inability to meet up with the set operations standard, the franchise was terminated in September 2015. Owing to the successful deployment of the 1st Phase from Mile 12 – TBS, an extension to Ikorodu Roundabout from Mile 12 was approved and completed. The BRT lane was hence extended to Ikorodu roundabout from Mile 12 and a new operator, Primero Transport Services Limited (PTSL), a private sector operator was brought on board in November 2015 to anchor the BRT operations from Ikorodu roundabout to TBS. PTSL has injected 434 buses to service the operations from Ikorodu to TBS and has conveyed over 33 million passengers from November 2015 to date.

From inception till date, the BRT scheme has conveyed over 380 million passengers, reduced the waiting time of passengers to about 10 minutes and has consequently reduced the volume of emission on the BRT corridor.

The system is however being gradually upgraded to the BRT Classic System with the introduction of Electronic Ticketing and Intelligent Transport System. The BRT currently has 45 bus shelters, 5 terminals and 2 bus depots which house a maintenance bay, a fuel dump, an automatic washing bay, administrative offices and other appurtenances for the smooth operation of the system. The operation is guided by a set of regulations approved by the Lagos State House of Assembly and signed into law in 2007. The regulations restrict all other road users from using the BRT lane.

Finally, the BRT scheme has created the opportunities for bus reform and regulations of the scheme.

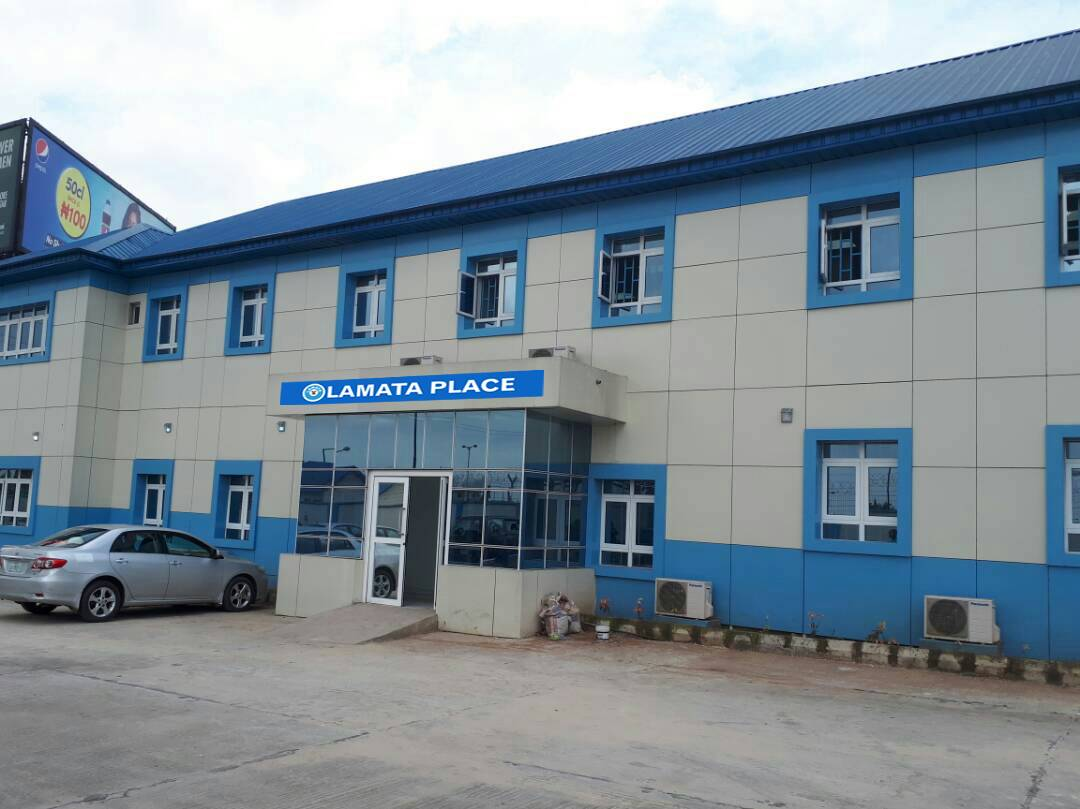
LAMATA Place, LAMATA's headquarters in Ketu.

== Lagos Rail Mass Transit ==
The Lagos Rail Mass Transit (LRMT) network is a major component of the Strategic Transport Master Plan (STMP) which has been developed to guide as a compass for the development of public transport infrastructures in the State. The STMP is a 30-year plan put together under series of intensive researches, studies and analyses of future transportation demands and needs of Lagos State as Nigeria’s commercial and economic hub and one of the world’s fastest growing mega cities.

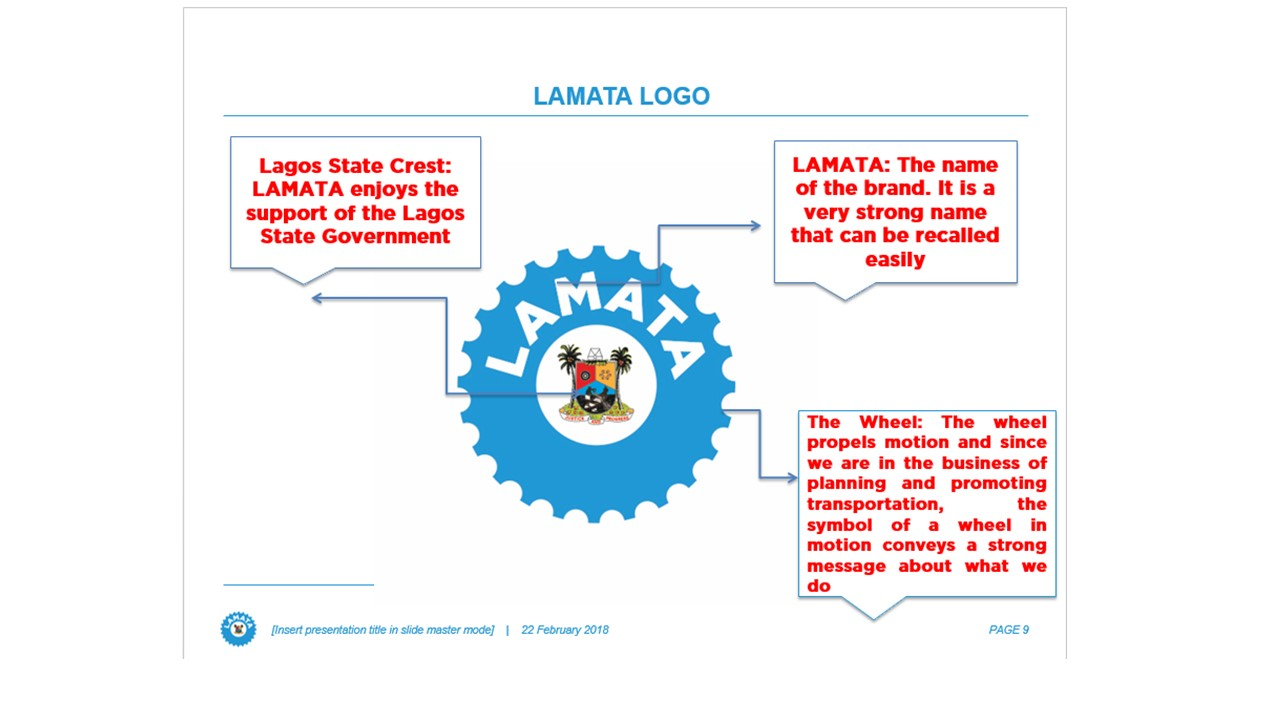
Interpretation of the LAMATA Brand identity

== Component of LURN ==
The Lagos Urban Rail Network (LURN) is a network of urban rail-based systems covering six major corridors of high commuter traffic demand within and beyond the metropolitan Lagos extending to border areas with Ogun States and a circular monorail to orbit Ikoyi, Victoria Island and Lekki.

The seven lines link the major population and activity centers in the state, as well as taking advantage, where possible, of existing transport corridors. The network is fully integrated with planned and existing water transport and BRT routes.

Red Line The Red Line is a 37 km North – South rail route proposed to run from Agbado to Marina with twelve proposed stations at Agbado, Iju, Agege, Ikeja, Shogunle, Oshodi, Mushin, Yaba, Ebute Metta (EBJ), Iddo, Ebute Ero and Marina with connection to the airport (MMIA International, MMIA Domestic). A recent development has resulted in the Red Line project sharing Nigeria Railway Corporation’s (NRC) rail track from Agbado to EBJ and then proceeded across the Lagoon to Marina via Iddo, with the Marina Station sharing the hub with the Blue line station and integrated with other transport modes. The proposed gauge for the Red Line is the International Standard Gauge (1435 mm). The Line is expected to carry 750,000 passengers per day at inception and 1.1m when fully operational.

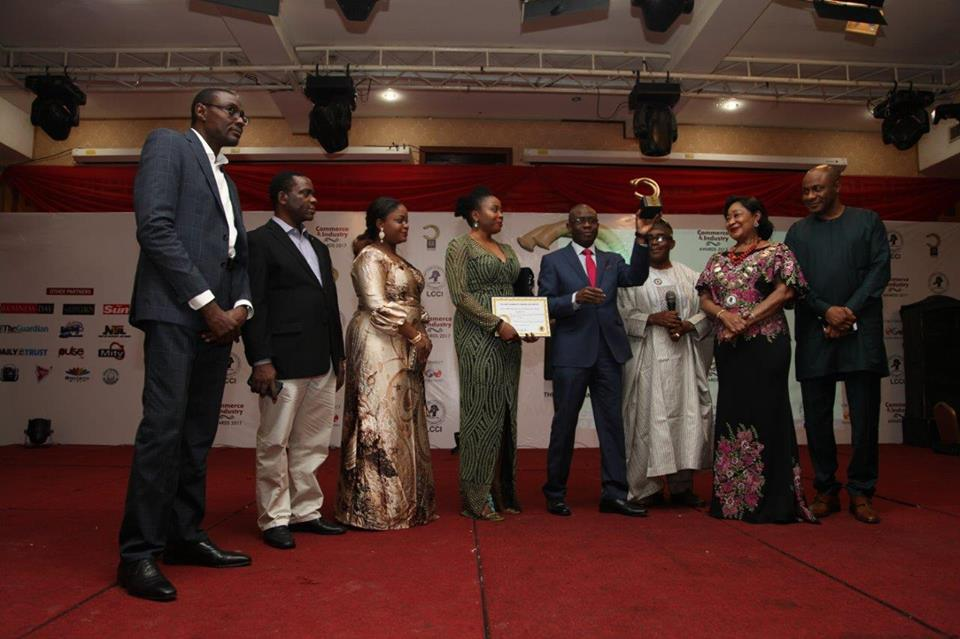
LAMATA receives the Infrastructure of the year award 2017

== The Cable Car Initiative ==
Mass Rapid Transit (MRT) can only directly serve part of the metropolitan area and in the short/medium term the MRT network will be relatively undeveloped. Hence, the development of MRT will need to be supported by complementary quality public transport networks, integrated with MRT. The Lagos Cable Car Project is designed to deliver such a system.

The most promising corridor for cable car development to complement the Strategic Transport Master Plan (STMP) is the corridor linking Apapa with Lagos Island, Obalende/Ikoyi and Victoria Island, which is not directly served by the STMP mass transit networks. Here the cable car project would provide transport connections with the RMRT and BRT lines. The project will attract private sector funding thus increasing the level of investment available for improving transportation in Lagos.

== Partners ==
- World Bank
- French Development Agency
- Lagos State Government

== See also ==
- Transportation in Lagos
- Lagos Bus Rapid Transit System
- Lagos Rail Mass Transit
- Lagos State Traffic Management Authority
