= List of hospitals in Lagos =

Hospitals in Lagos, Nigeria

This is a list of hospitals and medical facilities in the city of Lagos, Nigeria.

Avon Medical Practice	Surulere	Milagrosa Hospital Lagos, First Cardiology Consultants (FCC Healthcare)	Ikoyi, Lagos
Etta Atlantic Memorial Hospital	Ikate Lekki, Lagos		
Chygor-Cole Specialist Hospitals (CCSH)	Abule-egba, Lagos		
Lagos Island Maternity Hospital	Lagos Island		
Lagos University Teaching Hospital (LUTH)	Idi-Araba		
Vedic Lifecare Hospital	Lekki Phase 1		
Isalu Hospitals	Ikeja		
St. Nicholas Hospital, Lagos	Lagos Island		
Wind of Grace Hospital	Okota		
Federal Medical Centre Ebute Metta	Ebute Metta		
First Consultant Hospital	Obalende		
Creek Hospital	Onikan, Lagos Island		
Lagos State University Teaching Hospital (LASUTH)	Ikeja		
National Orthopaedic Hospital	Lagos		
Lagoon Hospitals	Lagos		
Duchess International Hospital	Ikeja		
Mercy Stripes Specialist Hospital	Shasha		
Eko Hospital	Ikeja		
Reddington Hospital	Victoria Island		
Lagos Island General Hospital	Odan		
Yaba Psychiatric Hospital	Yaba		
Gbagada General Hospital	Lagos		
Holy Trinity Hospital	Ikeja		
Adefemi Hospital	Ikeja		
Blue Cross Hospital	Ogba		
Ifako-Ijaiye General Hospital	Ifako-Ijaiye		
Isolo General Hospital	Oshodi-Isolo		
Ikorodu General Hospital	Ikorodu		
Badagry General Hospital	Badagry		
Maryiam Ville Medical Center	Surulere		
St. Joseph's Physiotherapy Clinic	Lekki		
Adebayo Living Tower Hospital	Badagry		
Shepherd Medical Centre	Opebi		
Ave Maria Hospital	Lekki		
Randle General Hospital	Surulere		
Arubah Family Medical Centre	Lekki		
Krown Hospital	Alimosho		
Paelon Memorial Hospital	Victoria Island		
Massey Street Children's Hospital	Lagos Island		
Mascot Healthcare Clinic	Akoka		
Outreach Women and Children Hospital	Lekki | Festac | Okota		
St Nycholas Hospital	Victoria Island		
Euracare Hospitals	Victoria Island		
Evercare Hospital	Lekki		

Havana specialist hospital, surulere
