= Lagoon Hospitals =

Nigerian healthcare company

- Hygeia Group

Geography
- Location: Lagos, Lagos State, Nigeria

Organisation
- Care system: Private
- Type: General; Surgery; Teaching
- Network: Hygeia Group

Services
- Emergency department: Yes

History
- Founded: 1986

Links
- Website: http://www.hygeiagroup.com
- Other links: List of hospitals in Lagos

Lagoon Hospitals, is one of the largest healthcare companies in Nigeria.

== Locations ==
Established in 1986 under the Hygeia Group, the healthcare company provides a range of primary and tertiary healthcare services in four locations: Lagoon Apapa, Lagoon Ikeja, Lagoon Victoria Island and Lagoon Ikoyi respectively. The Hospital in Apapa is the flagship hospital. The Group added two new locations: Lagoon Clinics in Adeniyi Jones, Ikeja and Lagoon Specialist Suites in Victoria Island making a total of six.

== Milestones ==
Lagoon Hospitals have pioneered advanced medical care in Nigeria. Lagoon hospitals became the first private hospital in the country to successfully perform an open-heart surgery. The surgery was performed by a team of resident Nigerian healthcare professionals. Lagoon hospitals in Apapa and Ikeja hospitals also became the first hospitals in sub-Saharan Africa to earn accreditation from Joint commission international (JCI), the global acclaimed and recognised agency certifying hospitals and healthcare organisations with world standards and best practice in healthcare delivery.

Lagoon Hospitals achieved another major feat with the investment in a new, complete electronic system for keeping patients' medical records aiming to integrate patient care for its hospitals and physicians’ practices. This has been implemented across the various locations. Aiming to prioritize primary healthcare services in Nigeria in order to improve access as well as ensure efficient healthcare delivery, the group inaugurated an ultramodern Primary healthcare Outpatient Complex in Apapa. The Outpatient Complex is projected to meet the growing demand for quality healthcare and strengthen the Nigerian primary healthcare system. Services in the department includes adult and children’s general out-patient services, wound dressing, Immunization clinics, laboratory services, pre-employment and other selective screening examinations.

== Controversy ==
Lagoon came under scrutiny after an allegation of demanding "payment before treatment". The staff, however, denied the allegations.
