= Ikenna =

Ikenna is a male Igbo given name meaning "the strength of the father". The "father" here could either be one's birth parent or God.

Notable people with the name include:

- Ikenna Azuike (born 1979), Nigerian lawyer and broadcaster
- Ikenna Hilary (born 1991), Nigerian footballer
- Ikenna Ihim (born 1984), Nigerian physician
- Ikenna Iroegbu (born 1995), American basketball player
- Ikenna Samuelson Iwuoha (born 1970), Nigerian businessperson
- Ikenna Nwankwo (born 1973), American basketball player
- Ikenna Obi (born 1976), Nigerian actor and producer
- Ikenna Bryan Okwara (born 1985), Nigerian actor
- Austin Ikenna Uzoremeke (born 1993), Nigerian footballer
