= Eko Hospital =

Hospital in Lagos State, Nigeria

- Establishment of EkoCorp PLC
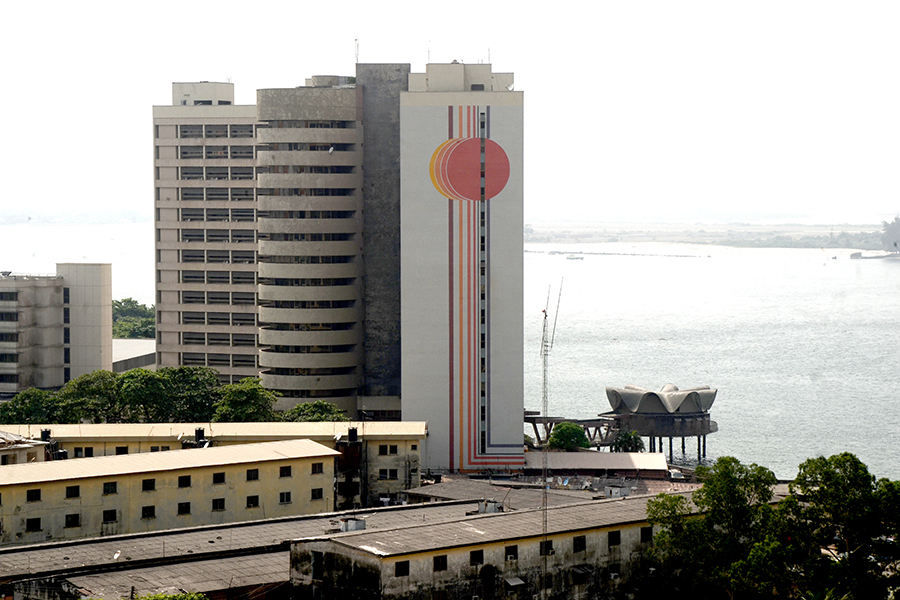

Geography
- Location: Ikeja, Lagos State, Nigeria

Organisation
- Care system: NHS
- Type: General

Services
- Emergency department: Yes

History
- Founded: 1982

Links
- Website: https://www.ekohospitals.com/
- Lists: Hospitals in Nigeria

The Eko Hospital is a private hospital located at Ikeja with annex in Ikoyi, Central Lagos, Surulere, Lagos State, Nigeria. This hospital was established in 1982 to succeed Mercy Specialist Clinic, a clinic that operated in the late 1970s to provide health care services to the entire people of Lagos State, Nigeria. Eko hospital main objective and goal is to provide a wide range of health services, including secondary services for its local population, regional as well as national health services. Eko hospital, is the first private hospital to be quoted on the floor of the Nigerian Stock Exchange.

== Facilities ==
Eko hospital has an annex at Ikeja consisting of about 130 beds space with the basic medical equipment for conducting series of diagnostic test. The Surulere annex is a 40-bed Secondary health care facility. Other diagnostic equipment includes:

- Audiometry Unit, where series of hearing test are conducted to enhance the identification of the threshold levels
- Dialysis Unit, for the diagnosis and treatment of Kidney
- Medical Laboratory, for the diagnosis of various infections and diseases
- A blood bank for the storage and preservation of donated blood for emergency purpose
- Physiotherapy Unit to provides a comprehensive service to hospital inpatients
- Radiotherapy Equipment
- Pathology Laboratory
- Psychiatric Testing
- Comprehensive Health Screening
- CT Scan Computerised Coaxial
- Angiography
- Prostate Screening
- Tomography
- Intensive Care Unit
- Fertility Centre (In Vitro Fertilisation Unit)
- Radiotherapy Equipment.

== See also ==
- Ikeja
- List of hospitals in Lagos
- Randle general hospital
