= Maroko =

Maroko may refer to:

- Maroko, Lagos State, a neighborhood in Lagos, Nigeria
- Maroko, an alternative name for Morocco
- Maroko (film), a 1990 anime film directed by Mamoru Oshii
