= Kay Rufai =

British-Nigerian photographer, poet and artist

Kay Adekunle Rufai is a British-born Nigerian photographer, poet, filmmaker, mental health researcher, playwright, and immersive artist. Rufai was born in Poplar, London, but grew up in Nigeria and California. Rufai has done work in a number of countries, including the United Kingdom, USA, Ethiopia, Bhutan, Germany, Scandinavia, Mexico, Nigeria, and Colombia. Rufai's work addresses themes of mental health, masculinity, and community cohesion. His photography career began in 2013.

== Projects ==
=== S.M.I.L.E-ing Boys ===
The S.M.I.L.E-ing Boys Project was created as a direct response to a rise in youth stabbings in London around 2017-18 which led to a series of government approaches regarding increased criminalization of youth and police presence in minority communities. Kay was inspired by this to investigate the mental health provisions for the black youth community. He also wanted to remind the public that these are young boys, even though they are often treated as men. Rufai studied and travelled to Scandinavia and Bhutan to identify the factors of the happiness of those countries' populations, which were used to design 6-month-long photography, poetry and discussion-based art projects with 30 BAME boys between the ages of 13 and 25 from Lambeth. His trip was funded by the Wellcome Trust.

This project also produced a poetry album, Boy And A Bike (Miseducation Of Black Youth).

The results from this project were displayed in a number of exhibitions. In 2019, Kay was funded by the Arts Council to deliver the S.M.I.L.E-ing Boys exhibition and workshops at The Battersea Arts Centre during the Occupy Festival. This exhibition documented the boys' stories through poetry, photography and creative writing pieces. In the fall of 2019 at City Hall in London, Kay Rufai displayed 16 large-scale color photographs of teenage boys. The 16 photographs each depict a teenage boy smiling.

For another exhibition, Kay Rufai partnered with Brixton Village and had these photographs displayed across Marker Row for 12 weeks, beginning on March 12, 2020. This installation displayed 25 portrait flags hanging above the street for all visitors to see as they walk by. Brixton Village has said that as the year continues, the S.M.I.L.E-ing Boys Project will host a series of events and begin a partnership. Rufai also returned to the three schools the boys came from to display the photographs for staff and students to see.

=== S.M.I.L.E ===
The S.M.I.L.E project is an ongoing Wellcome Trust funded project using photography, poetry and multimedia to display the smiles of diverse people in Europe. S.M.I.L.E stands for Send Me Inspiring Loving Energy. Rufai wants to show people from a range of religions, races, ethnicities, gender and socio economic statuses. Rufai is aiming at challenging the stereotypes diverse people face every day in society and the perceptions attached to different groups. Rufai's photographs capture people's reasons for smiling and what would make them smile more. The project also aims at exploring the effects smiling has on mental health and people's overall wellbeing. Included with these photographs is a video interviewing the subject. Kay asks them two questions: What makes you smile? And what do you think would make you smile more if you had the power to make it happen? The S.M.I.L.E-ing Boys Project is an extension of this project.

=== T.R.I.B.E ===
T.R.I.B.E stands for Testing Realities Invariably Binding Everyone. This project uses photography and poetry to feature images of rarely photographed tribes from the remote regions of Southern Ethiopia. In addition to the photographs, this project also features poems and videos to document Kay's time with these tribes. The goal of this project is to reveal the commonalities across the human race and challenge the stereotypes imposed on different groups. The results of this project are compiled into a book available for purchase.

The opening night of this project hosted around 80-100 people and featured live drama and artistic reenactments of the tribes. The exhibition for this project was at the Espacio Gallery in Bethnal Green from March 15 to 20 in 2016.

=== S.T.R.E.N.G.T.H ===
Upcoming, S.T.R.E.N.G.T.H stands for Showing True Resilience Empowering New Generations To Hope. This project will explore the livelihood of the Egun people of Makoko, Lagos. These people's homes have been under constant threat of demolition and resettlement due to the migration from Cotonou to Lagos for more economic prospects. This project will also study the homeless communities in Skid Row, California and shed light on their resilience and strength, despite their challenging living conditions.

== Achievements ==
Kay was shortlisted by the House of Parliament to be the commissioned art-in-residence for the commemoration and celebration of the Race Relations Act in Britain. He was also funded by the British Council to deliver a month-long residency in San Diego, California using photography as a way to explore community cohesion and cultural awareness. He was to focus on young people in gangs and juvenile prisons as well as refugee communities across the Tijuana, Mexico Border. Rufai's award-winning S.M.I.L.E-ing Boys project was featured in the Guardian, The Voice, BBC, and the local press.
