= Mojisolaoluwa Alli Macaulay =

Nigerian politician

Hon. Mojisolaoluwa Kehinde Alli Macaulay
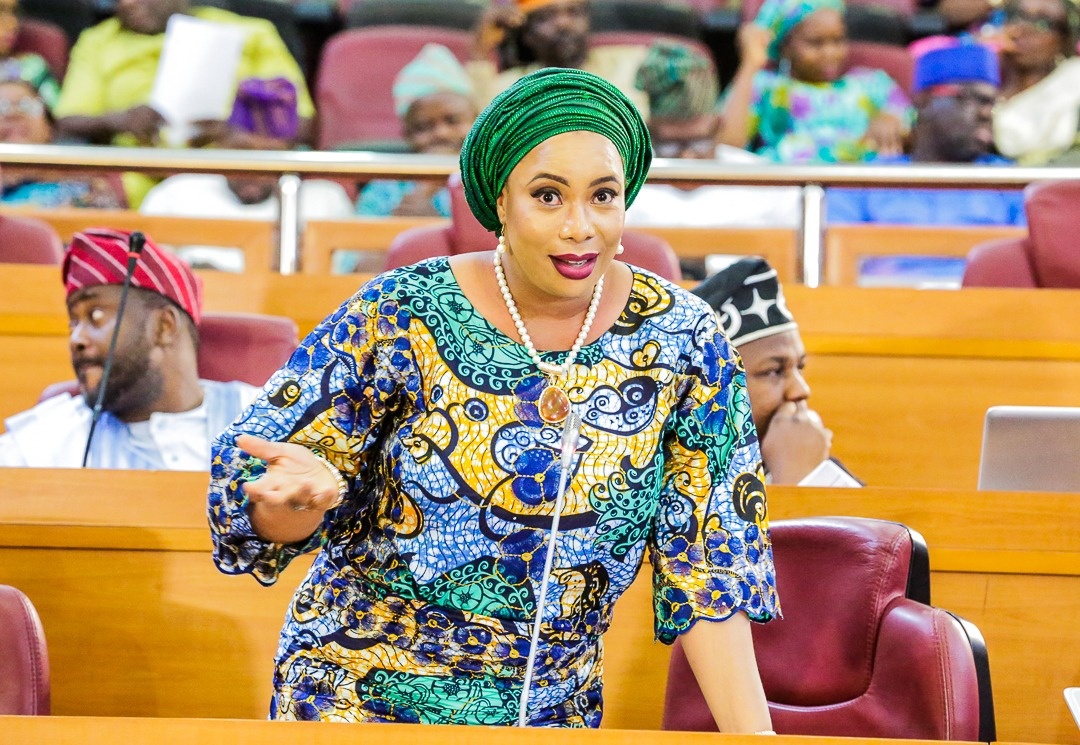

Executive Director (Operations), Nigeria Social Insurance Trust Fund (NSITF)
- In office 2019–2023
- Constituency: Lagos, Amuwo-Odofin 1

Chairman House Committee, Women Affairs, Poverty Alleviation & Job Creation
- In office 2019–2023

Councillor, Ward B1 Amuwo-Odofin
- In office 2010–2013

Personal details
- Born: October 10, 1977 (age 48) Surulere, Lagos State, Nigeria
- Party: All Progressives Congress (APC)
- Education: Subola Nursery & Primary School; Festac Primary School; Festac Girls' Secondary School; Navy Town Secondary School
- Alma mater: LASU
- Occupation: Lawyer; politician
- Profession: Legal practitioner
- Website: mojisolaoluwaallimacaulay.com

Mojisolaoluwa Kehinde Alli–Macaulay (née Alli; born 10 October 1977) is a Nigerian politician, lawmaker, and a member of the All Progressive Congress APC. She is currently the Executive Director (Operations) of the Nigeria Social Insurance Trust Fund (NSITF) She was the Lagos State House of Assembly legislator, representing Amuwo Odofin Constituency (2019-2023) and the Chairperson of the Lagos State House of Assembly Committee on Women Affairs, Poverty Alleviation, and Job Creation.

== Early life and education ==
Mojisolaoluwa Kehinde Alli was born in Surulere, Lagos State and she is from Lagos Island, in the southwestern part of Nigeria.

She had her primary education at Subola Nursery & Primary School (1982–84) and concluded at Festac Primary School (1984–90). Immediately after that she began her secondary school education at Festac Girls' Secondary School (1990–93), and completed at Navy Town Secondary School (1993–95), where she obtained the West African School Certificate.

She went on to obtain a Diploma at the Open University Milton Keynes, United Kingdom, in Social science (2003). In 2015, she was awarded a Bachelor Of Arts degree in History & International Relations from Lagos State University. In 2021, she obtained a degree in Law at Lagos State University.

== Career ==
=== Professional career ===
She began her career in Journalism and Broadcast media in 1997 as a Duty Announcer For Radio Lagos/Eko FM (1997–99). She worked immediately after that as a Newscaster/Presenter at MITV/STAR FM for three years (1999–2001), then moved on to NTA2 Channel 5 as a News Researcher, News presenter and Producer (2001–2002).

=== Political career ===
She contested as a councillor in WARD B1, Amuwo-Odofin, under the Action Congress of Nigeria and won (2010–13). She was formerly the Deputy Leader, Amuwo-Odofin Legislative Council, Amuwo-Odofin Local Government Area. In 2019, she contested and won in the Amuwo-Odofin Constituency 1. She was a member on the 9th Legislative Assembly, Lagos State House Of Assembly.

== Personal life ==
She is married to Jonathan Macaulay; they have two children.
