= Ikeja =

Capital city of Lagos State, Nigeria

- City and LGA
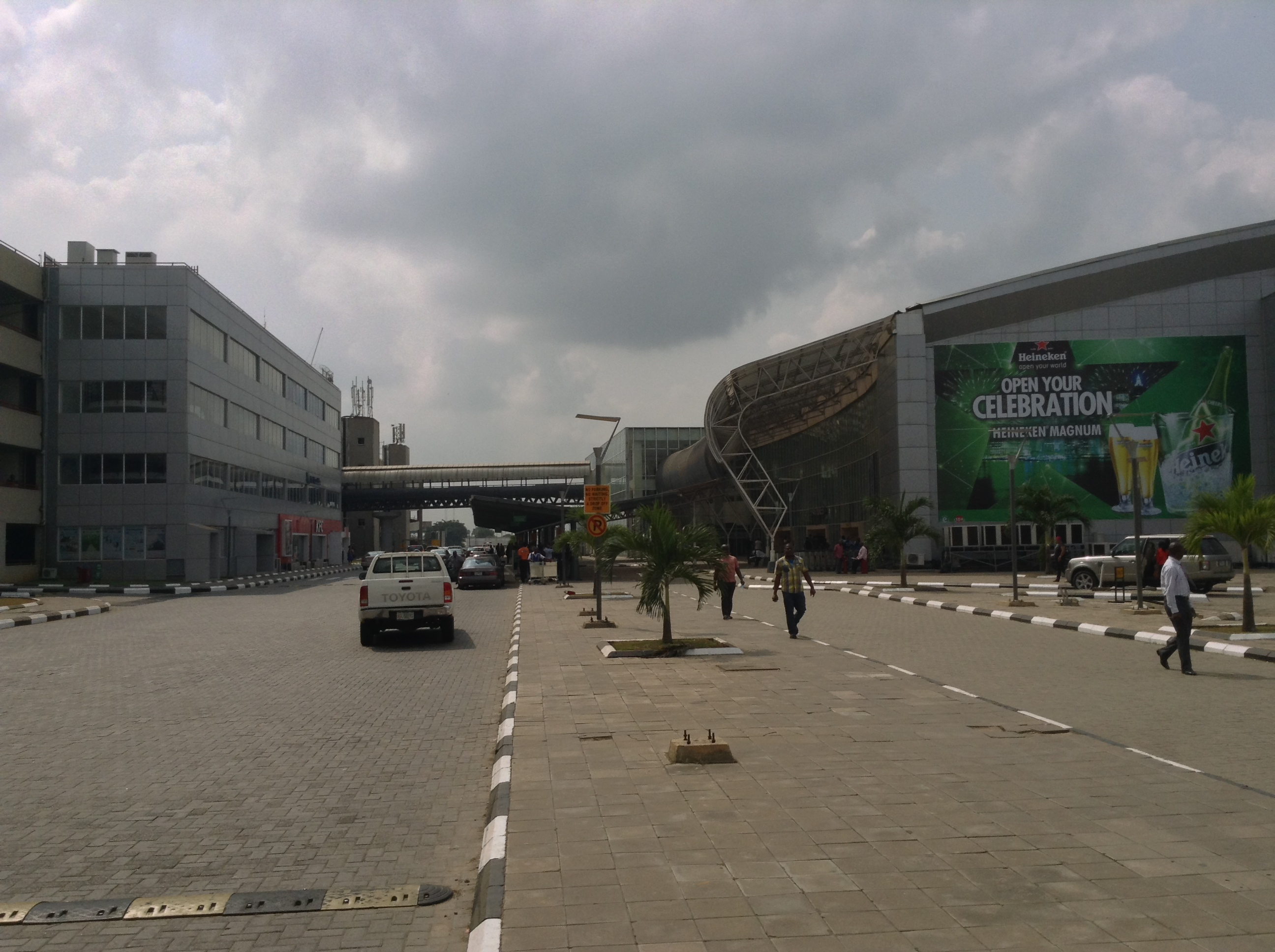
- Interactive map of Ikeja
- Location in Nigeria
- Coordinates: 6.60°N 3.35°E
- Country: Nigeria
- State: Lagos State

Area
  - Total: 49.92 km^{2} (19.27 sq mi)
- Elevation: 39 m (128 ft)

Population (2022 estimate)
  - Total: 470,200
  - Density: 9,419/km^{2} (24,400/sq mi)
- Time zone: UTC+1 (WAT)
- Climate: Aw

Ikeja is the capital city of Lagos State in southwestern Nigeria. Its population, as of the 2006 census, is 313,196. Prior to the emergence of military rule in the early 1980s, Ikeja was a residential and commercial town with shopping malls, pharmacies and government reservation areas. Ikeja is part of Metropolitan Lagos and lies 17 km northwest of Lagos city proper. The Murtala Muhammed International Airport is located in the city. Ikeja is also home to Femi Kuti's Africa Shrine and Lagbaja's Motherland, both venues for live music. Its Ikeja City Mall is the largest shopping mall on the Lagos State mainland. Ikeja also has its own radio station, broadcasting both in English (Eko FM) and in Yoruba (Radio Lagos).

== History ==
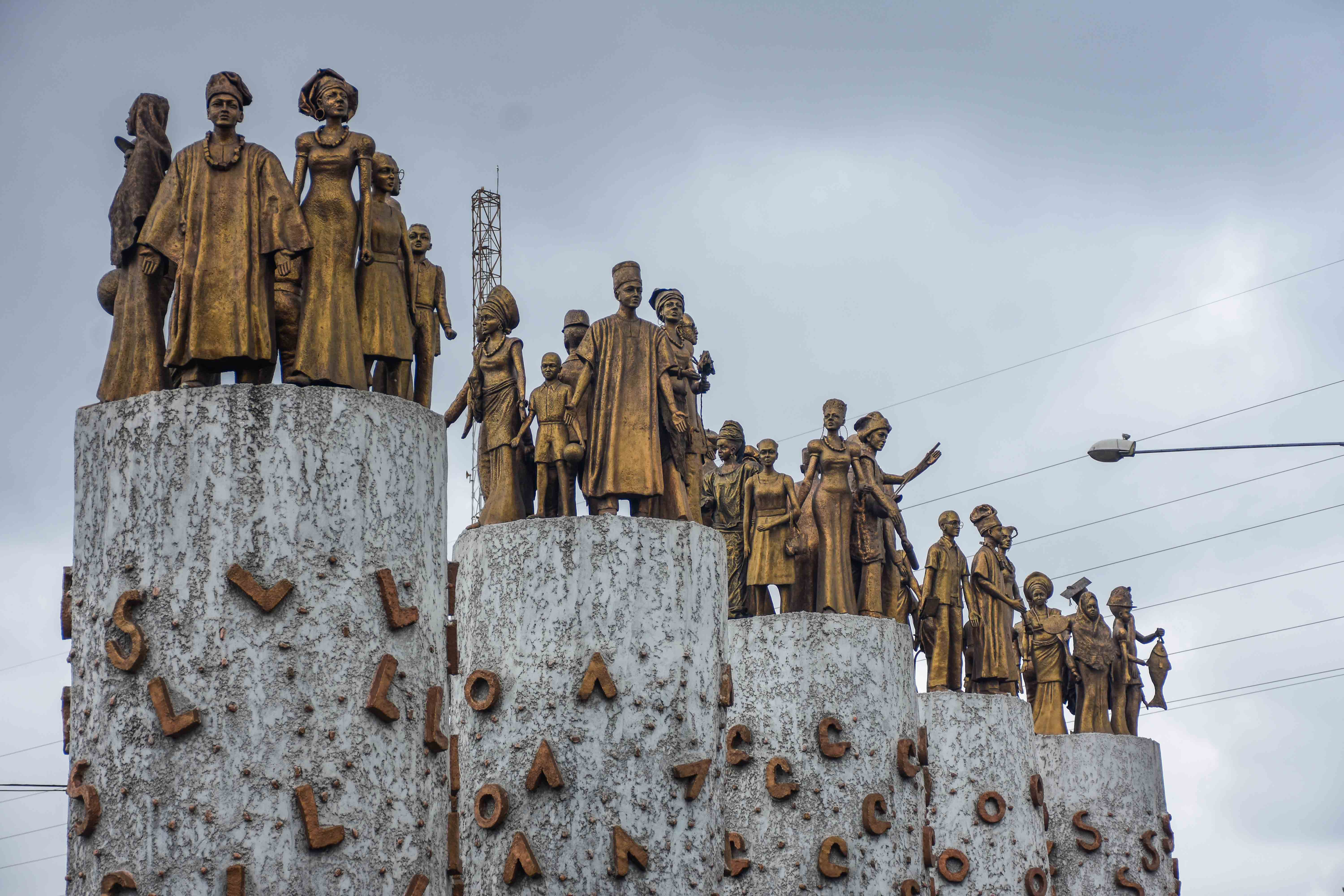
The Maryland monument

Ikeja, which was formally called "Akeja", was named after a deity of the Awori people of Ota. It was originally settled by the Awori people, and the area was raided for slaves until the mid-19th century. Early in the 20th century, it became an agricultural hinterland for Lagos. The opening of the Lagos-Ibadan railway in 1901 and the growth of Lagos as a port transformed Ikeja into a residential and industrial suburb of that city. In the mid-1960s an industrial estate was established, and in 1976 Ikeja became the capital of Lagos state. Johnson Solanke Tomori was an important in the history of Ikeja. He contributed to all the socio-cultural aspects of Ikeja, Agidingbi, Oregun, Alausa, Ojodu, and all the suburbs of Ikeja. His contributions date back to 1965, when he brought a higher level of social consciousness to Ikeja. The first king of Ikeja was His Royal Majesty Oba Momodu Illo, whom was a descendant of Akeja Oniyanrun and ruled Ikeja from 1957 till 1997.

== Government and Infrastructure ==
The local government administrative headquarters of Ikeja is located within the Ikeja Local Government Secretariat premises. As of January 2026, the Chairman of Ikeja Local Government is Comrade Akeem Olalekan Dauda.

The Federal Airports Authority of Nigeria has its headquarters in Ikeja on the grounds of Murtala Muhammad Airport. The Accident Investigation Bureau of the Nigerian government has its headquarter in Ikeja. The Nigerian Civil Aviation Authority (NCAA) has its head office in Aviation House on the grounds of the airport; this was formerly just the Lagos office.

== Economy ==
=== Airlines ===
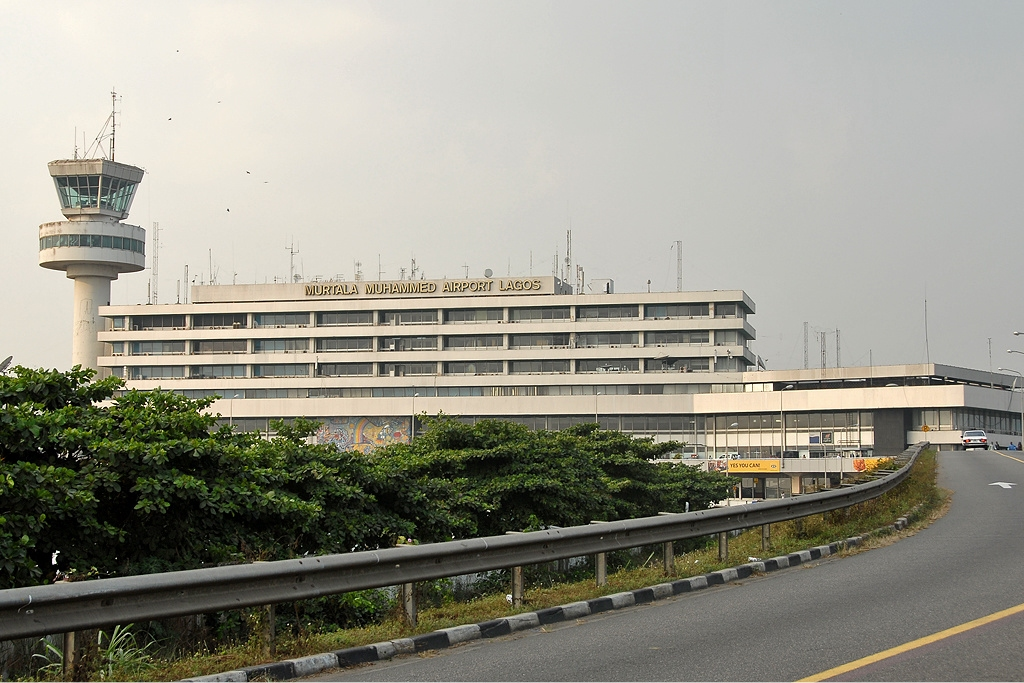
Murtala Muhammed International Airport

Several airlines have their head offices located in Ikeja. Arik Air's head office is in the Arik Air Aviation Centre on the grounds of Murtala Muhammed Airport. Aero Contractors has its head office on the grounds of Murtala Muhammed Airport. Other airlines with Ikeja head offices include Overland Airways, Air Peace, Associated Aviation, and Dana Air. In addition, Virgin Atlantic has its Nigerian office in "The Place" in Ikeja.

At one point, Nigeria Airways had its head office in Airways House. Before it was dissolved, Afrijet Airlines had its head office in the NAHCO Building on the grounds of the airport. Bellview Airlines had its headquarters in the Bellview Plaza. Other now-defunct airlines with head offices in Ikeja include Air Nigeria (formerly Nigerian Eagle and Virgin Nigeria Airways), on the 9th Floor of Etiebets Place, Sosoliso Airlines, and ADC Airlines.

=== Television studios ===
Ikeja is home to Nigeria's most important television studios, such as Channels TV and African Independent TV, as well as associated advertising agencies.

=== Computer Village ===
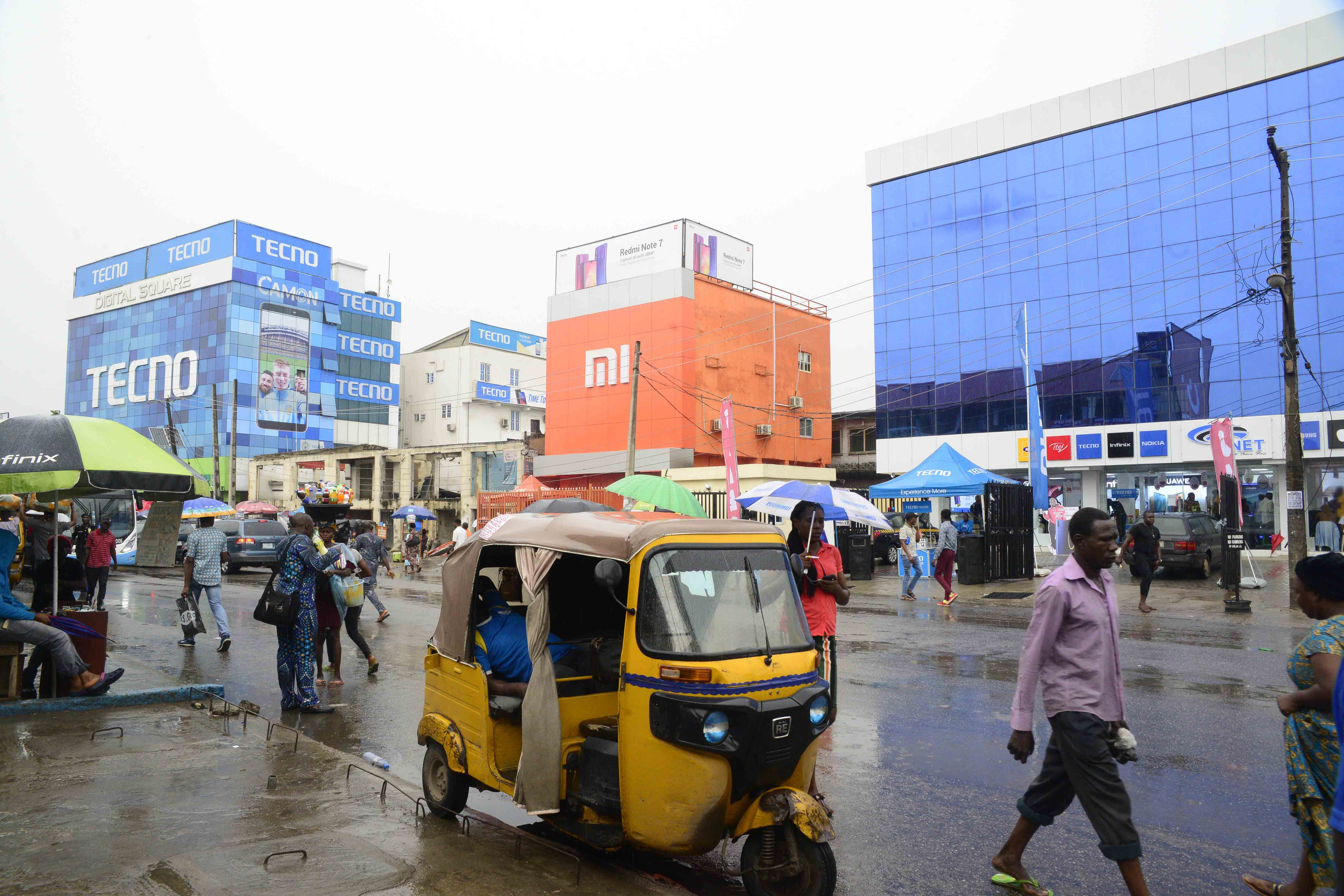
Computer village

Ikeja is home to a large computer market, popularly known as Otigba. Begun in 1997 as a small market of only 10 shops, the current market now has well over 10,000. While most vendors provide the expected computer sales and repair services, it is also possible to find sales and repair services for various types of office equipment and electronic devices.

By 2019, the little shops at Computer Village had grown to multiple-storey shopping malls. Many of the single-floor buildings have been developed into larger buildings, housing several shops that distribute and repair mobile phones, laptops, printers and other electronic devices. Nearly all the major Nigerian banks have branches around the market.

As the market is unplanned, it has experienced difficulties in its growth, with some local residents expressing frustration at the market's expansion. Traffic around the area has become very congested, and it can be almost impossible to find a place to park. Furthermore, the electrical infrastructure, which was already unreliable, has become overloaded by the new market, which requires significant amounts of electricity to demonstrate working computer products to potential customers.

=== Brewery ===
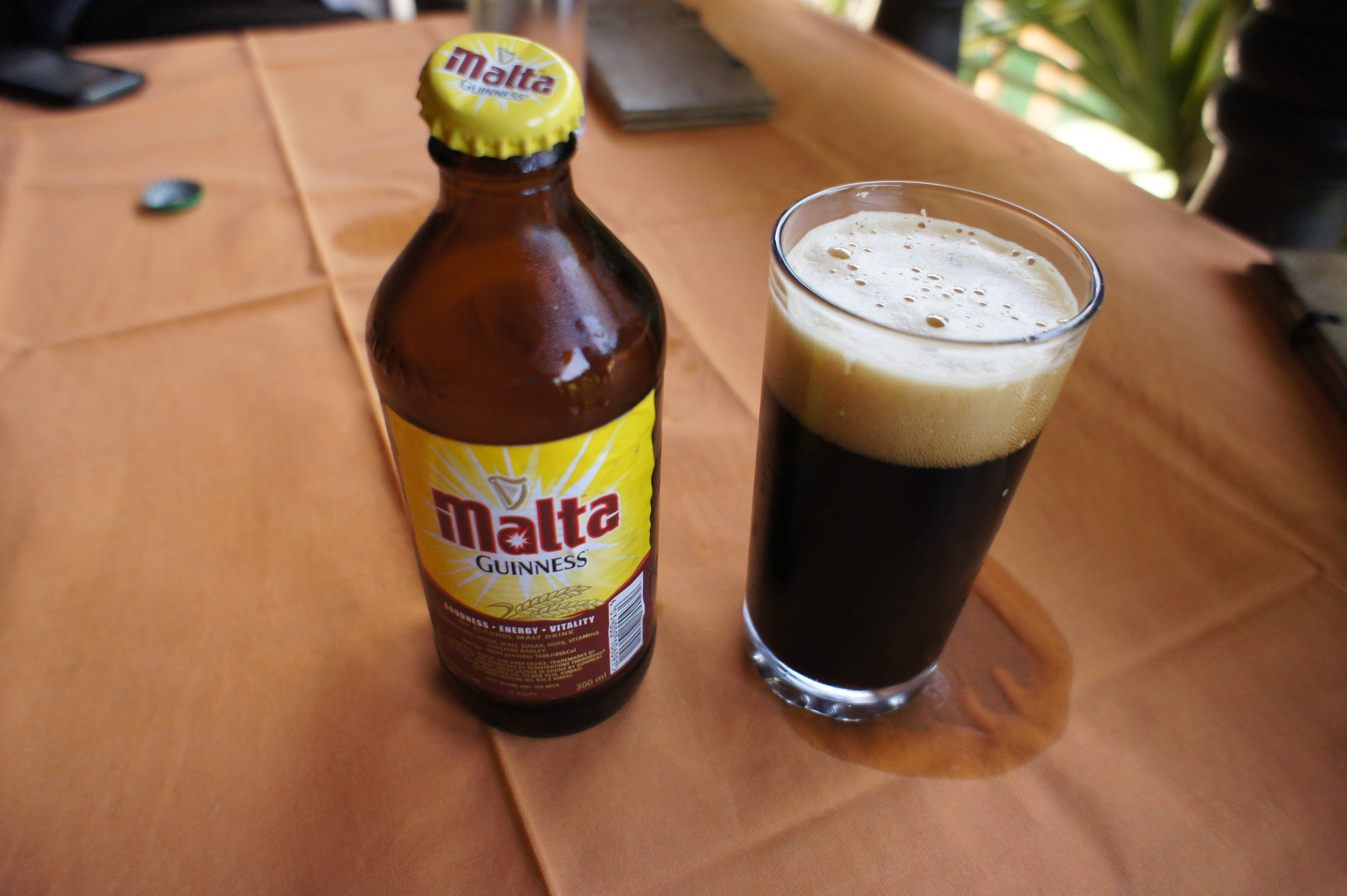
"Malt-based soft drink" from Ikeja

The Guinness brewery produces its famous beer in Ikeja. The brewery also produces non-alcoholic and halal malt beer, which is part of the "Lagos' way of life".

=== Pharmaceutical industry ===
60% of West Africa's pharmaceutical production takes place in Nigeria. The majority of Nigerian pharmaceutical manufacturers have their main production site in Ikeja. This includes May & Baker, one of the three largest manufacturers of medicines.

=== Diverse ===
A slum in Ikeja was selected by C. J. Obasi as a production location for the 2014 Nollywood thriller, Ojuju.

Ikeja also has a main market area called Oba Momodu Illo (Obada) market in Ipodo. This market contains many shops and makeshift stalls where merchants display and sell produce, meat, fish, grains, and other groceries.

== Tourism ==
=== Museums ===
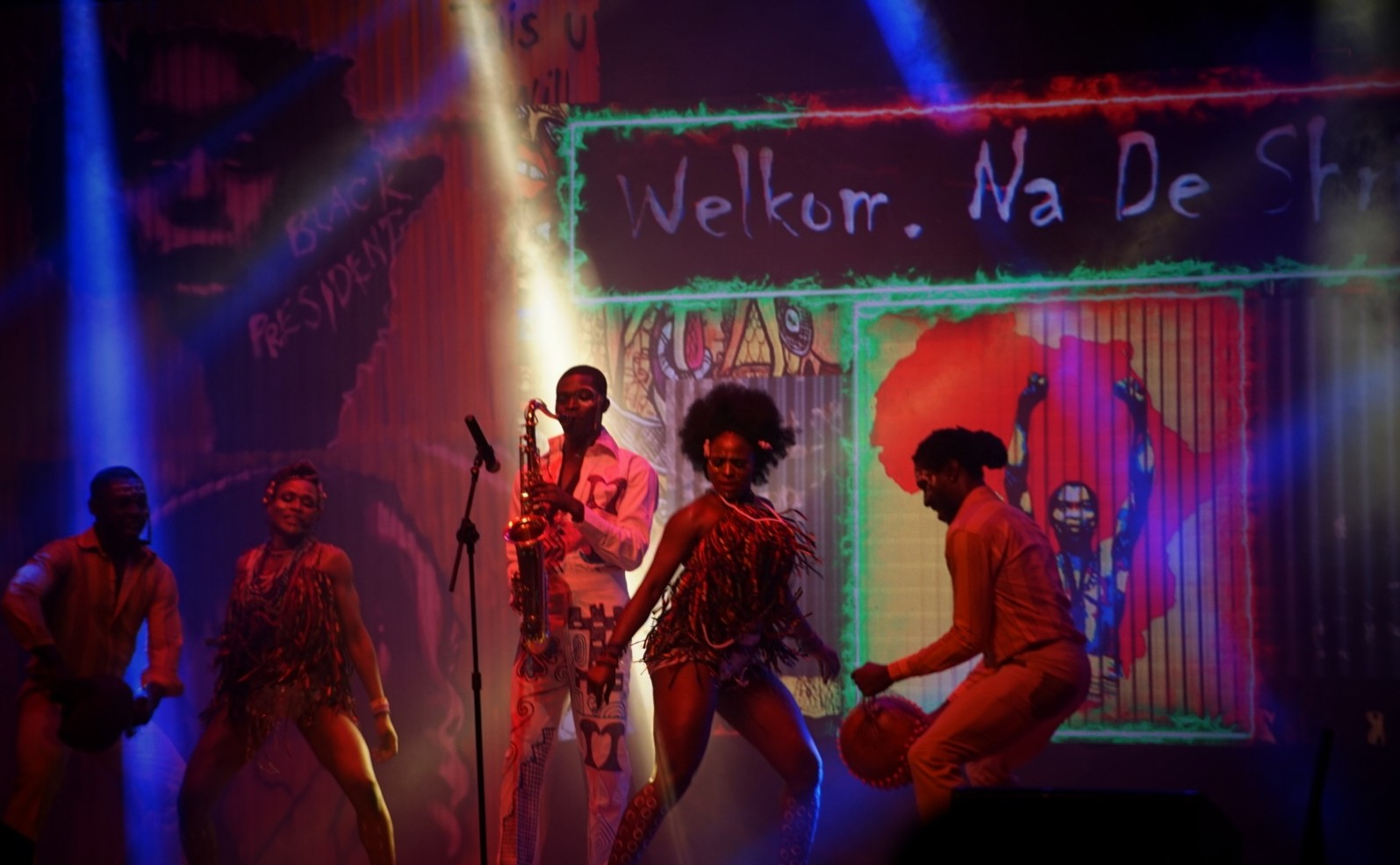
Kalakuta Museum

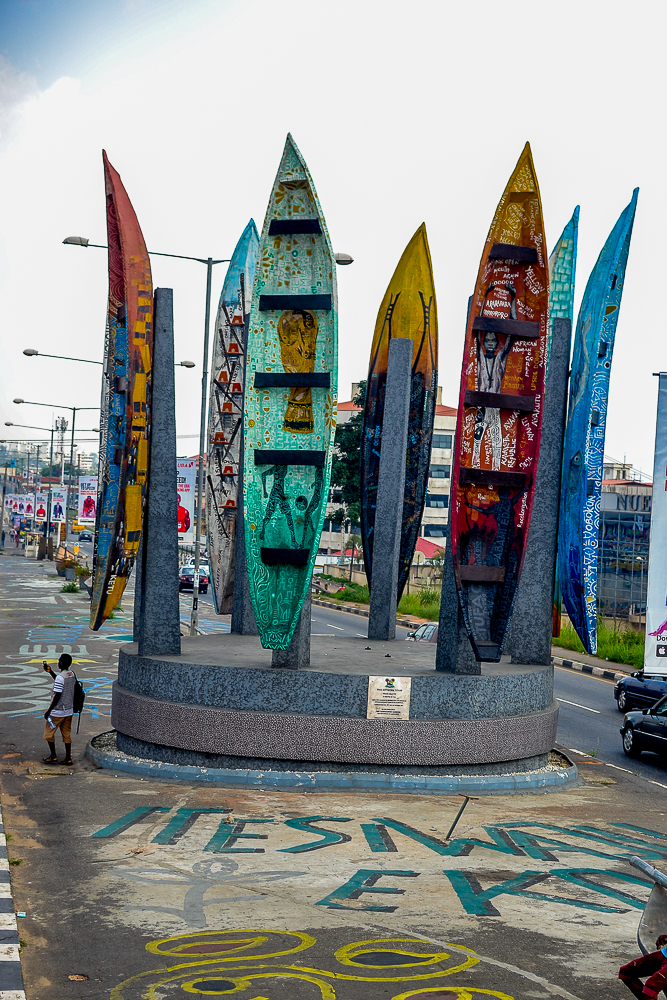
The Canoe monument

The Kalakuta Museum commemorates the late musician Fela Kuti, who probably had a formative role in Nigeria's music world comparable to that of Bob Marley in Jamaica. The building was the musician's second home in Lagos after soldiers burnt down his first home in Surulere in February 1977, raped female family members and injured Kuti's mother, a respected trade union leader, so badly that she died as a result. Kuti built a new house in Ikeja, but it fell into disrepair after his death and had to be renovated as a museum in 2012. Kuti's grave is located next to the museum. Inside the museum, the walls are covered with historical photos, posters, paintings, murals, record covers and newspaper cuttings. Some of Fela's musical instruments are on display, including his colourfully painted, distinctive tenor saxophone. Fela's shoes and shirts are on display in rows, as are stage suits and the fur coat he wore on tour in Europe and the USA. There is a rooftop café, and visitors can stay overnight in one of several air-conditioned rooms with en-suite bathrooms.

=== Parks and squares ===
- The Johnson Jakande Tinubu Park (JJT) is a public park located in Ikeja, the capital of Lagos. The park which was commissioned by the then Lagos State Governor, Akinwunmi Ambode in December 2017 as a recreational Center.
- The Kanu Ndubuisi Park is a public park and recreational center located in Ikeja, Lagos. It is a green space created and managed by the Lagos State Parks and Garden Agency. The park has a lawn tennis court, a basketball court, a play area for children, seats and benches, patios and sheds and snacks stands. Located at Mobolaji Johnson Ave, Oregun, Ikeja 101233, Lagos
- Dr Oluyomi Abayomi Finnih Recreational Park located at 3 Opebi Link Rd, Allen, Ikeja 101233, Lagos.
- Abiola Garden Ojota

=== Music pub ===
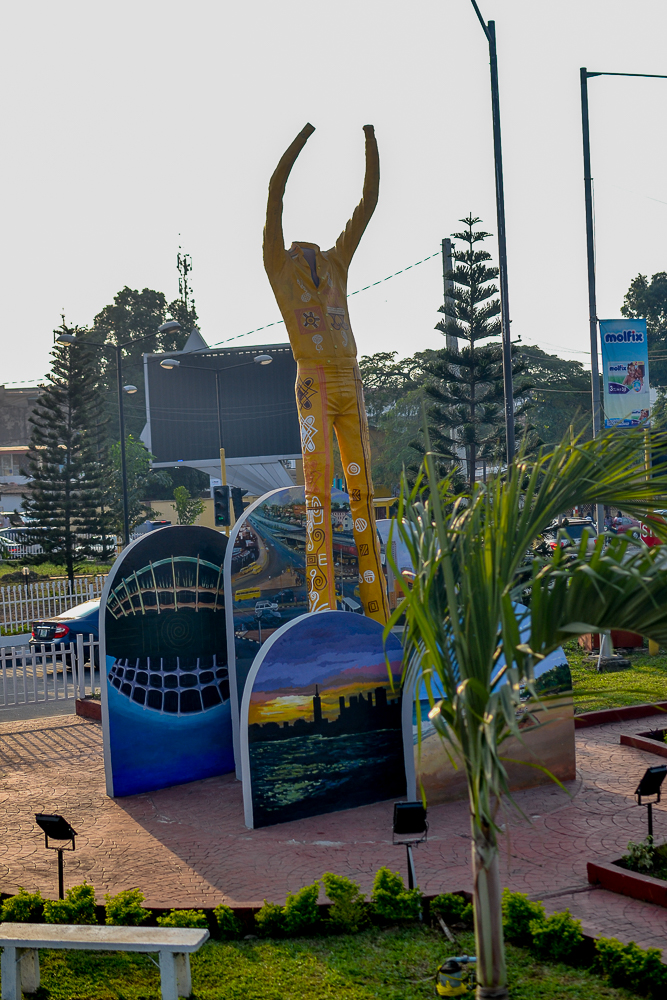
Fela monument

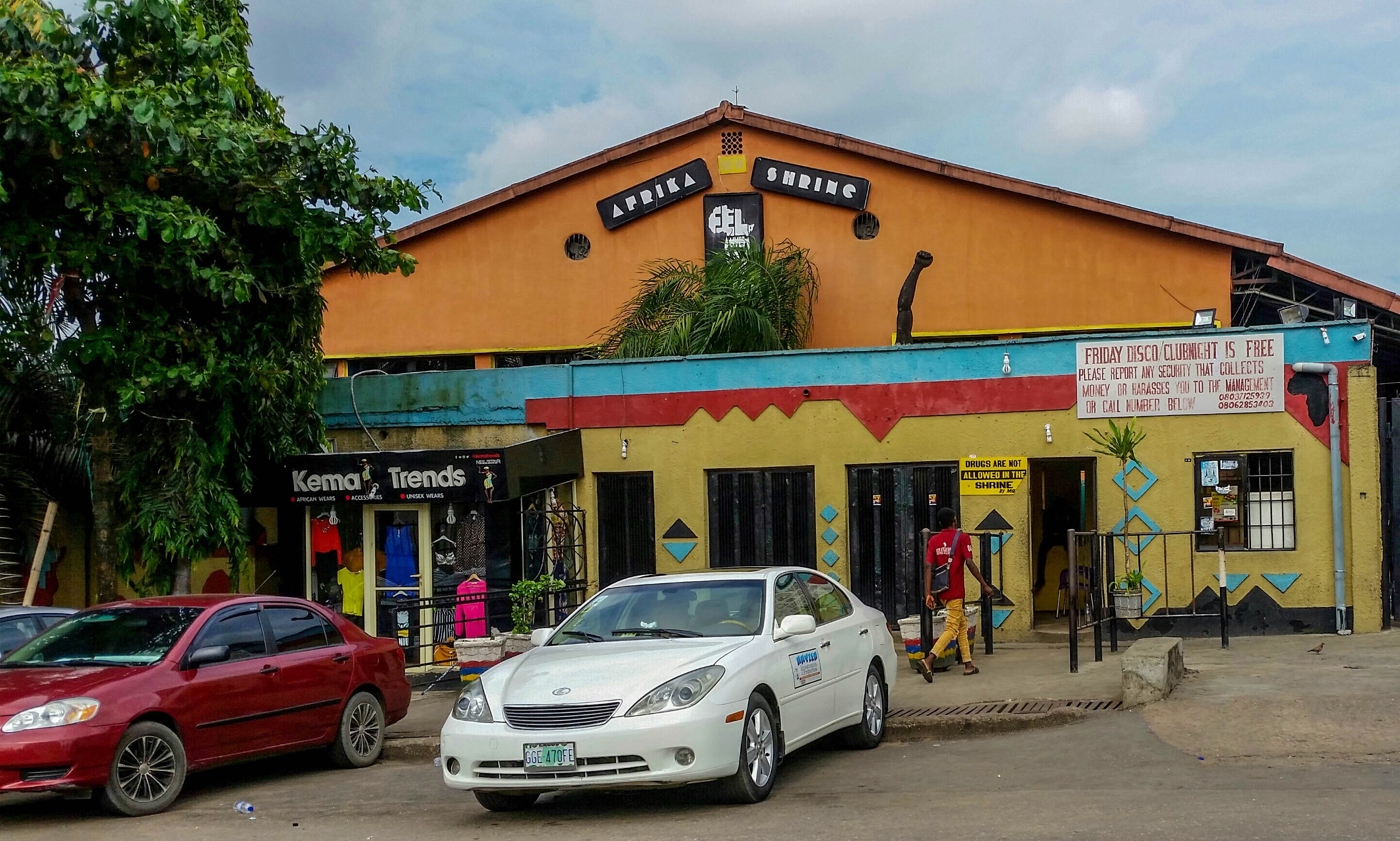
New Afrika Shrine

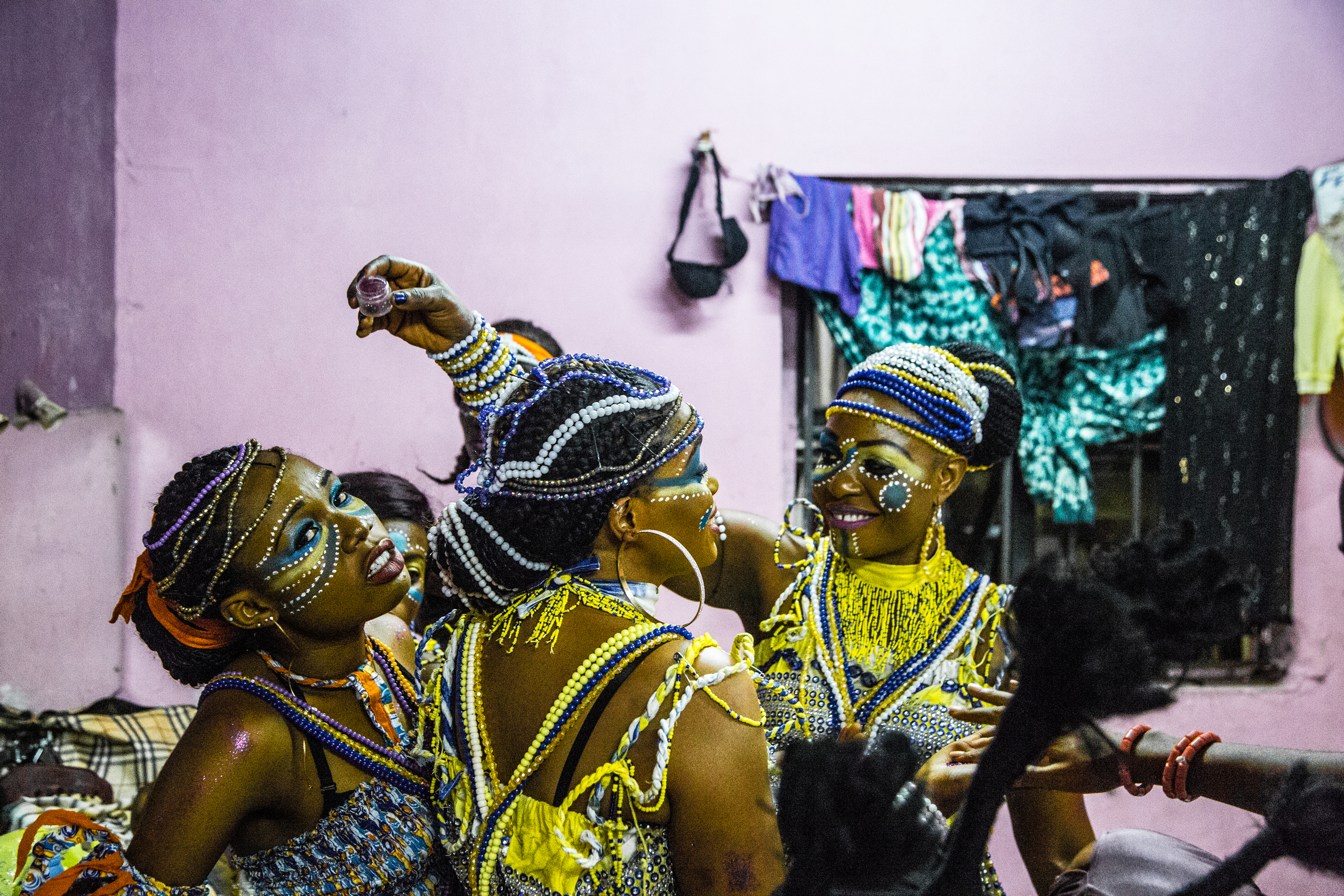
Makeup for Felabration festival

Contrary to what the name suggests, the New Afrika Shrine in Ikeja is not a shrine, but a music bar run by the descendants of Fela Kuti. It unfolds its special charm when live music is playing; it is also the only place in Lagos where you can legally smoke a joint. The Afrika Shrine was Fela's second home until a few weeks before his death in 1997, after which it fell into disrepair. The New Afrika Shrine, opened in 2000, was built by his family. Their main concern was to honour and preserve the contribution Fela and the Shrine have made to the local community and the overall development of post-colonial Africa. Most events at the New Afrika Shrine are free of charge. The new club is four times the size of the original Shrine and seats two and a half thousand people. Overheads are covered by the sale of food, drinks and merchandise. Admission is usually 500 naira, half a US dollar. The club has a small library, pool tables and chill-out areas and organises educational and outreach activities.

== Climate ==
It has a Tropical Wet and Dry or Savannah. The majority of the year's months get heavy rainfall. The brief dry season has very little impact on the climate as a whole. The Köppen-Geiger scale rates this area's climate as Aw. Ikeja's typical temperature is 26.4 °C (79.5 °F). About 1,645 mm (64.8 in) of precipitation falls here each year.

The summers in Ikeja are ill-defined because of the city's proximity to the equator. Visitation is most often in January, July, August, September, October, November, and December.

Climate data for Ikeja (Murtala Muhammed International Airport) (1991–2020)
| Month | Jan | Feb | Mar | Apr | May | Jun | Jul | Aug | Sep | Oct | Nov | Dec | Year |
|---|---|---|---|---|---|---|---|---|---|---|---|---|---|
| Record high °C (°F) | 36.7 (98.1) | 38.9 (102.0) | 38 (100) | 36.2 (97.2) | 35.8 (96.4) | 34 (93) | 33.1 (91.6) | 32.3 (90.1) | 37.7 (99.9) | 39 (102) | 35.5 (95.9) | 36.8 (98.2) | 39.0 (102.2) |
| Mean daily maximum °C (°F) | 33.2 (91.8) | 34.0 (93.2) | 33.7 (92.7) | 33.0 (91.4) | 31.9 (89.4) | 30.1 (86.2) | 28.8 (83.8) | 28.7 (83.7) | 29.3 (84.7) | 30.6 (87.1) | 32.3 (90.1) | 33.2 (91.8) | 31.6 (88.9) |
| Daily mean °C (°F) | 28.3 (82.9) | 29.4 (84.9) | 29.5 (85.1) | 29.0 (84.2) | 28.1 (82.6) | 26.8 (80.2) | 26.0 (78.8) | 25.9 (78.6) | 26.3 (79.3) | 27.0 (80.6) | 28.1 (82.6) | 28.3 (82.9) | 27.7 (81.9) |
| Mean daily minimum °C (°F) | 23.5 (74.3) | 24.8 (76.6) | 25.3 (77.5) | 25.0 (77.0) | 24.4 (75.9) | 22.8 (73.0) | 22.7 (72.9) | 22.6 (72.7) | 22.5 (72.5) | 22.5 (72.5) | 22.2 (72.0) | 23.4 (74.1) | 23.5 (74.3) |
| Record low °C (°F) | 16 (61) | 19.2 (66.6) | 20 (68) | 19 (66) | 13.7 (56.7) | 20 (68) | 18 (64) | 19.9 (67.8) | 19.3 (66.7) | 19.3 (66.7) | 11 (52) | 11 (52) | 11 (52) |
| Average precipitation mm (inches) | 23.7 (0.93) | 43.6 (1.72) | 71.4 (2.81) | 141.6 (5.57) | 205.3 (8.08) | 291.0 (11.46) | 195.1 (7.68) | 72.4 (2.85) | 205.8 (8.10) | 183.1 (7.21) | 93.8 (3.69) | 22.6 (0.89) | 1,549.3 (61.00) |
| Average precipitation days (≥ 1.0 mm) | 1.3 | 2.5 | 5.1 | 7.4 | 10.6 | 15.1 | 11.3 | 7.3 | 12.8 | 11.5 | 5.7 | 1.7 | 92.3 |
| Average relative humidity (%) | 77.7 | 81.3 | 84.2 | 86.0 | 86.7 | 88.2 | 88.5 | 88.0 | 89.0 | 88.2 | 84.3 | 78.8 | 85.1 |
Source: NOAA

=== Temperature ===
With an average daily high temperature above 32 °C (90 °F), the hot season lasts for 4.4 months, from 12 December to 25 April. Ikeja experiences its warmest month of the year in March, with an average high of 33 °C (91 °F) and low of 26 °C (78 °F).

With an average daily maximum temperature below 29 °C (84 °F), the chilly season lasts 3.2 months, from 23 June to 30 September. In Ikeja, August is the coldest month of the year, with an average low of 23 °C (74 °F) and high of 28 °C (82 °F).

=== Cloudy ===
In Ikeja, there is a substantial seasonal change in the average proportion of the sky that is covered with clouds throughout the year.

In Ikeja, the clearer season starts around 8 November and lasts for 3.2 months, finishing around 13 February.

The sky is clear, mostly clear, or partly clear 51% of the time on average in December, the clearest month of the year in Ikeja.

Around 13 February the year's cloudier period starts, lasting for 8.8 months, and ends around 8 November.

In Ikeja, April is the month with the most clouds, with the sky being overcast or mostly cloudy 87% of the time.

== Pollution ==
Premium Times’ Oladeinde Olawoyin, who investigated the matter, reports the dangers that residents face due to the exposure and continuous use of polluted water. Residents of St. Finbarr’s College road in Akoka have been exposed to hazards arising from water pollution caused by a fuel leakage in the community.

== Communities ==
Districts in the city include:

- Anifowose;
- Oregun;
- Ojodu;
- Opebi;
- Akiode;
- Alausa;
- Agidingbi;
- Ogba;
- Magodo;
- Maryland;
- Onigbongbo;
- Government Reserved Area (GRA) Ikeja.

== Tourist centres ==
- Isheri/River Ogun – Cradle of Awori and Lagos indigenous population
- Lagos State Government Secretariat Ikeja House, Alausa, Ikeja
- Lagos State House of Assembly Complex [Parliament Building], Alausa, Ikeja
- Lagos State Records and Archives Bureau, PSSDC Road, Magodo, Kosofe
- Lagos Television and Radio Lagos/Eko F.M, Agidingbi, Ikeja
- LASU Ethnography Museum, Oba Ogunji Road, Ogba, Agege
- Murtala Mohammed International Airport, Ikeja [Hub of aviation in West Africa]
- Statue of Lagos Idejo Chiefs – megacity’s traditional land gentry
- Third Mainland Bridge/Outer Ring Road Complex.

== Gallery ==
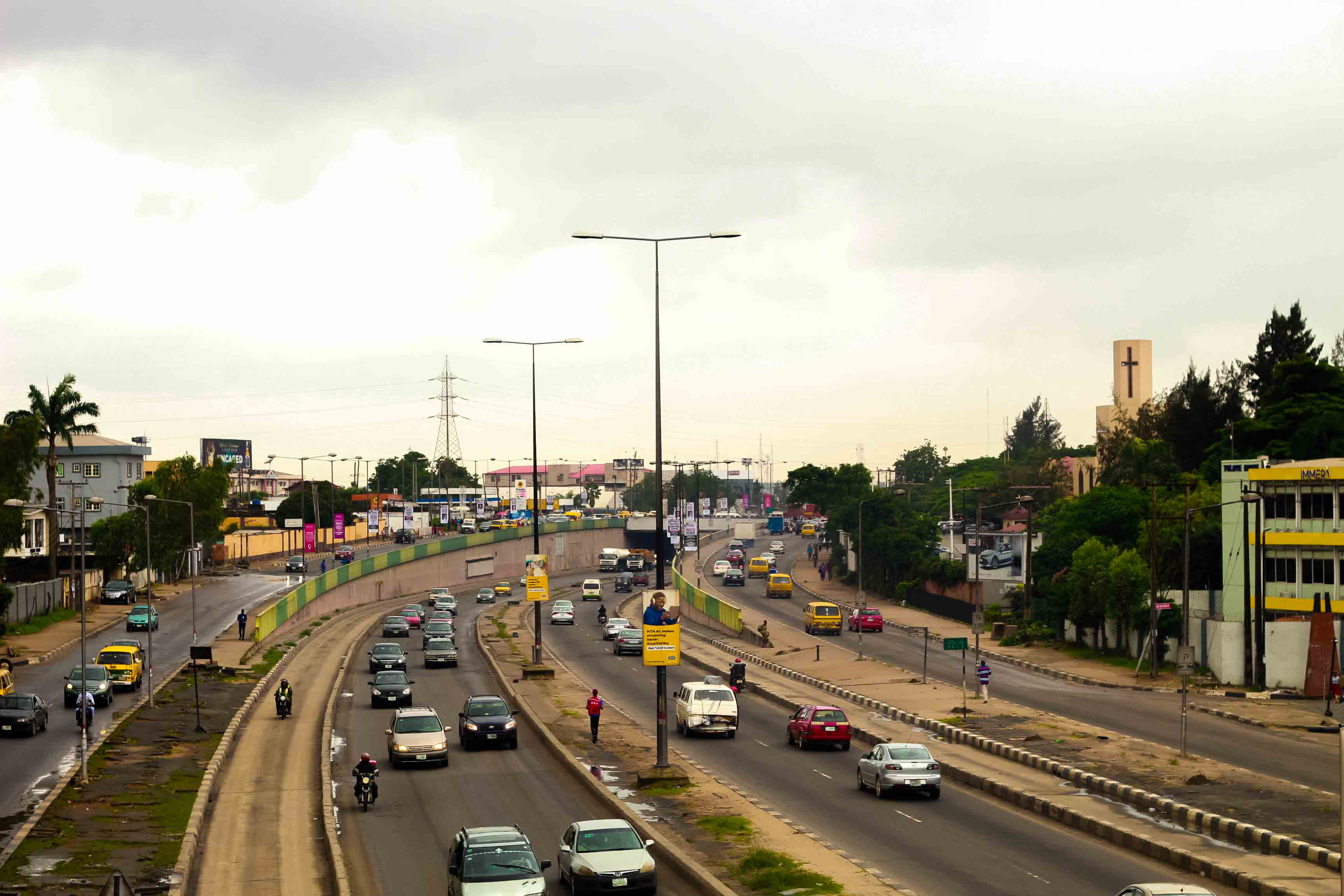
Maryland Lane

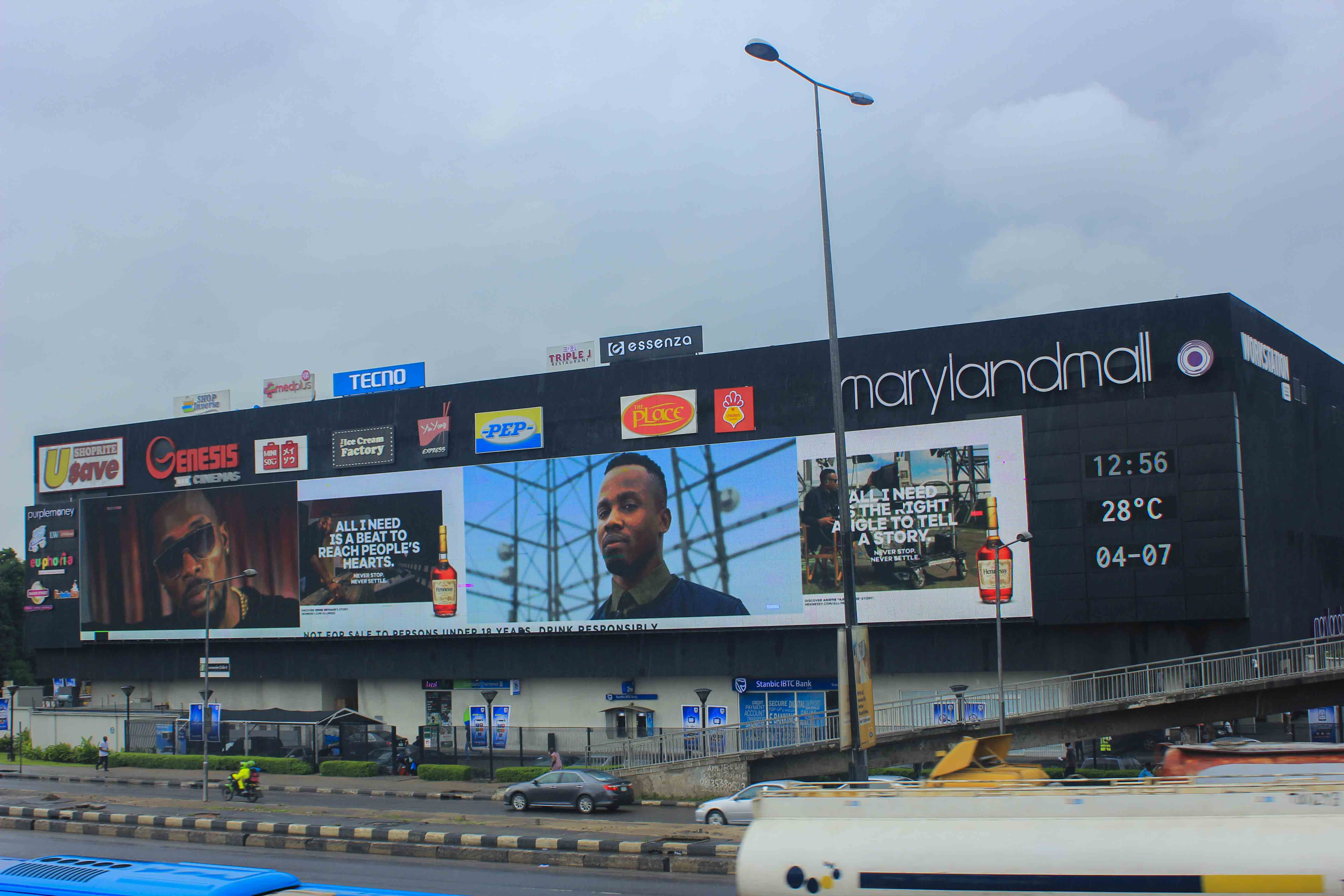
Maryland mall

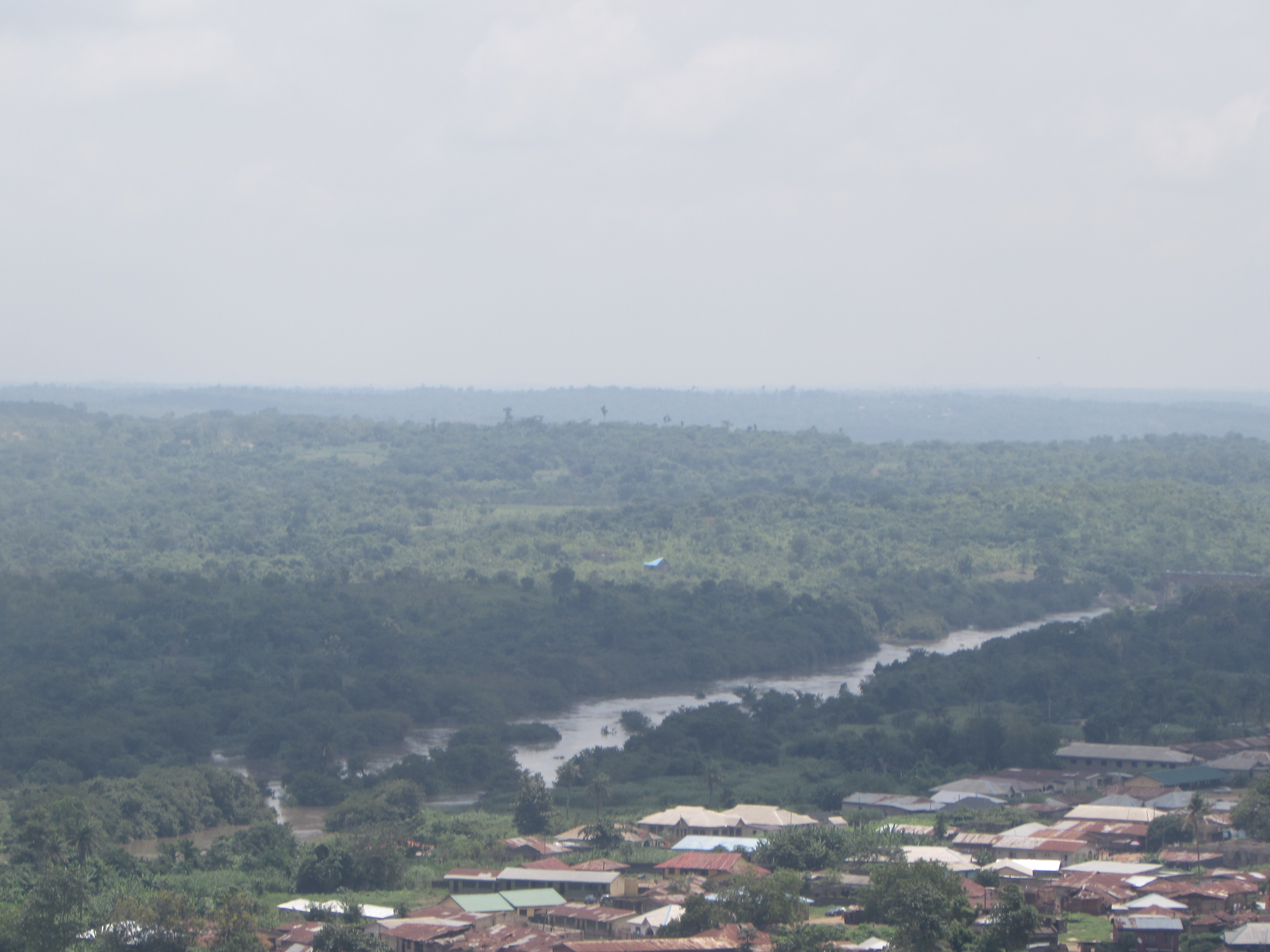
Ogun river

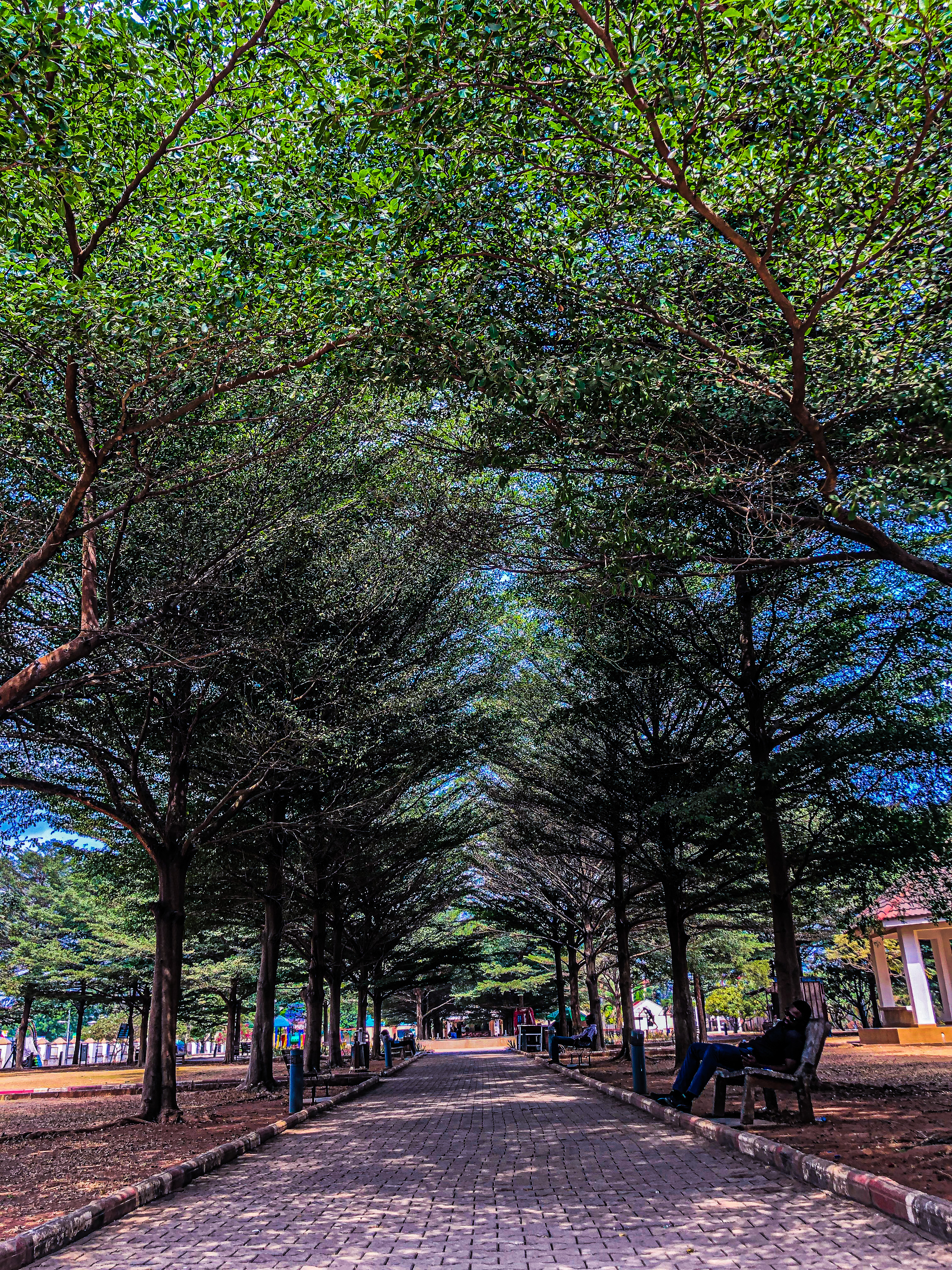
Kanu Ndubuisi Park

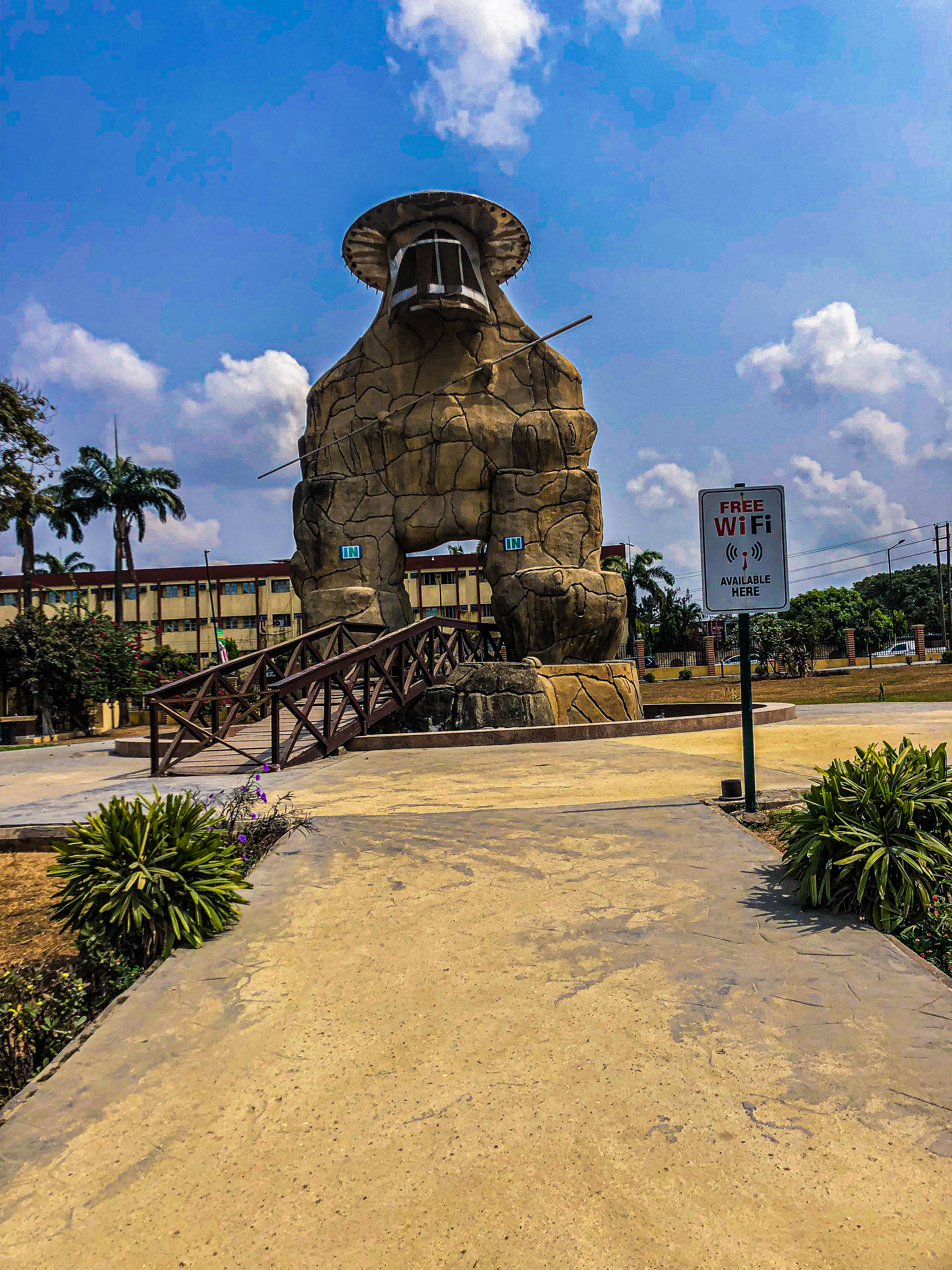
Johnson Jakande Tinubu Park

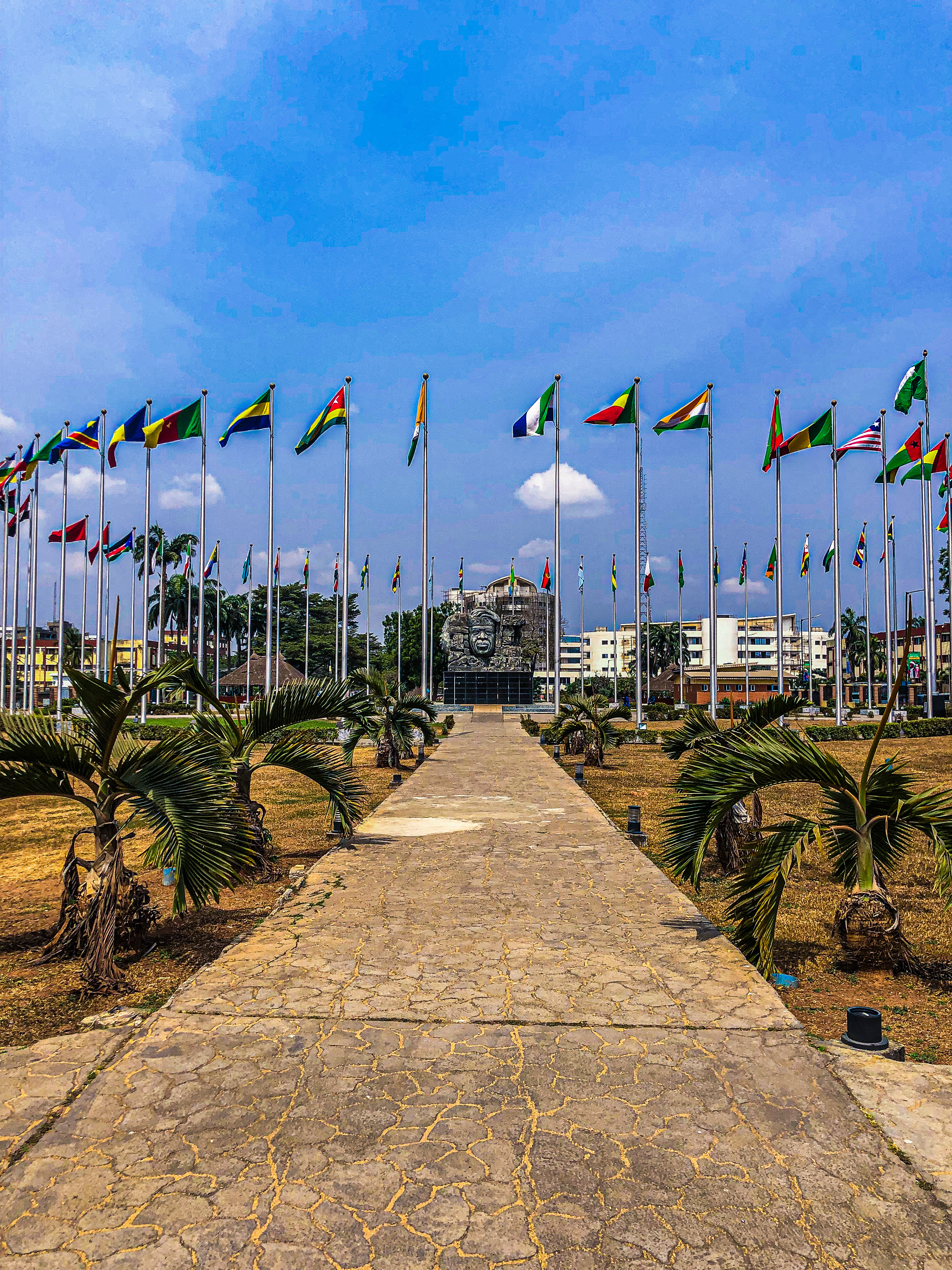
Johnson Jakande Tinubu Park

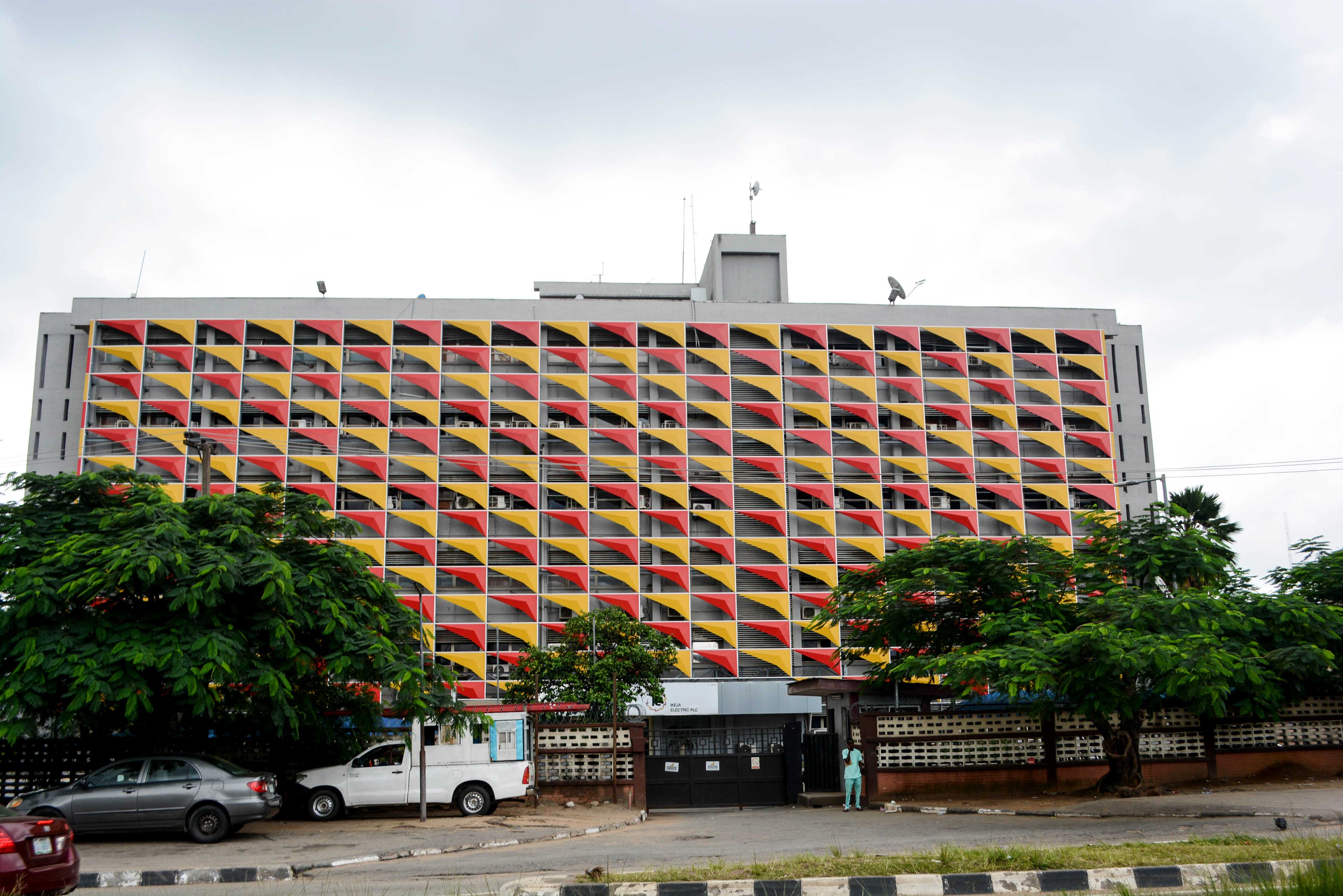
Ikeja Electrical Distribution Company (IKEDC) headquarter

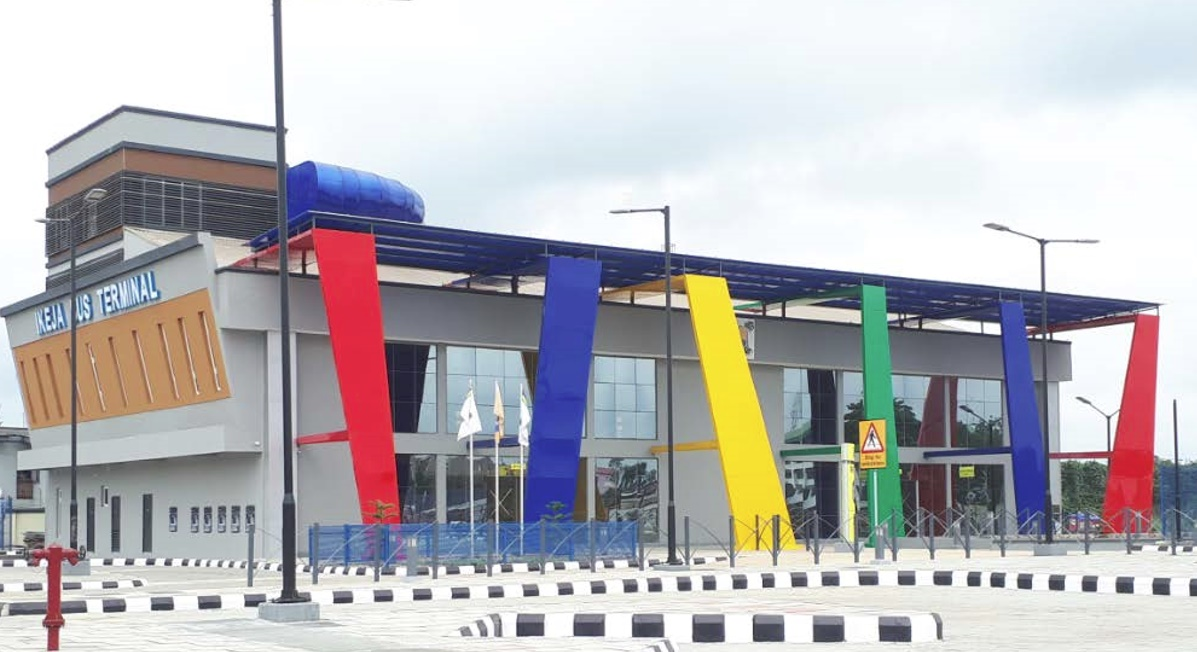
Bus terminal

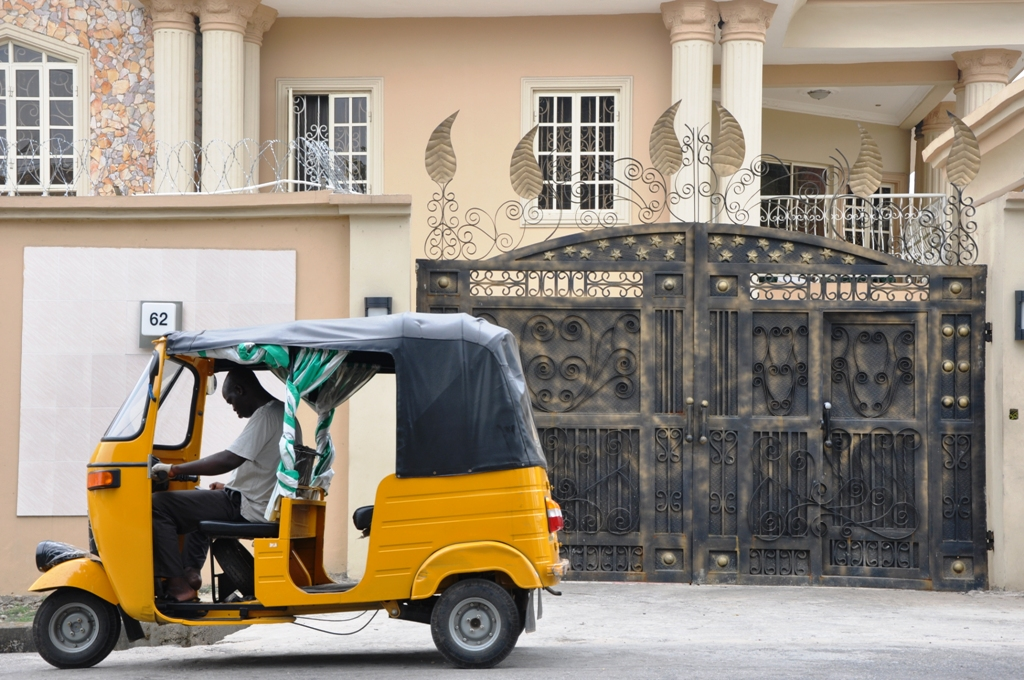
Keke in Ikeja

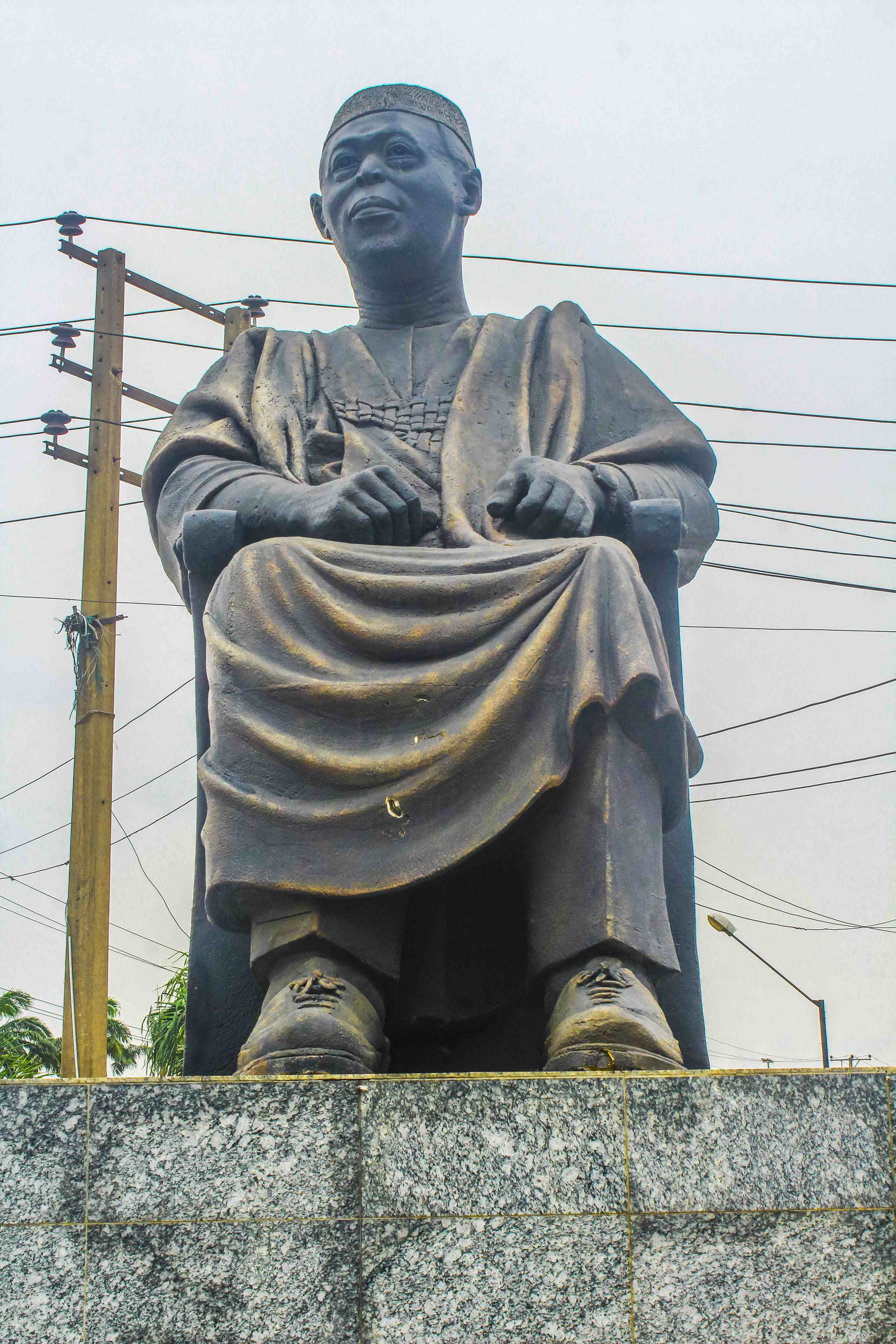
Statue of Obafemi Awolowo

== See also ==
- Railway stations in Nigeria
- Eko Hospital
- Surulere
