= Massey Street Children's Hospital =

Massey Children's Hospital, Lagos

Geography
- Location: 18 Massey Street, Lagos Island, Lagos, Nigeria
- Coordinates: 6°27′18″N 3°23′32″E

Organisation
- Religious affiliation: None
- Affiliated university: Lagos State Ministry of Health

Services
- Emergency department: Yes
- Beds: 85

History
- Opened: 1914

Massey Children's Hospital (a.k.a. Massey Street Children's Hospital) is a 85-bed pediatric state-owned treatment hospital headquartered in Lagos Island, Lagos State. Founded in 1914, it is owned by the government of Lagos State.

== History ==
Massey Children’s Hospital was founded in 1914 as Lagos's first general outpatient hospital. This makes it the oldest children's hospital in West Africa. It became a maternity hospital in 1926, the first in Lagos. In 1961, it was converted to a full children's hospital.

== Specialties ==
- dental
- physiotherapy
- optometry
- nutrition & dietetics
- radiology
- social welfare

== New hospital project ==
The Lagos State government started a new 7-storey Massey Street Children's Hospital building in the Adeniji Adele area of the city of Lagos. The project was kicked off in April 2021 by the governor, Babajide Sanwo-Olu.

== See also ==
- List of hospitals in Lagos
