= Lagos Island General Hospital =

General Hospital (Odan), Lagos
- Lagos State Ministry of Health
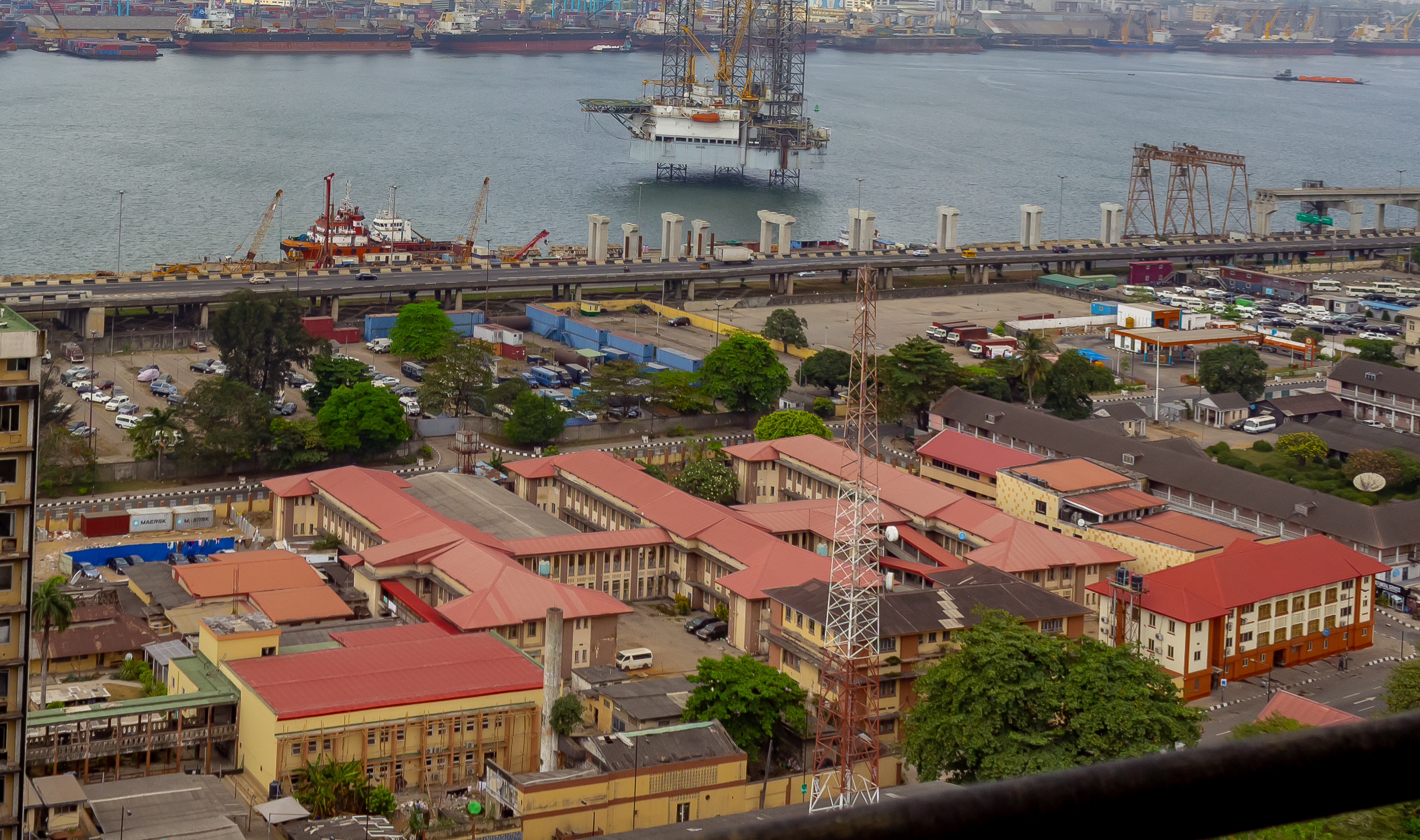

Geography
- Location: 1–3, Broad Street, Odan, Lagos Island, Lagos, Lagos State, Nigeria
- Coordinates: 6.4474°N 3.3968°E

Organisation
- Care system: Public
- Type: General

Services
- Emergency department: Yes
- Beds: 250

History
- Founded: 1893

Links
- Website: www.ghlagos.org.ng/about/
- Other links: List of hospitals in Lagos

General Hospital, Lagos, is the oldest hospital in Nigeria.

== History ==
General Hospital, Lagos Odan is situated in Odan, Lagos Island, between Broad Street and Marina in the central business district. The hospital is one of the several general hospitals of the Lagos State Government. It was established in 1893 as a British military hospital, and was the first general hospital in Nigeria.

On 1 October 1960, the hospital was handed over to the Federal Government and on 7 May 1967, it was finally taken over by the Lagos State Government. The Nursing School was established in 1952. Other services which commenced included general outpatient services, surgery, and obstetrics and gynecology. The obstetrics and gynaecology department was transferred to Massey Street (Ita Eleiye), where most prominent Lagosians were born. The Nigerian Medical Association (NMA) was established at the hospital. The hospital has served as a training center for doctors, pharmacists, nurses, radiographers and medical technologists across the country.

== CMD ==
The current Chief Medical Director of the medical facility is Dr. Olatunde Bakare who was appointed by Governor Babajide Sanwolu in 2025.

== See also ==
- List of hospitals in Lagos
