= Eko FM =

- Lagos; Nigeria
- Frequency: 89.7 MHz

Ownership
- Sister stations: Radio Lagos

History
- First air date: 1997

Links
- Website: ekofm.lagosstate.gov.ng

Eko FM was established in 1997 as the sister station of Radio Lagos.

EkoFM was created to provide information to Yoruba people.

Many Lagosians rely on this channel to keep them updated, as it broadcasts in both English and local languages.

The government's reach is enormous, and critical messages are sent to the public.

The current General Manager of Eko FM 89.7 is Mr. Olajide Isiaka Lawal.
