= Victoria Island, Lagos =

Former island of Lagos island

Coordinates: 6°25′50″N 3°25′20″E

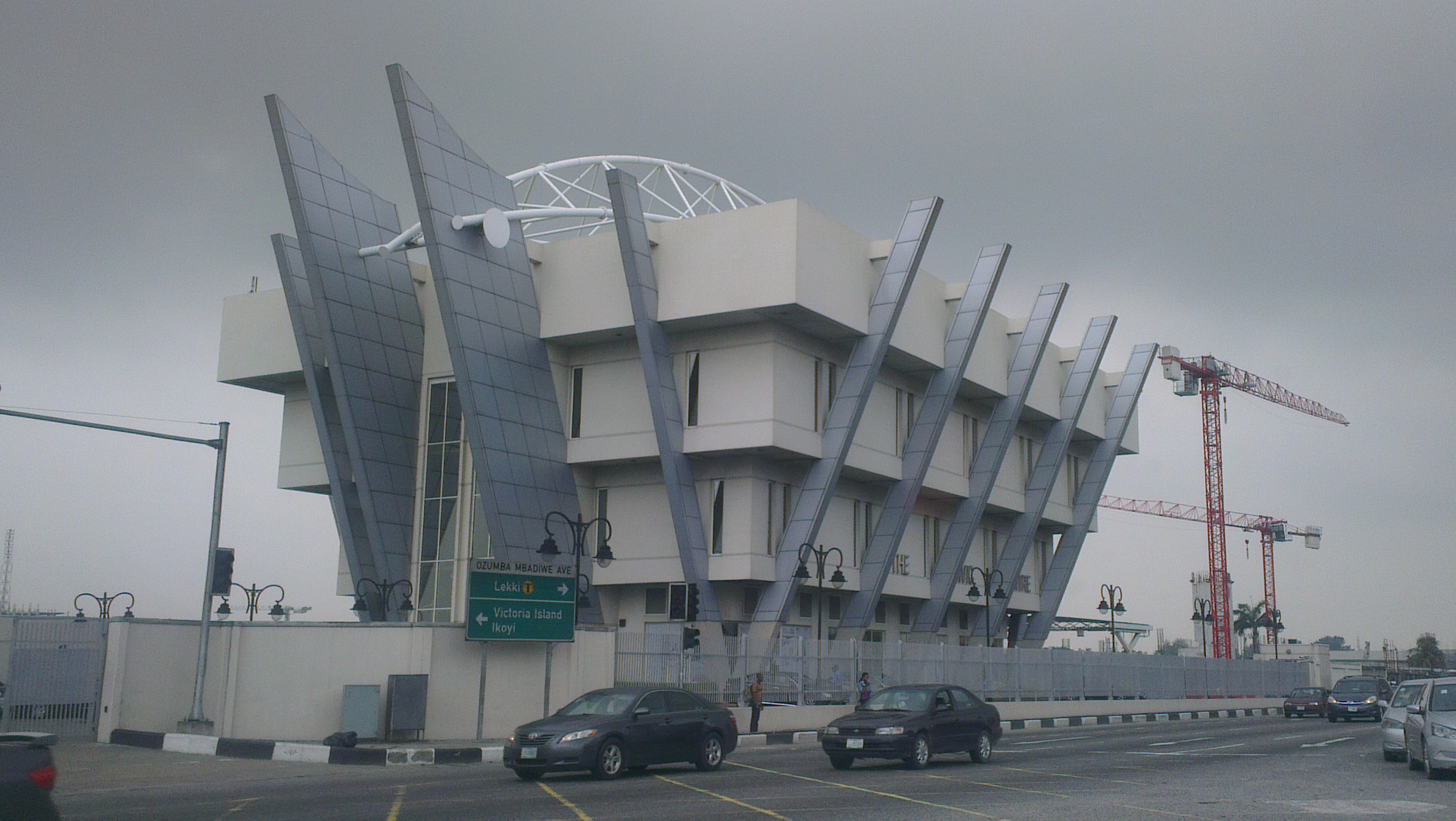
Civic Centre, Victoria Island

Victoria Island (VI) is an affluent area that encompasses a former island of the same name neighbouring Lagos Island, Ikoyi and the Lekki Peninsula by the Lagos Lagoon. It is the main business and financial centre of Lagos State, Nigeria.

The island is one of the most exclusive and expensive areas to reside in Lagos. The town and island lie within the boundaries of the Eti-Osa Local Government Area (LGA). It is named after Queen Victoria.

== History ==
A large part of the Island was originally part of jurisdiction of the Oniru chieftaincy family of Lagos with tenants inhabiting the land. In 1948, the Lagos Executive Development Board paid 250,000 pounds as compensation for the land acquired from the Oniru family and an additional 150,000 pounds as compensation for the inhabitants and the shrines destroyed. The inhabitants were later resettled at Maroko village. Victoria Island was originally surrounded entirely by water. It was bordered by the Atlantic Ocean on the south, the mouth of the Lagos Lagoon on the West, the Five Cowrie Creek to the North, and swamps on the East. The colonial government began the process of filling in the eastern swamps to reduce mosquito breeding areas. This created a land bridge between Victoria Island and Lekki Peninsula ending its existence as a true island.

After independence, successive state governments expanded this development, culminating in the construction of a highway connecting Victoria Island to Epe. This activity, along with the rapid commercialization of Victoria Island, served to stimulate residential development along the Lekki-Epe corridor, starting with Lekki Phase 1. The area of the land bridge, composed of the former swampland, became a large slum called Maroko Town which housed many of the new migrants to Lagos State. Residents of the Island complained about this problem, leading the military Governor of the State, Raji Rasaki, to forcibly remove the residents on 14 July 1990, resulting in numerous injuries. Governor Rasaki and his armed security forces caused the eviction of as many as 300,000 residents, some of whom had legal title to their property.

This new area established after the evictions was called Victoria Island Annex. It was cleared and sold to residential buyers.

Subsequent reclamation expanded the area to the extent that Victoria Island Annex is now connected to the Lekki Peninsula. This new, enlarged area is referred to as "Oniru Estate" after the ruling family of the area.

Originally designated an upscale residential area, failing infrastructure and overcrowding in the old business district on Lagos Island and lax zoning enforcement in Victoria Island led to a mass migration of businesses over the last twenty-five years. Today, Victoria Island is one of Nigeria's busiest centres of banking and commerce, with most major Nigerian and international corporations headquartered on the Island.

The Island has continued to rapidly develop and along with Ikoyi, is a favourite spot for Nigerians and foreigners to live and play.

However, the influx of banks and other commercial ventures has changed the formerly serene atmosphere of the Island. Longtime residents complain about the increase in traffic and influx of street traders who cater to local bank employees and businessmen.

A new project being developed by the Chagoury Group includes the Eko Atlantic City, located next to Victoria Island. The project is being built on reclaimed land that has been lost to coastal erosion.

=== Maroko Town demolition ===
The displaced former residents of Maroko Town have pursued redress within the Nigerian justice system, without success. In 2008, a human rights organization, Social and Economic Rights Action Centre (SERAC), filed a complaint with the African Commission on Human and Peoples' Rights on behalf of the Moroko people.

Activists and displaced Maroko residents continue to hold Maroko Remembrance Day each year on 14 July.

== Economy ==
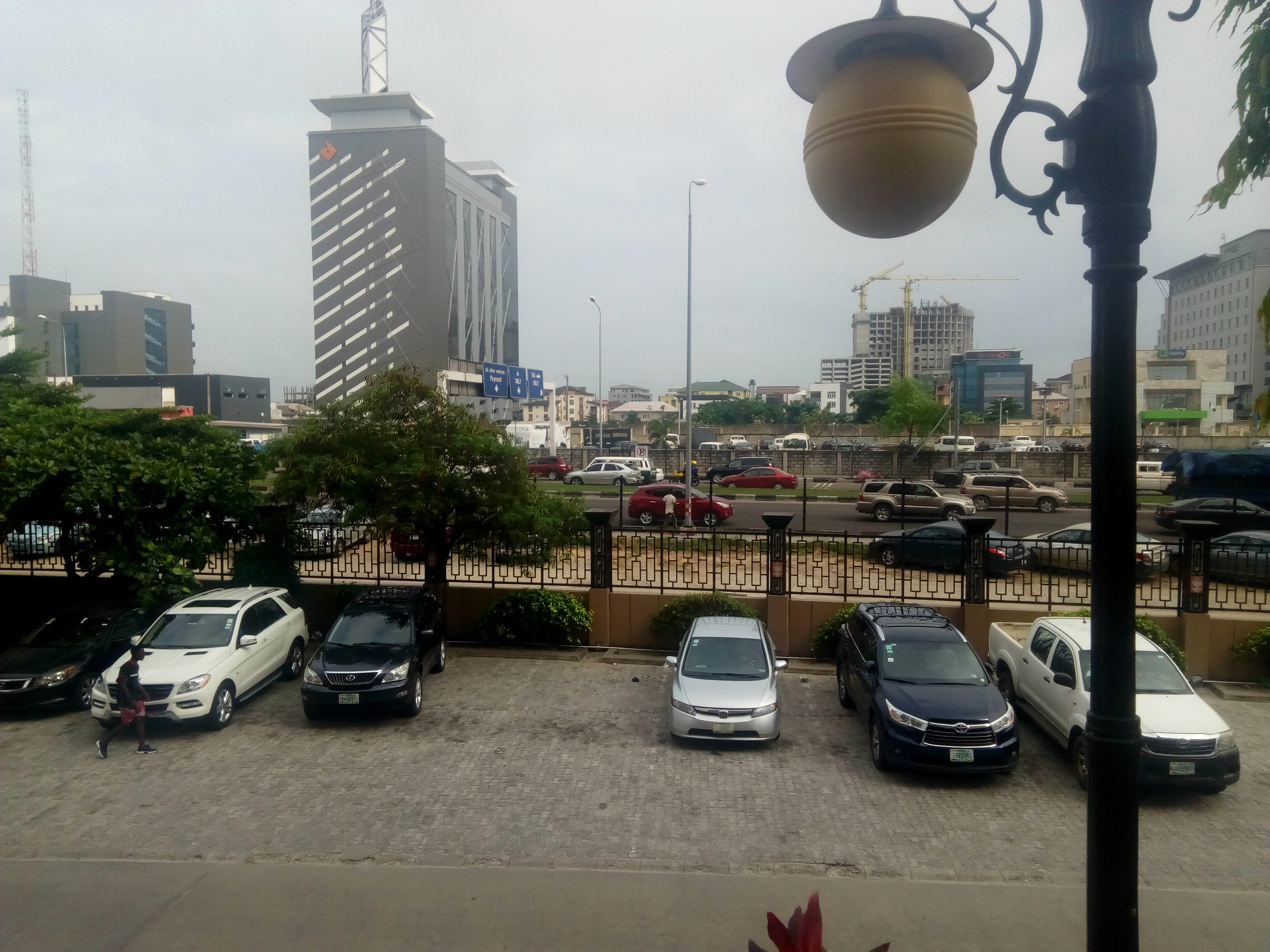
The Access Bank tower, Victoria Island

Guaranty Trust Bank and Access Bank plc have their headquarters on the island, Halliburton and IBM operate offices on Victoria Island.

== Tourism ==
=== Nightclubs, Night life ===
Akin Adesola Street and the Adeola Odeku Street that runs into it on Victoria Island are the hot spot in terms of Lagos' better nightclubs. Travel vlogger Drew Binsky raves about the city's vibrant nightlife with its "swanky bars, rowdy clubs, prostitution, chill lounges and beach parties."

=== Adventure park, amusement centre ===
The Silverbird Galleria is a shopping and entertainment centre on upmarket Victoria Island. It is part of the Silverbird cinema chain and should not be confused with the cinemas of the same name in other parts of Lagos.

== Hospitals ==
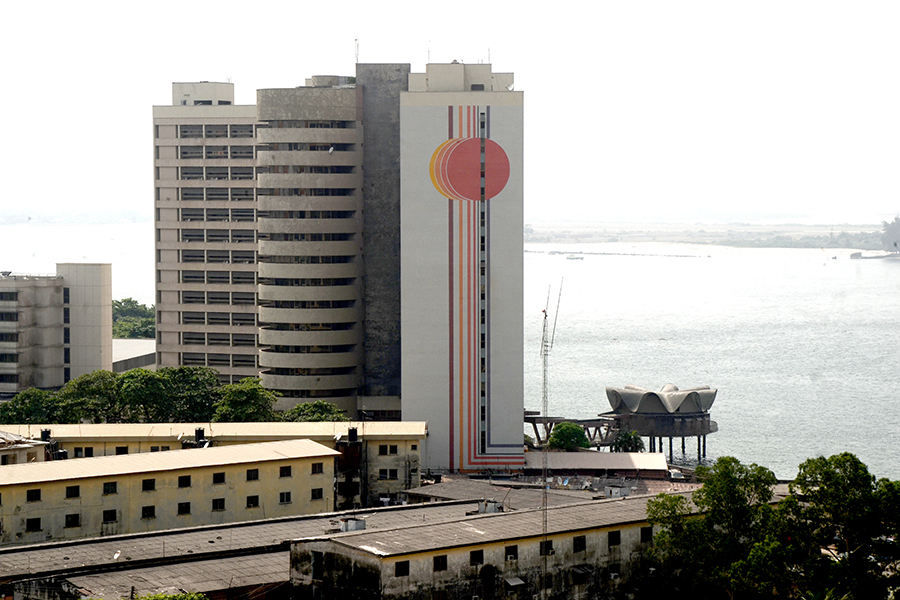
EKO Hospital

- EKO Hospital, private, international standard, training hospital, leading in cardiology,
- Reddington Hospital, international standard, specialised hospital, accredited by COHSASA,
- Euracare Multi-Specialist Hospital, "best urology clinic in Nigeria",
- Paelon Memorial Hospital, 5-star SafeCare award for quality.

== Diplomatic missions ==
Victoria Island hosts most of the diplomatic presence in Lagos, many of which were previously the embassies to Nigeria prior to the move of the capital to Abuja. The now consulates, embassy branch offices, or Deputy High Commissions on Victoria Island include Benin, Brazil, Canada, China, Germany, Guinea, India, Indonesia, Italy, Lebanon, the Netherlands, Russia, South Africa, the United Kingdom, and the United States.

== Education ==
The British International School Lagos and the Lycée Français Louis Pasteur de Lagos are on Victoria Island. Also located on Victoria Island is the American International School of Lagos.

== Famous residents ==
- Kehinde Wiley
