= Citizen Ikenna Samuelson Iwuoha =

Nigerian human rights activist and businessman

- Born: Nkwerre, Imo State, Nigeria
- Occupations: Activist; Businessperson

Ikenna Samuelson Iwuoha is a social crusader and advocate of good governance, transparency and accountability in Nigeria based in Owerri, Imo State. He is known for his stance on integrity.

== Biography ==
Iwuoha was born in Nkwerre, Imo State of Nigeria. He attended Uzii Layout Primary School and Government Secondary School in Owerri, Imo State. He obtained a degree in business management from the Imo State University. He became a public figure in 2010 when he alleged that a serving governor of Imo State personally flogged him in Government House, the seat of power, and subsequently became one of those who fought to ensure that the governor did not have his second term in office.

== Career ==
He worked as a senior special assistant on media and senior special assistant on special duties to the Speaker of Imo State House of Assembly from 2011 to 2013. He was a trader and businessman before his appointment. He founded Ikenna Samuelson Organizations, a conglomerate of companies on the 15th of June 1988. He owns Aboki Holdings and Nwachinemerem Stores, all in Owerri-Imo State, Nigeria. Iwuoha has more than 5800 published articles to his credit since 2007.

== Arrest and detention ==
In 2010 an Owerri Chief Magistrate Court sentenced Iwuoha to three months imprisonment for contempt of court, a judgment he appealed alleging government frame up. He won his appeal and was released after spending 31 days in jail. In 2011 he was made senior special assistant to the Speaker of the Imo State House of Assembly, but in 2013, things fell apart between them and he resigned his appointment. Months later, he was framed and sent to prison where he spent 328 days without trial while his wife spent 186 days in jail before the case was quashed on April 27, 2015 with the assistance of human rights activists Emeka Ononammadu, Kenneth Uwadi and Barrister Louis M. Alozie at high Court 4 in Owerri where Justice Irene Duruoha Igwe presided.
