= Ikenna Azuike =

Nigerian-British lawyer-turned broadcaster

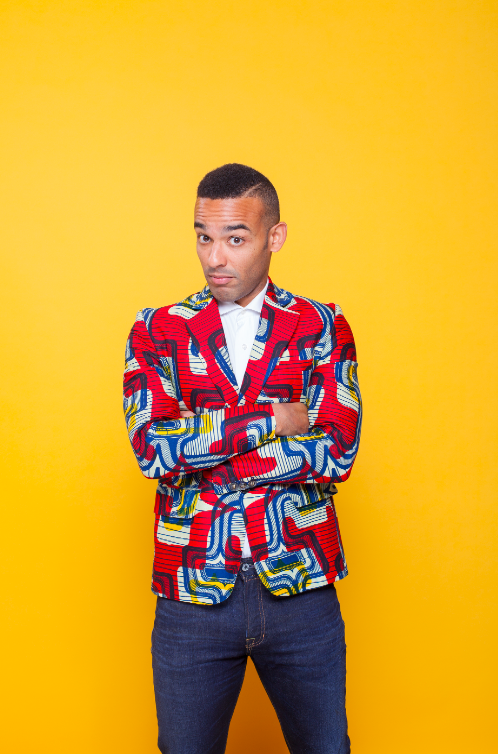
- Born: 8 July 1979 (age 46); Surulere, Lagos, Nigeria
- Occupation: Broadcaster

Ikenna Azuike (born 8 July 1979) is a Nigerian-British lawyer-turned broadcaster, best known for presenting the satirical and pop-culture show, What’s Up Africa.

In 2014, Azuike was cited as one of the "100 Most Influential Africans" by New African magazine

== Early life ==
Azuike was born in Surulere, Lagos, Nigeria. His mother is half German and half Ukrainian and his father Nigerian. He moved to the UK with his parents when he was 8 years old. He currently resides in Amsterdam, Netherlands with his Dutch girlfriend and two children.

== Career ==
Azuike studied law with French Law at University College, London, and obtained his LPC at the University of Nottingham in 2002.

He began his career as a lawyer for Shearman & Sterling LLP in London and Singapore, then Clifford Chance LLP in Amsterdam and in 2007 moved to the United States to return to work for Shearman & Sterling LLP in New York.

In 2008, Azuike moved back to the Netherlands from New York with his girlfriend Mette te Velde to co-found the Strawberry Earth foundation; a blog, store, events and PR company linking sustainable businesses and initiatives with young and influential creatives all over the world.

Azuike also joined Radio Netherlands Worldwide in 2008 as a trainee, part-time radio journalist, cutting his teeth on a daily news programme and subsequently a weekly magazine programme called Bridges With Africa. Frustrated by what he felt was the unbalanced and often “inaccurate portrayal of Africa in Western media”, Azuike persuaded RNW to let him create a satirical video blog about African news, views and people, a concept inspired by US satirical news shows such as The Daily Show with Jon Stewart. What’s Up Africa was the result - a YouTube video blog launched by Azuike in conjunction with RNW in March 2011 covering African news and political satire.

In 2013, Azuike was invited to speak at a variety of TEDx events, the first was TEDxLuanda, based in Angola. Another TEDx events, include TEDxEuston, where he spoke on the same stage as the Nigerian Finance Minister, Ngozi Okonjo-Iweala. In 2014, Azuike was also invited to host the live TEDxHague Academy event at the Peace Palace in The Hague.

In January 2012, Azuike was recognised by TheRoot.com as one of the top 25 bloggers to watch. And he was also cited as one of the 100 Most Influential Africans 2014 by New African magazine

From January 2015, What’s Up Africa will be incorporated as a weekly segment within the BBC World News television show, Focus on Africa.

In July 2019, his Dutch programme “Planeet Nigeria” started on the Dutch public broadcaster, in which he tries to understand his country of birth.

In October 2024, a new Dutch programme "De Afro-Europeaan" aired on the Dutch public broadcaster. In this series Azuike visits different African communities in search of advice. The programme brings him to Somalian Fins, Cape Verdian Portuguese and Congolese Belgiums.
