= Badagry General Hospital =

Hospital in Lagos State, Nigeria

Coordinates: 6.61512°N 3.53923°E

Badagry General Hospital is a public healthcare facility located in Badagry, Lagos State, Nigeria. It provides a range of medical services to the residents of Badagry and its neighboring communities. The hospital operates under the Lagos State Ministry of Health
