= Ifako-Ijaiye General Hospital =

General Hospital in Lagos State, Nigeria

Ifako-Ijaiye General Hospital is a public healthcare facility located at 14 College Road, off Iju Road, in the Ifako-Ijaiye Local Government Area of Lagos State, Nigeria. It serves the medical needs of residents in Ifako-Ijaiye and neighboring communities.

== Governance ==
As a public institution, the hospital operates under the Lagos State Ministry of Health, ensuring compliance with state healthcare regulations and standards.

== Department ==
- Laboratory
- Medicine
- Obstetrics and Gynaecology
- Paediatrics
- Pharmacy
- Radiology (USS)
- Surgery.
