= Isolo General Hospital =

Geography
- Location: Lagos state, Nigeria
- Coordinates: 6.526666111721282°N 3.318158745240363°E

Organisation
- Type: General

Links
- Lists: Hospitals in Nigeria

Isolo General Hospital is a public healthcare facility located in Isolo, Lagos, Nigeria. It provides medical services to residents of Isolo and surrounding areas, offering a range of healthcare services, including emergency care, maternity services, outpatient consultations, and specialized treatments. The hospital is managed by the Lagos State Government as part of its public health system, ensuring affordable and accessible medical care for the community.

== Psychiatric ward ==
Isolo General Hospital has a 10-bed psychiatric ward to address the shortage of admission spaces for mental health patients. The initiative aims to provide affordable psychiatric care, easing the financial burden on families.

The facility complements existing services at Lagos State University Teaching Hospital (LASUTH) and the Federal Neuropsychiatric Hospital in Yaba.
