= Maroko, Lagos =

Community in Eti-Osa, Lagos State, Nigeria

Maroko was a community in Eti-Osa, Lagos State, Nigeria. It was adjacent to Ikoyi and east of Victoria Island. It was a low-income area that attracted a lot of migrants since it was in close proximity to economically robust areas. Flooding and sand-filling affected Maroko during its life.

== Demolition ==
In July 1990, Maroko settlement was made up of Ijaw and Ilaje people amongst other yorubas. The Lagos State government, under civilian governor Alhaji Lateef Jakande attempted the first eviction of the settlement in 1980, which led to riots where government workers lost their lives. The military administrator Raji Rasaki, evicted the residents of Maroko and demolished the community. The government said that Maroko was below sea level and needed to be filled in with sand and that Maroko needed infrastructure improvements. About 300,000 people lost their houses. It was one of the largest forced evictions in Nigerian history.

The former residents tried to get compensation in the Nigerian court system. In December 2008, the Social and Economic Rights Action Centre (SERAC) and Debevoise & Plimpton, filed a communication with the African Commission on Human and Peoples' Rights, stating that the eviction violated the African Charter on Human and Peoples' Rights.

== In media ==
The Beatification of Area Boy (1995), a play written by Wole Soyinka, has its plot woven around the infamous eviction of Maroko residents.

Maroko is a setting in the book Graceland (2004) by Chris Abani.
