= Randle General Hospital =

Hospital in Surulere, Lagos, Nigeria

Coordinates: 6.5084°N 3.3572°E

Geography
- Location: 28 Benson St, Surulere, Lagos 101241, Lagos, Lagos, Nigeria

Organisation
- Care system: Public hospital

Links
- Lists: Hospitals in Nigeria

Randle General Hospital is a state general hospital in the Surulere district of Lagos, Nigeria. It was established for community use in 1964 by Chief Majekodunmi and it was one of the first health care clinics in Surulere.

The hospital is extremely busy, particularly in the accident and emergency department.

== Establishment purpose ==
This hospital was established to offer maternal and child health care, dental services, medical and surgical services etc. It is sometimes referred to as the Surulere General Hospital. The medical director of the hospital is Dr. Aduke Odutayo.

The hospital recorded a total of 6929 patients visiting the dental section for the period of January to December in the year 2020. Randle General Hospital is presently undergoing renovations and reconstruction, a project initiated by the CHief of Staff to the President, Rt Honourable Femi Gbajabiamila

== Free medical/legal Support ==
The General Hospital in Surulere is committed to aiding survivors of sexual and gender-based violence (SGBV) by offering complimentary medical services and legal support to those who are sexual molested in public with proper legal action.
