= Radio Lagos =

- Lagos; Nigeria
- Broadcast area: Lagos State
- Frequency: 107.5 MHz

Programming
- Languages: Mixed indigenous and English

Ownership
- Owner: Lagos State Radio Corporation

Technical information
- Transmitter coordinates: 6°37′10.767″N 3°21′12.719″E

Radio Lagos 107.5 FM (also known as Tiwa n' Tiwa) began operations in 1977 as an offshoot of the Nigerian Broadcasting Corporation (NBC). It is the first state-owned FM radio station in Lagos State.

The station originally operated on two A.M. Frequencies (990 kHz.303mtrs and 918 kHz.327mtrs). The need for transformation produced Radio Lagos 107.5 FM (Tiwa n'Tiwa) under the control of the Lagos State Radio Service in 2001.

Radio Lagos is the first predominantly specialized language station, with over 98% of its transmission in Yoruba and Egun, and approximately 2% for English bulletins. The station's target audience includes Yoruba speaking listeners in Lagos and the Nigerian diaspora.

The appointment of Mr. Olajide Isiaka Lawal as General Manager of Radio Lagos has been authorized by Lagos State Governor, Mr. Babajide Sanwo-Olu.

== See also ==
- List of radio stations in Lagos
- Lagos Television
- EKo FM
