= Surulere =

- LGA; Settlement
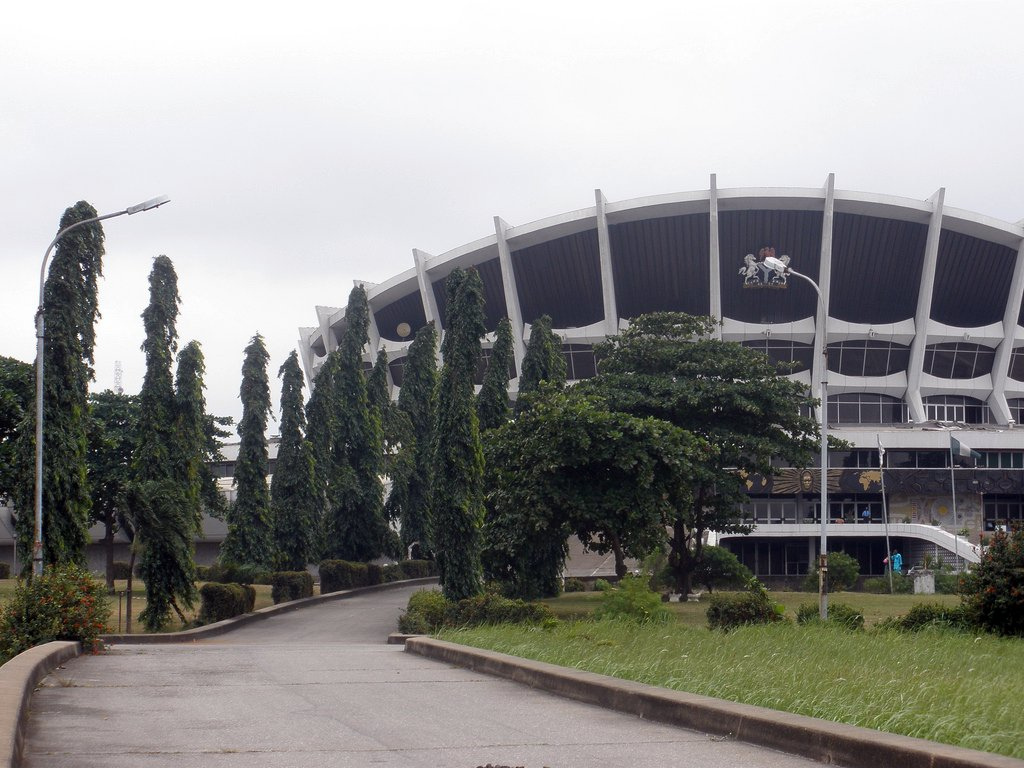
- The National Arts Theatre, a Landmark in Surulere.
- Interactive map of Surulere
- Surulere shown within Nigeria
- Coordinates: 6°30′0″N 3°21′0″E
- Country: Nigeria
- State: Lagos State
- Metropolitan Area: Lagos

Area
  - Total: 23 km^{2} (8.9 sq mi)

Population (2022)
  - Total: 744,400
  - Density: 32,000/km^{2} (84,000/sq mi)
- Time zone: UTC+1 (CET/WAT)
- Postal code: 101283

Surulere is a city and local government area located on the mainland in Lagos State, Nigeria. It has an area of 23 km^{2} (8.9 sq mi). At the 2006 census, there were 503,975 inhabitants, with a population density of 21,864 inhabitants per square kilometer. The local government area is bordered by Yaba, Mushin, and Ebute-Metta.

== History ==
During the rapid urbanization of Lagos, the city expanded to the west of its lagoon, which included present-day Surulere. Families from different regions of the country have historically settled in Surulere. In addition to the local settlers of Lagos, during the nineteenth century, various emancipated African Brazilians and Cubans, who were referred to as Aguda or Saros, settled in Surulere. Nigerians from the Northern region initially ended at Idi-Araba, while many people from the eastern part were in various quarters but predominantly at Obele, Ikate, and Aguda areas. Residents of Lagos Island who bought or leased land from the government and Aworis settled in New Lagos. In contrast, others lived in the neighborhoods of Itire, Lawanson, Ojuelegba, Animashaun, and Shitta. The New Lagos neighborhood, also known as the Surulere Re-Housing Estate, is among the first public housing projects in Nigeria. Itire, one of the quarters in Surulere, has a recognized traditional authority in the Onitire of Itire.

== Industry ==
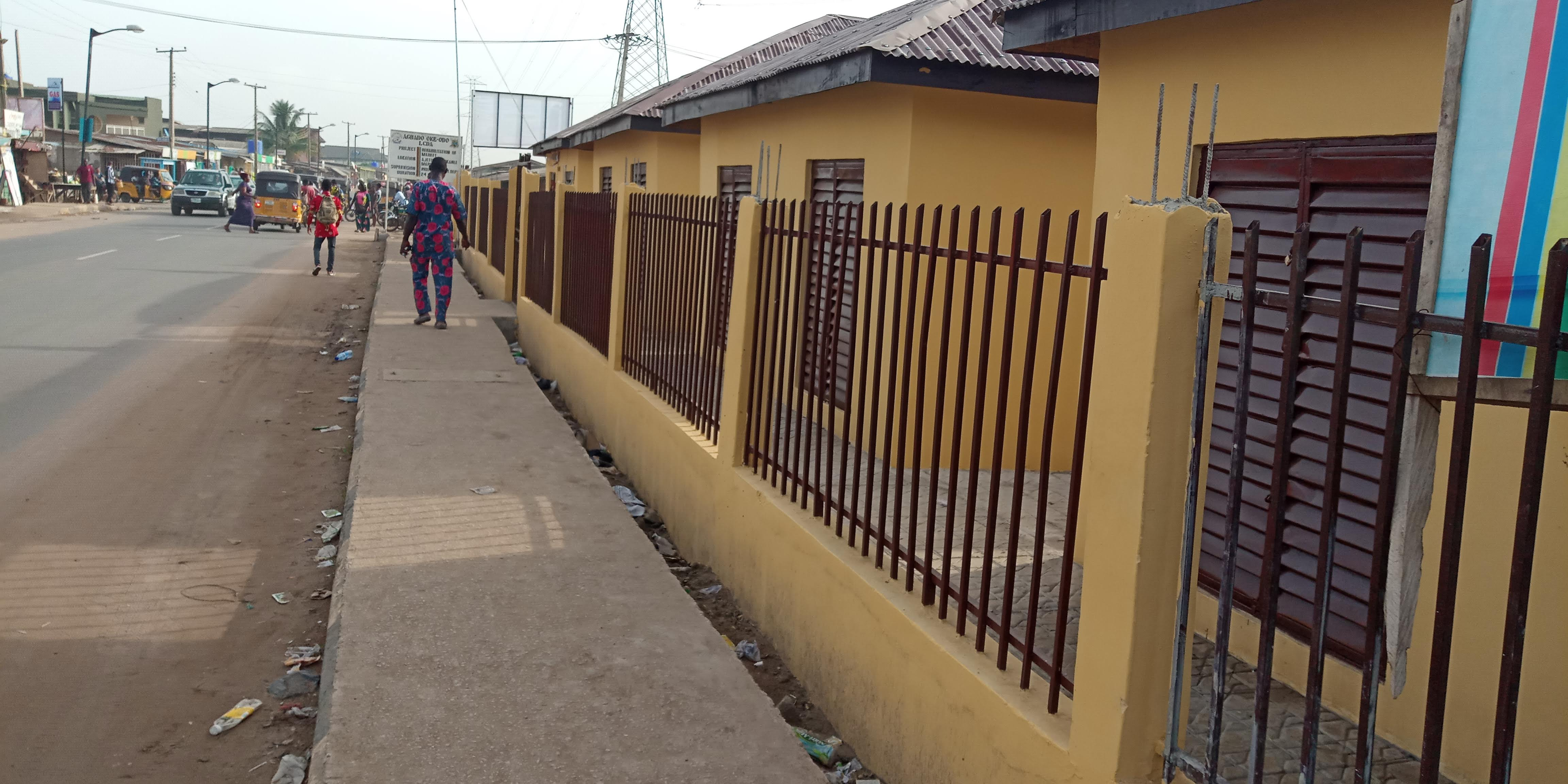
Amikanle Market, Surulere community

=== Emergence ===
In 1977, Surulere was the host location of a cultural festival, FESTAC 77, also known as the Second World Black and African Festival of Arts and Culture. The event held between 15 January 1977 and 12 February 1977. Surulere is home to the 55,000-spectator capacity Lagos National Stadium built in 1972 for the 1973 All-Africa Games, now abandoned and dilapidated.. However, in preparation for the 2009 Under 17 FIFA World Cup the facilities were improved, and the event kicked off successfully in October 2009. Surulere also houses the Teslim Balogun Stadium, a multi-use stadium with capacity in excess of 24,000 where mainly football matches are staged. The main commercial streets in Surulere are Western Avenue, Adeniran Ogunsanya, Adelabu, Ogunalana Drive, and Aguda, while various open markets are dispersed in different neighborhoods. Industrial establishments are predominantly located at Iponri, Coker, and Iganmu.

== Landmarks and places ==
- National Stadium Lagos
- National Arts Theatre
- Adeniran Ogunsanya Street, Lagos
- Teslim Balogun Stadium
- Ojuelegba
- Nigeria Internet Registration Association (NIRA)
- Ansar Ud Deen
- Randle General Hospital
- Nigerian Breweries
- Vivian Fowler
- Eko Bridge
- Birch Freeman High School
- Bode Thomas Street

== Notable people ==
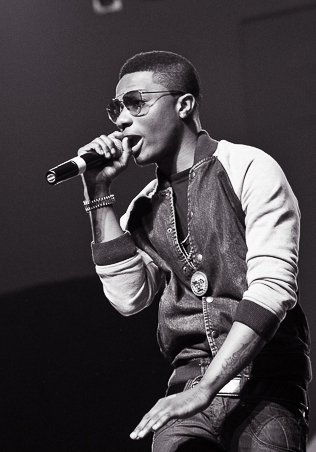
Ayodeji Balogun, Wizkid.

- Wizkid, music recording artist
- Waidi Akanni, footballer and executive
- Babatunde Fashola, politician and former governor of Lagos State
- Teslim Fatusi, footballer
- Ade Olufeko, technologist and entrepreneur
- Desmond Elliot, actor and politician
- Ramsey Nouah, film actor
- Bankulli, singer and songwriter
- Folashade Sherifat Jaji, chemist and civil servant
- Tade Ogidan, film and television director
- Damilola Adegbite, actress and television personality
- Aliko Dangote, billionaire
- Linda Ejiofor, television actress
- Tana Adelana, Nollywood actress
- Rilwan Akiolu, traditional Oba
- Bose Kaffo, professional table tennis player
- Femi Gbajabiamila, lawyer and politician
- S.B. Bakare, stevedore businessman
- Bukky Ajayi, film actress
- Ikenna Azuike, lawyer and broadcaster.
- Simi, soul singer and song writer.
- Samuel Okwaraji, footballer
- Lanre Tejuosho, politician
- Hakeem Olajuwon, professional basketball player champion.
- Pepenazi, recording artist
- OJB Jezreel †, singer-songwriter and record producer.
- Nneka Isaac Moses, Actress and fashion designer
- Tayo Aderinokun, bank executive.
- Henry Dele Alake, journalist, activist and technocrat
- Ken Nwadiogbu, visual artist
- Seyi Sodimu, Singer songwriter
- Victor Olaiya, musician
- Adewale Maja-Pearce, writer
- A. Igoni Barrett, writer
- Gbemi Olateru Olagbegi, broadcaster
- Mojisolaoluwa Alli Macaulay, politician
- Raphael Akpejiori, professional boxer
- Kemi Badenoch, politician

== Gallery ==
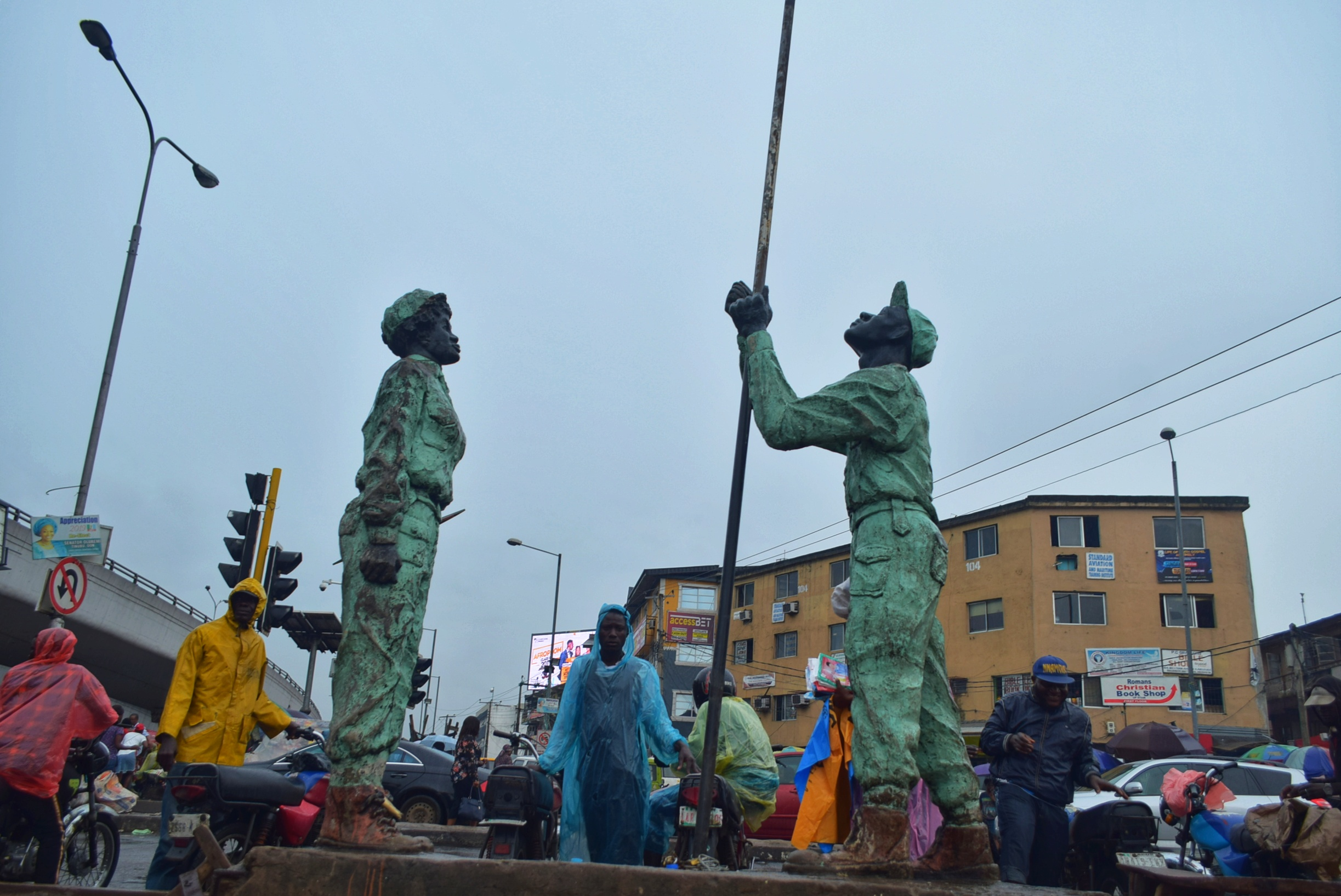
Statue in hommage of NYSC

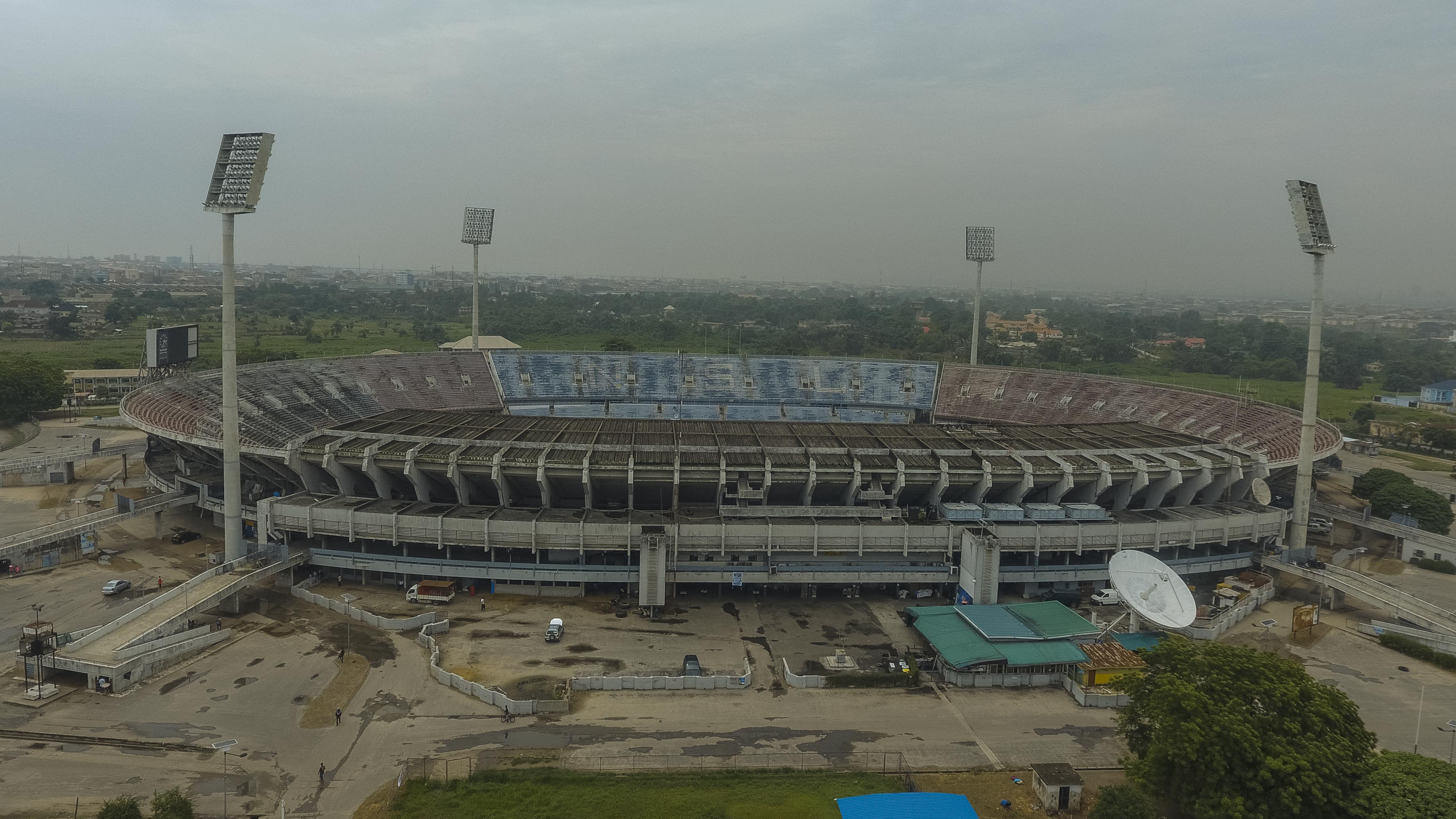
Lagos National Stadium

== See also ==
- Ojuelegba
- Ikeja
- Yaba
