= James Odedeji =

Anglican bishop in Nigeria

James Olusola Odedeji is an Anglican bishop in Nigeria.

Odedeji was born in 1969 in Osun State. He was educated at Lagos State University; and ordained deacon in 1993, priest in 1994. After a curacy at Archbishop Vining Memorial Church, Ikeja he served incumbencies at Isheri, Akesan and Oshodi as the Vicar. He also served as Curate from 1997 to 2003 at Archbishop Vining Memorial Church which later became the cathedral. He became a Canon in 2003; an Archdeacon in 2007, Dean in 2010 and Bishop of Lagos West in 2013.
