= Jadesola =

Jádesọ́lá is a female Yoruba people given name and also a family name, meaning "emerge into wealth." Notable people with the given name include:

- Jadesola Osiberu (born 1985), Nigerian writer
- Jadesola Akande (1940–2008), Nigerian lawyer
