= Oghene =

Oghene may refer to:

- Princess Oghene, Nigerian entrepreneur and fashion executive
- Oghene Egoh (born 1955), Nigerian politician
