= Ben Nwoye =

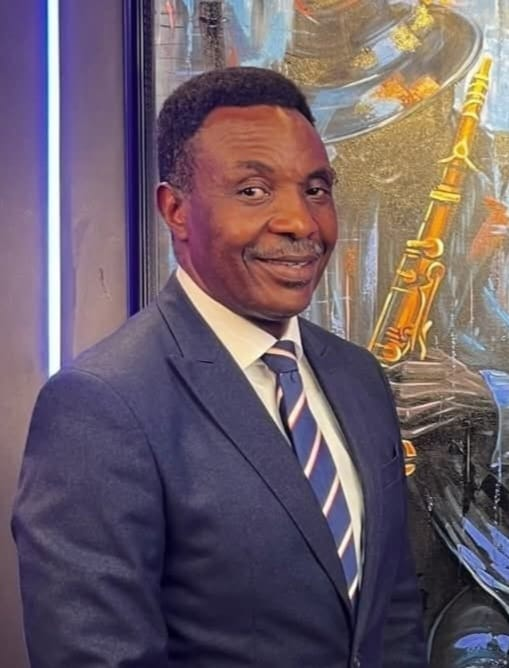

Deputy National Chairman (South) of the All Progressives Congress
- Incumbent
- Assumed office 29 March 2026

Personal details
- Born: Benjamin Obi Nwoye; 28 May 1964 (age 62) Amurri, Enugu State, Nigeria
- Party: All Progressives Congress
- Education: University of Illinois Chicago
- Occupation: Lawyer, politician, corporate executive

Dr. Benjamin Obi Nwoye (born 28 May 1964) is a Nigerian lawyer, politician, and corporate executive from Amurri in Nkanu West Local Government Area of Enugu State, Nigeria. He has been involved in legal practice, business administration, and party politics in Nigeria since 2001. He previously served as a commissioner for the Federal Competition and Consumer Protection Commission (FCCPC) from 2021 to 2024 and represented the South-East geopolitical zone.

== Political career ==
He served as the chairman of the All Progressives Congress (APC) in Enugu State from 2014 to 2021. During this time, he was involved in party administration and political activities within the state chapter of the party. He then later served as chief of staff to the Deputy National Chairman (North) of the APC from 2024 to 2025. Nwoye has also served as chairman of the APC Caretaker Committee in Enugu State. But in April 2025, he resigned from the APC, citing internal political disagreements.

On the 29th of March, 2026, he was elected as the Deputy National Chairman South of the All Progressives Congress APC at Abuja, during the convention of the party.

== Legal career ==
Outside politics, Nwoye has been involved in legal practice and corporate management. He was a co-founder of Mendoza and Nwoye PLC, a law firm based in Chicago, United States. He also served as an executive director of Opeans Nigeria Ltd, an industrial company based in Port Harcourt.

He holds a Juris Doctor (J.D.) degree from the University of Illinois Chicago School of Law and a Bachelor of Arts in Criminal Justice Administration from the University of Illinois Chicago. He has also served as a visiting lecturer at the Institute for Peace, Conflict, and Development Studies at Enugu State University of Science and Technology.
