= Tunji Bello =

Nigerian lawyer and environmentalist

Olatunji Bello
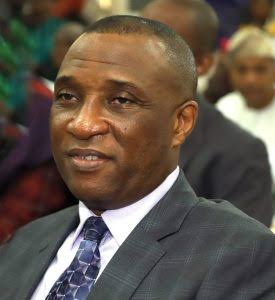

Lagos State Commissioner of Environment
- In office 20 August 2019 – May 2023
- Appointed by: Babajide Sanwoolu
- Succeeded by: Tokumbo Wahab

Personal details
- Born: 1 July 1961 (age 64) Lagos, Nigeria
- Spouse: Ibiyemi Olatunji-Bello
- Awards: Alfred Friendly Press Fellowship, United States

Olatunji Bello (born 1 July 1961) is a Nigerian lawyer, environmentalist, political scientist and journalist who served as Commissioner for Environment and Water Resources under the Babajide Sanwo-Olu administration in Lagos State from 2019 to 2023 and is the present Chief Executive Officer /Executive vice chairman of the FCCPC (Federal Competition and Consumer Protection Commission) since June 2024.^{[6]}

== Educational background ==
He has a BSc degree in political science from the University of Ibadan, graduating in 1984. He earned a master's degree in International Law and Diplomacy (ML.D) in 1987 and a Bachelor of Law (LLB) degree in 2000 from the University of Lagos. Bello is a barrister at law (BL), qualifying from the Nigerian Law School, Lagos, in 2001.

== Media career ==
Bello started his media career at the defunct Concord Press of Nigeria, where he rose to the position of editor. He started out as a features writer and also an assistant features editor. His career in journalism grew so quickly that he became a politics editor at the age of 27. He was later promoted to the editor of the Sunday title and later editor of the daily title of the Concord Newspapers Group. He was also appointed chairman of the editorial board of This Day Newspaper in 2000. He was a staff writer with St. Petersburg Times, Florida, US, and also the U.S. News & World Report, Washington DC, in 1992.

== Political career ==
As a student at the University of Ibadan, Bello was vice president of the University of Ibadan Students Union. He has always advocated for democracy since the 80s. His mainstream national political career started when he served as the special assistant to MKO Abiola, the winner of the annulled 12 June 1993 presidential election. After the annulment of the epochal election, Bello became a member of the Nigerian pro-democracy group, NADECO, which fought for the actualisation of democracy in Nigeria and was active from 1993 to 1999. After the transition to democratic rule in 1999, Bello joined the administration of the Lagos State governor, Bola Tinubu. He served as the head of the Lagos State Signage and Advertising Agency (LASAA) and, in 2003, as the Commissioner for Environment.

In July 2011, Bello was appointed Commissioner for Environment under Governor Babatunde Fashola's administration, serving until 29 May 2015.

In 2015, following the inauguration of Governor Akinwunmi Ambode, Bello was appointed Secretary to the State Government, serving from 29 May 2015 to 2019.

In 2019, he joined the Babajide Sanwo-Olu administration as Commissioner for Environment and Water Resources, following confirmation by the Lagos State House of Assembly. He held this position until 2023.

In June 2024, Bello was appointed chief executive officer and executive vice-chairman of the Federal Competition and Consumer Protection Commission by President Bola Tinubu.

== Awards ==
He has received several awards, including the Alfred Friendly Press Fellowship in the United States and the Concord Press Award for Excellence and Bravery in Journalism. He also received the Concord Publisher's Best Editorial Manager, the University of Ibadan Distinguished Alumnus Award and the University of Lagos Distinguished Alumni Achievers Award of Excellence. He was honoured by the Nigerian Society of Engineers, Ikeja, Lagos branch, and the United Nations Development Programme (UNDP) for laying the foundation for environmental sustenance in Lagos State. He has authored one book and contributed to four others.

== Personal life ==
Bello is married to Ibiyemi Olatunji-Bello, who has served as the vice-chancellor of Lagos State University since September 2021.
