= Ibiyemi Olatunji-Bello =

Nigerian academic

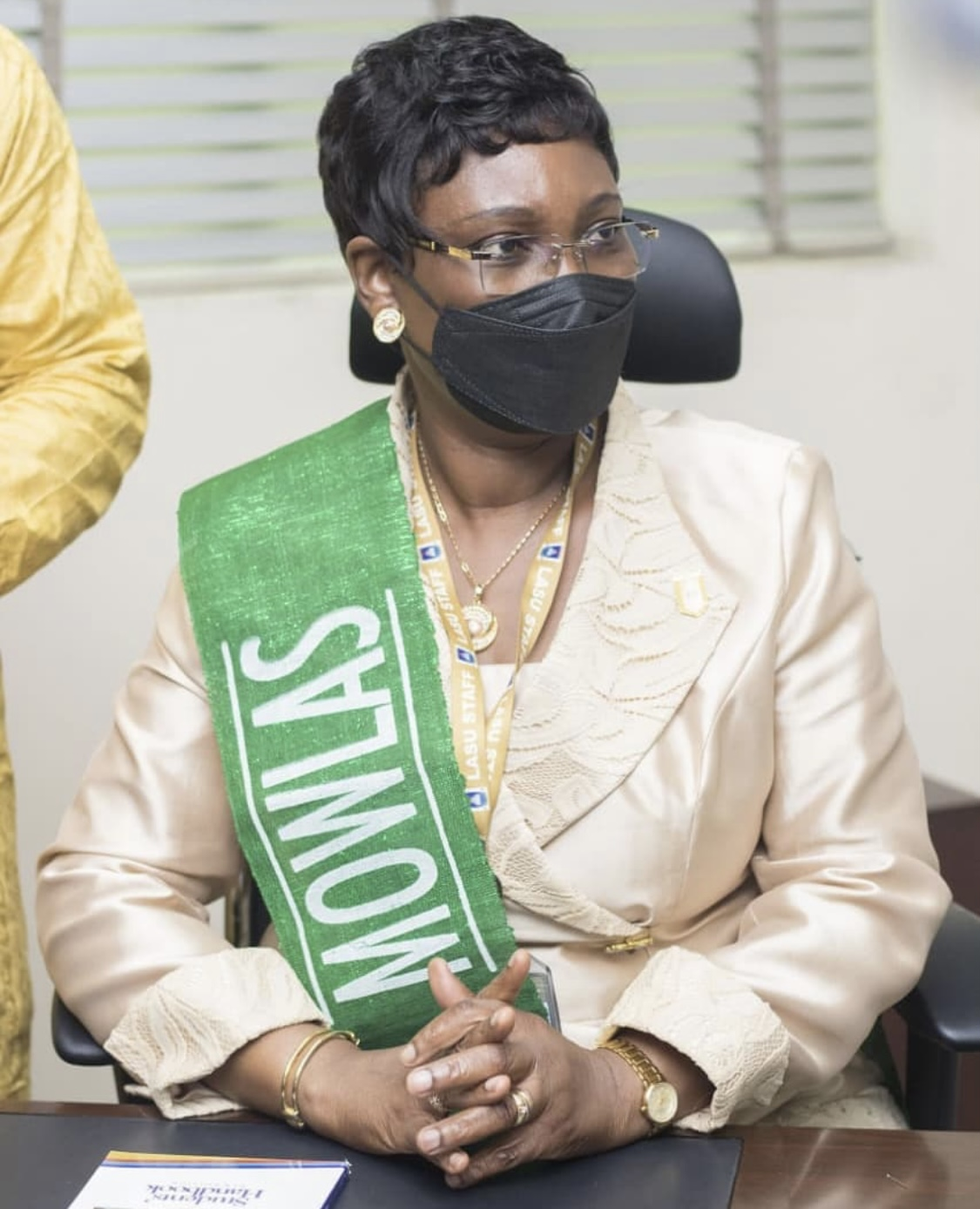

9th Vice-Chancellor of Lagos State University
- In office 16 September 2021 – 19 September 2026
- Appointed by: Babajide Sanwoolu
- Preceded by: Olanrewaju Fagbohun
- Succeeded by: Ayodeji Badejo

Personal details
- Born: 23 April 1964 (age 62) Lagos, Nigeria
- Spouse: Olatunji Bello
- Website: ibiyemiolatunjibello.com

Ibiyemi Olatunji-Bello (born 23 April 1964) is a Nigerian academic. She is a professor of physiology and the 9th Vice-Chancellor of Lagos State University.

== Biography ==
Olatunji-Bello was born in Ologbowo community Idumota, Lagos Island in defunct Western Region of Nigeria on 23 April 1964. She attended Anglican Girl Grammar School in Surulere between 1970 and 1974 and Methodist Girls' High School, Yaba for Junior and Senior secondary education between 1974 and 1979. For tertiary education, she attended Lagos State College of Science and Technology, University of Ibadan where she obtained a bachelor's degree in physiology in 1985. She obtained a master's degree in physiology from the University of Lagos in 1987. She also attended University of Texas at San Antonio, Health Science Centre, San Antonio between 1994 and 1998.

She served as an assistant lecturer at the College of Medicine, University of Lagos and rose through the ranks, eventually becoming a professor of physiology at Lagos State University College of Medicine in 2007. She served as the deputy Vice Chancellor of Lagos State University(LASU) in 2008. She also served as the acting Vice Chancellor of Lagos State University known as LASU before Professor Ibiyemi Olatunji-Bello was appointed as the 9th substantive Vice-Chancellor of the Lagos State University (LASU). In an interview with The Nation, she mentioned that her becoming the vice chancellor was because it was God's appointed time for her.

Mrs Olatunji-Bello married commissioner Bello Olutunji which is a commissioner for environment and water resources in Lagos State, Nigeria. Mrs Bello-Olutunji has three children.

== Awards and recognitions ==
Olatunji-Bello is a recipient of The Feminine Nigerian Achievement Award in the category of The Most Outstanding in Tertiary Education.

Olatunji-Bello is also on the list of "The Nigerian Woman Annual: 100 Leading Woman" for the year 2022.
