= Abisogun Leigh =

Nigerian academic

Chief Abisogun Leigh OFR

5th Vice-Chancellor of Lagos State University
- In office 2001–2005
- Preceded by: Fatiu Ademola Akesode
- Succeeded by: Abdul Lateef A. Hussein

Personal details
- Occupation: Academic

Chief Abisogun Leigh OFR is a Nigerian academic and administrator. He was the Vice-Chancellor of Lagos State University from 2001 to 2005. He succeeded Fatiu Ademola Akesode, who died before the end of his tenure in March 2001; he was appointed by Bola Tinubu.

In addition to a variety of other chieftaincy titles, he currently holds that of the Onipopo of Popo Aguda in Lagos.

== Personal life ==
Leigh loves swimming and is a patron of the Swimming Section of the Lagos Country Club.

== Chieftaincy titles ==
Chief Leigh is the Onipopo of Popo Aguda, a historic community of Yoruba Catholics that claim descent from immigrant freedmen from 19th century Brazil and Cuba. He has held this title since the early 2020s.

He's also the Baajiki of Lagos.
