= Chris Ayebusiwa =

Nigerian politician from Ondo State

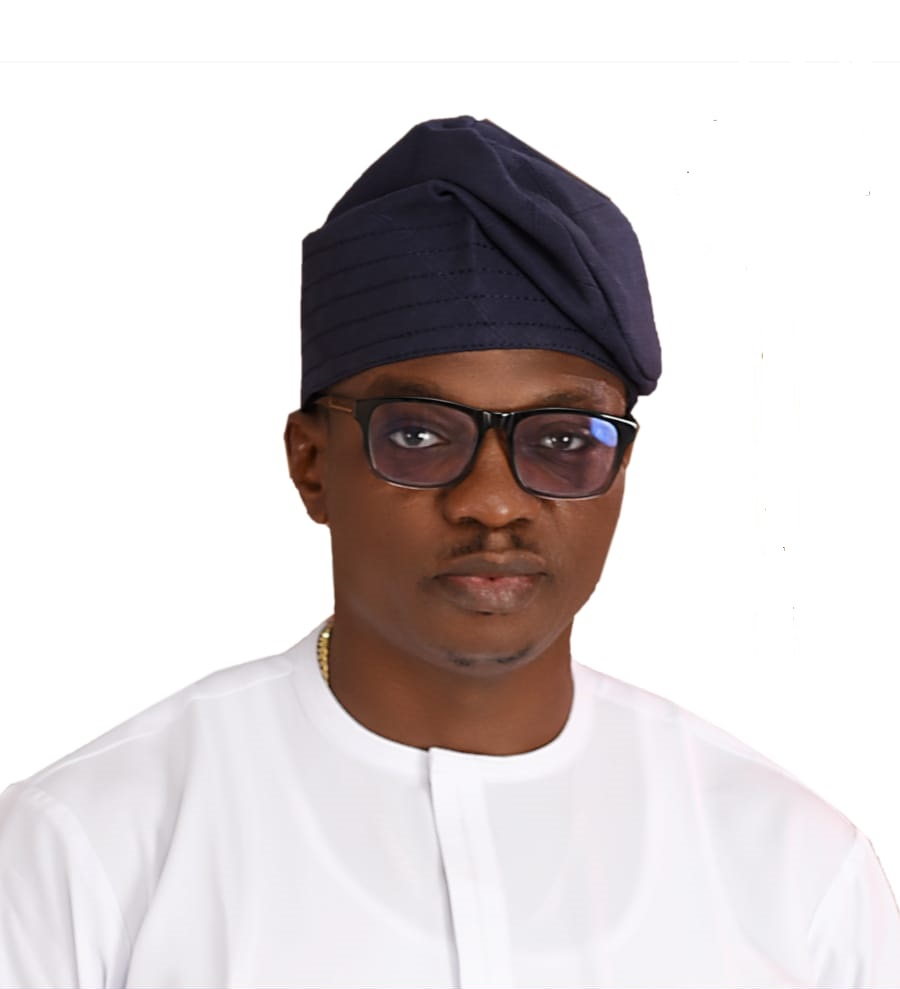

Member Ondo State House of Assembly
- In office 2023–2027
- Preceded by: Akintomide Akinrogunde
- Constituency: Okitipupa Constituency 1

Personal details
- Born: 26 December 1979 (age 46)
- Party: All Progressive Congress (APC)
- Education: Lagos State University
- Occupation: Businessman; politician

Chris Ayebusiwa (born 26 December 1979) is a Nigerian politician and public administrator. He is a member of the Ondo State House of Assembly representing Okitipupa Constituency 1 on the platform of All Progressives Congress (APC).

== Early life and education ==
Chris hails from the Igo-Aduwo quarters of Ilutitun, Morubodo Kingdom, in the present Okitipupa local government area of Ondo State. His parents, Dr Joseph Omotayo Ayebusiwa, and Mrs Mabel Olayinka Ayebusiwa (Nee Ikupolusi) (both deceased). He earned a Bachelor of Science degree in public administration from Lagos State University.

== Politics ==
Chris was elected on the platform of the All Progressives Congress (APC) in March 2023, and inaugurated into the 10th Ondo State House of Assembly in June 2023, after an unsuccessful attempt at the same position in 2015. Among other statutory roles, Chris chairs the House Committee on Tertiary Institutions.

== Awards ==
In 2023, he received the Emerging Leaders Award from the School of Arts and Social Sciences, Adeyemi Federal University of Technology, Ondo State.
