= John Obafunwa =

Nigerian lawyer and academic

7th Vice-Chancellor of Lagos State University
- In office 2011–2015
- Preceded by: Abdul Lateef A. Hussein
- Succeeded by: Olanrewaju Fagbohun

Personal details
- Born: John Oladapo Obafunwa Epe, Lagos State, Nigeria
- Education: University of Lagos; University of Edinburgh Medical School; Royal College of Pathologists; Northumbria University
- Occupation: Medical expert; author; Forensic pathologist
- Website: www.profjohnobafunwa.com

John Obafunwa is a Nigerian medical expert, pathologist, lawyer, author and former Vice-Chancellor of Lagos State University.

== Early life and education ==
Obafunwa was born in Epe, a local government area in Lagos State, South-Western Nigeria. He obtained a bachelor's degree in medicine from the University of Lagos. Prior to obtaining his post graduate certificate from the National Postgraduate Medical College of Nigeria in 1987, he spent five years of residency training the Department of Morbid Anatomy, Lagos University Teaching Hospital. In 1991, he graduated with a Diploma in medical jurisprudence from the University of Edinburgh Medical School, Scotland before he became a member of the Royal College of Pathologists in 1992. He also hold a Bachelor of Laws degree after he graduated from Northumbria University in 2004.

== Career ==
Prior to his appointment as the 7th Vice-Chancellor of Lagos State University, Obafunwa has worked and served in several educational and medical organizations including the Forensic Medicine Unit, University of Edinburgh Medical School and South Tyneside NHS Foundation Trust. He served as Head of Department of the Department of Pathology, Jos University Teaching Hospital, Plateau before he was appointed as a Professor of forensic pathology at the Department of Pathology and Anatomy, Lagos State University College of Medicine in 2001. He served as the Provost of Lagos State University College of Medicine, Ikeja Campus from March 2006 to February 2010 before he was appointed the Vice-Chancellor of Lagos State University.

In 2024, he was appointed as the Director-General of the Nigerian Institute of Medical Research by President Bola Tinubu.

He is a fellow of the American College of Legal Medicine and the National Association of Medical Examiners; as well as other organizations including the Association of Pathologists of Nigeria, the Forensic Science Society, the British Association of Forensic Medicine, British Academy of Forensic Sciences, American Academy of Forensic Sciences, World Association of Police Surgeons, American College of Forensic Examiners and the College of American Pathologists.

== Publications and research ==
Obafunwa is a writer and author. He has lectured and published extensively in the fields of forensic pathology and legal medicine. Some of his published books and researches include:

- Liposarcoma of the cervix
- Gastric carcinoma in Plateau State, Nigeria
- Histopathologic study of vesical carcinoma in Plateau State, Nigeria
- Medico-legal aspects of deaths from motor boat and water sport injuries
- Diving Injuries and Barotrauma In: Forensic Medicine: Clinical and Pathological Aspect

== Controversy ==
Obafunwa came under severe criticism from the executives of the Academic Staff Union of Universities (ASUU), Senior Staff Association of Nigerian Universities (SSANU) and Non Academic Staff Union (NASU) and some number of students. On 18 March 2015, it was reported in the media that he was pelted with sachet water by staff during a protest after NASU-LASU accused him of owing them salaries for four months.
