= Michael Ekwemalor =

Nigerian businessman

- Born: Michael Andre Ekwemalor; October 28, 1980 (age 45); Lagos, Nigeria
- Citizenship: Nigerian
- Education: University of Oxford (AMP); Lagos State University (MBA)
- Occupations: Engineer; entrepreneur
- Years active: 2006 – present
- Organization: Mase Group
- Parents: Felicia Ekwemalor; Professor Anthony Ekwemalor
- Website: maseconstruct.com

Michael Andre Ekwemalor (born 28 October 1980) is a Nigerian engineer and entrepreneur. He serves as the group managing director of Mase Group.

== Early life and education ==
Michael Andre Ekwemalor was born in Lagos, Nigeria, on October 28, 1980, to Professor Anthony Ekwemalor and Felicia Ekwemalor, and he is originally from Aniocha North of Delta State, Nigeria. He was raised in both Delta State and Lagos, where he completed his early education and attended Anglican Grammar School for his secondary education.

Ekwemalor pursued higher education in business and engineering. He earned a Master of Business Administration (MBA) from Lagos State University and completed an Advanced Management Program at the University of Oxford. He also studied Civil Engineering at the Royal Institute of Chartered Engineers.

== Career ==
Ekwemalor began his professional career in 2006, After completing the National Youth Service Corps (NYSC), he worked at Dejoroe Nigeria Limited as a procurement officer and was later promoted to site manager, where he coordinated construction activities and supervised site operations for three years. He later joined Anidavid Nigeria Limited as a Project Manager. He was promoted to Director of Operations in 2010.

In 2011, he founded Mase Group, a Nigerian construction and infrastructure company operating through subsidiaries including Mase Construction Limited, Mase Power Limited, Mase Property Limited, and Mase Designs Limited. He serves as Group Managing Director and Chief Executive Officer.

Ekwemalor has remained actively involved in Nigeria’s construction sector. In 2024, he received the Engineering Practice and Excellence Leadership Award from the Nigerian Society of Engineers (NSE) on July 30, 2024, at the National Engineering Centre in Abuja.
