= Princess Oghene =

Nigerian businesswoman

Princess Kelechi Oghene
- Born: Zamfara State
- Education: Lagos State University; Harvard Business School
- Occupation: Fashion executive
- Years active: 2005-till date

Princess Kelechi Oghene also known as Princess Oghene (born 19 July) is a Nigerian entrepreneur and fashion executive. She is the founder of GMYT Academy, a fashion institution headquartered in Lagos State, Nigeria.

== Early life and education ==
Princess Oghene was born on 19 July in Gusau, Zamfara State but originally hails from Southern Nigeria, Delta State. She acquired her primary and secondary education in Lagos State, where she also spent most of her childhood. In 2010, she graduated from the Lagos State University with a Bachelors' Degree in Industrial Relations and Personnel Management. In 2017, she graduated from the Lagos Business School. In 2018, she proceeded to the University of the Arts, London College of Fashion and later on, Harvard Business School. In 2024, she received a certification in Global Business Strategy from China Europe International Business school (CEIBS).

== Career ==
Oghene’s passion for fashion started early and was greatly influenced by her mother. She came to limelight when she became the face of Delta Soap, alongside Sandra Okagbue. However, she officially started her fashion career in 2004 when she launched her fashion store. In 2005, she founded GMYT fashion academy, while still undergoing her undergraduate studies. In 2017, she launched the GMYT Foundation, an NGO focused on women empowerment and training of fashion entrepreneurs.

In 2019, she was recognized by the Women's Choice Awards Africa, as the model of the year. She was also named the Enterprising Fashion Designer of the Year for Green October Event 2017 and was recognized for her contribution to the fashion industry in the 2016 Green October Event.

In April 2024, Princess was awarded an honorary doctorate from Prowess University Delaware at the Africa's under 40 CEO Awards and Summit which she was also a recipient.
