= Cossy Orjiakor =

Nigerian actress and singer

- Born: Anambra State
- Citizenship: Nigeria
- Education: University of Nigeria; Lagos State University
- Occupations: Actress, singer
- Years active: 2012 - present (acting career)
- Website: www.Cossysecret.com

Cossy Orjiakor // is a Nigerian actress and singer. She came into the limelight after featuring in a music video by Obesere, and is controversially known for showing off her large bosoms at social events and in music videos. In 2015, she produced her first film, Power girls, under her production company Playgirl pictures.

== Early life and education ==
Orjiakor was born in Anambra State. She graduated with a second class upper in accounting and management at University of Nigeria, Nsukka and obtained a master's degree from Lagos State University.

== Personal life ==
Orjiakor's rise to fame was propelled by her significantly large breasts, which she frequently displays. She describes them as "a great gift from God", and stated she wouldn't breastfeed her kids directly to keep them firm. Daily Post described her as the "boob star" of Nollywood. Vanguard describes her as a "boobs toting" actress and singer. In an interview with Encomium Magazine she stated that being a mother is a higher priority than getting married.

In August 2020, Orjiakor announced her engagement to Abel Jurgen Wilhelm, a male fashion model of Nigerian-German heritage. Four months later in December 2020, Abel called off the couple's engagement on the grounds of domestic violence, stating that he had been physically attacked (bitten) by Orjiakor.

== Career ==
Orjiakor has ventured into many aspects of entertainment. She has featured in music videos, starred in films and has an album to her name, releasing her debut album Nutty Queen in 2013.

She highlighted exposure of her physique as part of her branding as an entertainer. but dismissed the possibility of going totally nude in a movie on moral grounds.

In January 2013, she was admonished by a female blogger to amend her lifestyle in order to stop the supposed negative perception on Igbo girls. She replied explaining that the letter was an act of "joblessness", and she has brought recognition to her country internationally through her career.

After the arrest of a man in 2016 by the Nigerian police for naming his dog Buhari, Orjiakor took to social media to disclose that she named her two cats Buhari and Goodluck, and dared the security agencies to arrest her too as she expressed her dissatisfaction with the state of the nation.

== Filmography ==
- Itohan (directed by Chico Ejiro)
- Ara Saraphina
- Pure Honey (2017) as Lara
- Anini (2005) as Abies
- Elastic Limit (2000) as Felix's Girlfriend
- Amobi
- One million boys
- Papa Ajasco

== See also ==
- List of Nigerian film producers
