= Enitan Bababunmi =

Nigerian academic

Enitan Abisogun Bababunmi

3rd Vice-Chancellor of Lagos State University
- In office 1993–1996
- Preceded by: Jadesola Akande
- Succeeded by: Fatiu Ademola Akesode

Personal details
- Born: 8 September 1940
- Died: 29 May 2017 (aged 76)
- Occupation: Biochemist

Enitan Abisogun Bababunmi (born 8 September 1940 – 29 May 2017) was a Nigerian academic and a Professor of Biochemistry who served as the third Vice-Chancellor of Lagos State University between 1993 and 1996.

== Recognition ==
In 2002, Enitan was granted a patent by the United States government after he produced a formulation that would prevent muscle atrophy in AIDS and cancer patients.

== Death ==
He died on 29 May 2017, aged 76.

== Bibliography ==
- Enitan A. Bababunmi (1982). Power House of the Living Cell. University of Ibadan.
- Toxicology Forum (Washington, D.C.); Wellcome Trust (London, England); World Health Organization (1 January 1980). Toxicology in the tropics. Taylor & Francis. ISBN 978-0-85066-194-1.
