= Olanrewaju Fagbohun =

Nigerian lawyer and academic (born 1966)

Olanrewaju Fagbohun SAN SAN
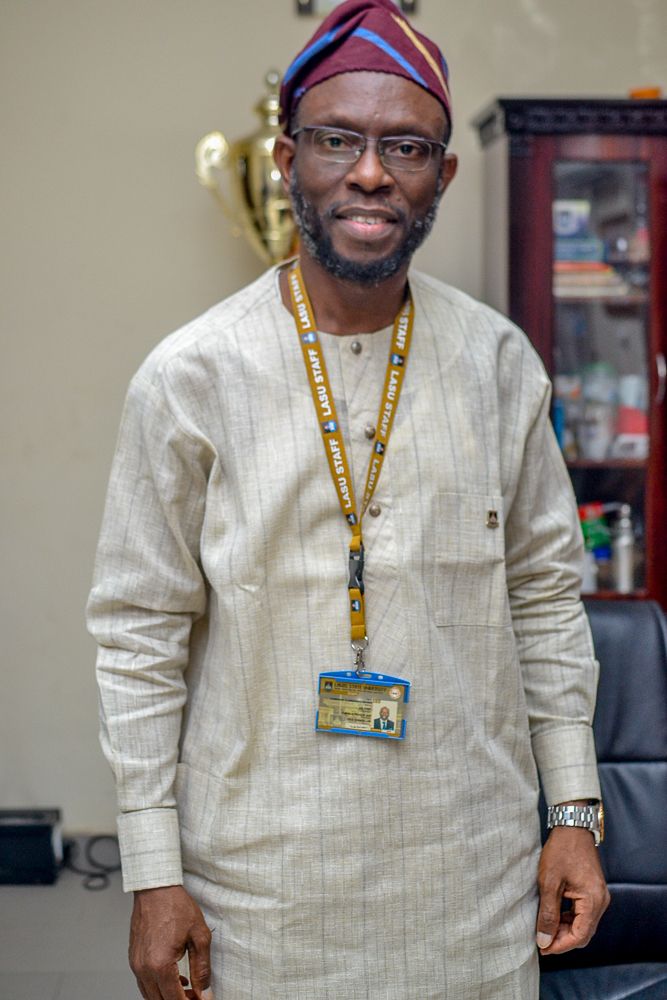
- Professor Olanrewaju Fagbohun SAN, the 8th substantive Vice chancellor of Lagos State University

8th Vice-Chancellor of Lagos State University
- In office 11 January 2016 – 10 January 2021
- Appointed by: Akinwunmi Ambode
- Preceded by: John Obafunwa
- Succeeded by: Ibiyemi Olatunji-Bello

Personal details
- Born: Olanrewaju Adigun Fagbohun; 19 October 1966 (age 59) Alimosho, Western Region, Nigeria (now in Lagos State)
- Education: University of Ife; University of Lagos
- Occupation: Academic; author
- Profession: Lawyer

Olanrewaju Adigun Fagbohun SAN (born 19 October 1966) is a Nigerian lawyer, academic, author, investor, professor of environmental law, regulations, and a Senior Advocate of Nigeria. He served as the 8th substantive vice-chancellor of Lagos State University between 11 January 2016 to 10 January 2021. His administration as LASU's vice chancellor witnessed tremendous gains in research, innovations and infrastructural development – which helped to propel the university from obscurity to the second best university in Nigeria according to the 2021 Times Higher Education ranking. He was appointed by the governor of Lagos State, Akinwunmi Ambode to succeed professor John Obafunwa, a Nigerian pathologist whose tenure ended on 31 October 2015. His appointment was lauded by the Lagos State University chapter of the Academic Staff Union of Universities. The association through the chapter chairman pledged their full support for good administration.

== Early life and education ==
Olanrewaju was born at Akesan, Alimosho, a local government area of Lagos State, southwestern Nigeria. He attended the local authority primary school at Agege and Ikeja Grammar School, Oshodi, Lagos where he obtained the West African Senior School Certificate. Thereafter, he obtained a Bachelor of Law, LLB degree in 1987 from the University of Ife, now Obafemi Awolowo University. Following the completion of the compulsory one year youth service program in 1989, he attended the Nigerian Law School before he was called to the bar. He later proceeded to the University of Lagos where he earned a master's degree in law and later returned to Obafemi Awolowo University where he received a doctorate degree in law. During the doctoral program, he received a Postgraduate diploma in International Tax Law from Robert Kennedy College, Switzerland.

== Career ==
Fagbohun began his academic career in January 1991 as an assistant lecturer at the Faculty of Law, Lagos State University where he rose to the rank of reader and associate professor of law in 2004 before he later became a full professor of environmental law in 2008. He is one of the academics that contributed to the development of the curriculum for the teaching of environmental law in Nigerian universities.

He had served as head of the Department of Business Law as well as of the Department of Private and Property Law. He was a member of the university's senate and Coordinator of the Department of Environmental Law and Allied Disciplines of the Centre for Environment and Science Education of the university. He was formerly the Editor-in-Chief of the LASU Law Journal.

In 2010, he joined the Nigerian Institute of Advanced Legal Studies, NIALS as senior academic staff. At the institute, he taught Advanced Legal Methods and Research as well as Advanced Environmental Law and Policy. He had served on different editorial board including the NIALS Journal of Environmental Law, Nigerian Current Law Review and LASU Journal of Law where he served as Editor-in-Chief of the journal. Prior to his appointment as the 8th substantive Vice Chancellor of the Lagos State University, he was the Director of Studies, DS and Director of Research in the university and Chike Idigbe Distinguished Professor of Law at the NIALS.

== Public services ==
Fagbohun served as project facilitator and resource person to the British Council and the Nigerian Bar Association. He served as a member of committee on Ecology and Environment of the Senate and the National Assembly. He served on the Advisory Committee of the Lagos State Environmental Protection Agency and on a Technical Advisory Committee on Environmental Management and Control(Downstream Oil and Gas Sector). He was formerly a member of the Lagos State Water Regulatory Commission and member of the expert group for the development of climate change policy and legislation for the Federal Republic of Nigeria. He also served as Chair of the Lagos State Local Government Election Petition Tribunal. He is the vice chairman of the African Regional Forum of the International Bar Association as well as the regional representative of Africa on Environment Health and Safety Committee of the International Bar Association. He is a member of the Board of Trustees of the Lagos Public Interest Law Partnership. He has served as external examiner for the award of master and doctorate degree in several universities in Nigeria. He has also served as external examiner at the University of Fort Hare, Eastern Cape, South Africa and the University of Amsterdam.

== Research and honour ==
Fagbohun's research interest focuses on the area of law and governance, sustainable development, environmental protection, sustainable livelihood and the environmental rights of indigenous groups. Since he became a professor, he had supervised several undergraduate and postgraduate students. He had published several scholarly articles in reputable academic journal as well as conference abstracts and monograph. He co-authored 8 books and he is the author of a book titled The Law of Oil Pollution and Environmental Restoration: A Comparative Review. Fagbohun is a receiver of numerous awards and fellowship. He is a member of several national and international professional bodies including the International Bar Association.

On 28 November 2019, Fagbohun was honored by the President of Nigeria, President Muhammadu Buhari with the National Productivity Order of Merit (NPOM) Award. The event took place at the NAF Conference Center and Suites, Kado, Abuja.

== Personal life ==
Fagbohun was born an Omo oba of the royal family of the traditional ruler of the Akesan area of Alimosho. He is married with children.

== Bibliography ==
- Olusegun Yerokun; Olanrewaju Fagbohun; Kayode Oyende (2007). Landmark Cases and Essays in Honour of Kehinde Sofola. Concept Publishers. ISBN 978-978-8065-89-0.
- Anthony Kola-Olusanya; Ayo Omotayo; Olanrewaju Fagbohun (2011). Environment and Sustainability: Issues, Policies & Contentions : in Honour of Professor Peter Okebukola. University Press Plc. ISBN 978-978-069-578-1.
- Dike, Gabriel (19 January 2016). "The making of new LASU VC". The Sun News.
