= Abdul Lateef A. Hussein =

Nigerian physicist (1947–2022)

Lateef Akanni Hussain

6th Vice-Chancellor of Lagos State University
- In office 2005–2011
- Preceded by: Abisogun Leigh
- Succeeded by: John Obafunwa

Personal details
- Born: Lateef Akanni Hussain; 26 October 1947 Lagos Island
- Died: 31 July 2022 (aged 74) Lagos
- Education: University of Ibadan
- Occupation: Physicist

Lateef Akanni Hussain (26 October 1947 – 31 July 2022) was a Nigerian physicist, academic administrator and former Vice-Chancellor of Lagos State University (LASU). He served as the 6th substantive Vice-Chancellor of LASU from 2005 to 2011. He was also a professor in the Department of Physics at University of Ibadan and a Fellow of the Nigerian Institute of Physics.

== Early life and education ==
Lateef Akanni Hussain was born in Lagos, Nigeria, on 26 October 1947. He attended the University of Ibadan, obtaining a B.Sc. in Physics (First Class Honours) in 1970. He later earned his Ph.D. in Solid-State Electronics from the University of Manchester Institute of Science and Technology (UMIST) in 1974. During his academic formation he received various scholarships and prizes, including University of Ibadan Scholarship (1967–1970); Departmental and NUMPENCO Faculty of Science Prize (1970); Nigerian Government Post-graduate Scholarship (1971–1974).

== Academic career ==
Hussain joined the University of Ibadan in November 1974 as a lecturer and advanced to the rank of professor of physics. He taught undergraduate and postgraduate courses in quantum physics, solid-state physics, and solar energy, and supervised numerous theses and dissertations. He also served in other academic roles such as Visiting Senior Lecturer and Acting Head, Department of Physical Sciences, University of Agriculture, Abeokuta (1990–1991), and part-time lecturer at LASU (1984). He acted as external examiner for universities such as University of Ghana, Legon; Obafemi Awolowo University, Ile-Ife; Ladoke Akintola University of Technology, Ogbomoso; University of Ilorin; and University of Lagos.

== Vice-Chancellorship of Lagos State University ==
Professor Lateef Akanni Hussain served as Vice-Chancellor of Lagos State University (LASU) from 2005 to 2011. His tenure was marked by administrative reforms, academic expansion, and efforts to modernize the university’s operational systems.

One of the notable developments during his administration was the introduction of improved information and communication technology infrastructure. LASU implemented electronic registration processes, online result-checking systems, and enhanced database management for students and staff. The university also expanded its ICT facilities, including improved internet connectivity and IT laboratories, aimed at strengthening teaching, research, and administrative efficiency.

Academically, his administration oversaw the introduction and development of new programs and schools, including Aeronautic Engineering, the School of Agriculture at the Epe campus, and a proposed School of Film and Cultural Studies. These initiatives expanded the university’s footprint into engineering, agricultural sciences, and creative disciplines, broadening LASU’s curriculum and strengthening its positioning as a more competitive and multidisciplinary state university.

Professor Hussain also introduced a merit-based scholarship scheme designed to reward academic excellence among students who attained high cumulative grade point averages, particularly those achieving a CGPA of 4.0 and above on a 5.0 scale. The awards were tied to sustained academic performance and good conduct, with several hundred students benefiting during his tenure. His administration similarly emphasized merit in staff recruitment and promotion, while implementing policies aimed at strengthening transparency, accountability, and institutional discipline within the university.

He was noted for maintaining an open communication style, including direct engagement with students and staff. During his tenure, the university conducted multiple convocation ceremonies, and students whose academic backlogs predated his administration were reportedly able to regularize their records and receive their certificates. His administration promoted reforms aimed at improving academic record management, strengthening standards, and enhancing institutional governance within the university.

Professor Hussain’s vice-chancellorship was marked by initiatives to modernize the university’s administrative and information systems, including the adoption of electronic registration processes and strengthened academic record management. His administration expanded LASU’s academic offerings through new program initiatives and promoted meritocracy by introducing performance-based student scholarships alongside merit-driven staff recruitment and promotion policies. His tenure featured multiple convocation ceremonies and governance reforms aimed at institutional discipline.

== Research and publications ==
Professor Hussain’s research spans solar energy technologies, radiation effects in solids, computational modelling and analysis of thermodynamics of liquid alloys. His doctoral thesis was titled *“Radiation Damage in Silicon Solar Cells”* (UMIST, 1974). He published in journals including Journal of Physics D: Applied Physics; Pure and Applied Geophysics; Radiation Measurements; Journal of Alloys and Compounds. Some selected works:

- Hussain, L.A. & Northrop, D.C. (1975). “Electron Radiation Damage in Diffused Silicon Solar Cells.” Journal of Physics D: Applied Physics.
- Giwa, F.B.A. & Hussain, L.A. (1978). “A Theory of Atmospheric Tides Generated by Differential Heating Between Land and Sea.” Pure and Applied Geophysics.
- O. Agunloye and L. A. Hussain (1982): A Laboratory Method for Measuring the Electrical Resistivity of Arbitrary – shaped Geologic Samples. Nig. Jour. Min. Geol. 19(2). 15 - 20.
- L.A.Hussain and O. Akinlade (1987): A model Potential and Its Application' Phys. Stat. Sol, (b). 139. K123 - K128.
- Awe, O.E., Akinlade, O. & Hussain, L.A. (2003). “Thermodynamic Properties of Liquid Te–Ga and Te–Tl Alloys.” Journal of Alloys and Compounds.
- G. A. Adebayo, O. Akinlade and L.A.Hussain (2005): Structure and autocorrelation functions of liquid Al and Mg modeled via Lennard-Jones potential from molecular dynamics simulation. Pramana. J. Physics Vol. 64 No.2,269-279.30.
- O. E. Awe, Y. A. Odusote, O. Akinlade, L. A. Hussain (2011): Temperature dependence of thermodynamic properties of Si-Ti binary liquid alloys. ThermochimicaActa Vol. 519,1-5

== Administrative roles ==
At the University of Ibadan, Professor Hussain held several leadership positions including Sub-Dean, Faculty of Science (1985–1987); Chairman, General Studies Programme (1998–2001); Director, Equipment Maintenance Centre (1998–2001); and Dean, Faculty of Science (2001–2003). He also served as Technical Director at the Federal Radiation Protection Service (FRPS), University of Ibadan (1986–1989). Head, Department of Physics, University of Ibadan (2015 to 2017 Retirement).

== Personal life and death ==
Professor Hussain was married to Mrs Abosede Modupe Hussain and the marriage was blessed with four children. He passed away after a brief illness on Sunday 31 July 2022, at the age of 74.

== See also ==
- University of Ibadan
- Lagos State University
- Nigerian Institute of Physics
