= Fatiu Ademola Akesode =

Nigerian academic

4th Vice-Chancellor of Lagos State University
- In office February 1997 – 30 March 2001
- Preceded by: Enitan Bababunmi
- Succeeded by: Abisogun Leigh

Personal details
- Born: April 1940 Lagos State, Nigeria
- Died: 30 March 2001 (aged 60)
- Party: Non-Partisan

Fatiu Ademola Akesode (April 1940 – 30 March 2001) was a Nigerian professor of paediatrics, educational administrator, and former vice chancellor of Lagos State University Lagos State, Nigeria.

== Education ==
He was born in Lagos Island, into the Bajulaiye family. He had his primary education at Ansar-Ud-Deen Primary School, Amuto Okepopo and later attended Methodist Boys' High School in 1954 for his secondary education. In 1962, he proceeded to the College of Medicine, University of Lagos. After his first degree in medicine, he obtained a Master of Science (M.sc) degree in public health from Johns Hopkins University in 1968 and a Doctorate (P.hD) degree in paediatrics from Baltimore, Maryland, USA where he received the American Heart Foundation Fellowship award in 1973.

== Career ==
He began his career as a Chief Resident in Paediatrics at Baltimore, Maryland, USA. He later became a lecturer of Public Health at the University of British Columbia, Vancouver, B.C, Canada in 1978. He left the university for University of Lagos where he lectured as a Senior Lecturer in Pediatrics for five years (1982-1987). He was appointed Professor of Paediatrics on June 1, 1988 at Ogun state university, now Olabisi Onabanjo University. He was later appointed as Chief Medical Director of the Ogun state university teaching hospital, a position he held until his appointment as Vice-Chancellor of Lagos State University in 1997. He died on 30 March 2001.

== Awards and fellowship ==
- United States National Institute of Health Research Award in Paediatrics(1975-1976).
- Fellow of the Nigerian Medical College (Public Health) (1978)
- Fellow of the West African College of Physicians (1980)
- World Health Organization, WHO Research Award on Breast-Feeding (1988–93)
- British Overseas Development Agency Award for the study of Sexually Transmitted Diseases (1996)
