= Akesan, Lagos =

Akesan is a small town located in Alimosho local government area of Lagos State.

== Notable people ==
- Olanrewaju Fagbohun – Vice-Chancellor, Lagos State University

== Education ==
- O'Mark Schools
