= Folabi Olumide =

Nigerian surgeon and academic (1936–2021)

Afolabi Olumide

1st Vice-Chancellor of Lagos State University
- In office 1983–1988
- Succeeded by: Jadesola Akande

Personal details
- Born: Olufolabi Olumide; 1936
- Died: 8 January 2021 (aged 84–85)
- Education: University of Ibadan

Folabi Olumide (1936 – 8 January 2021 ) was a Nigerian academic and medical surgeon best known for being the first Vice-Chancellor of Lagos State University, a position he held from 1983–1988.

Olumide died from COVID-19 in 2021.

== Bibliography ==
- Randle, Bashorun (1 May 2016). "Olumide… The odd man out". The Guardian.
