= Brazilian Quarters =

Historic district of Lagos Island, Nigeria

The Portuguese/Brazilian Quarters commonly known as Aguda or Popo Aguda, is a historic district on Lagos Island, Nigeria. Established in the 19th century, it was built by Agudas (freed Afro-Brazilian and Cuban slaves) who returned to West Africa. It is a historic neighborhood that points to the transatlantic return of freed Afro-Brazilian slaves in the 19th century. It is centered around Campos Square and stretches along streets like Tokunbo, Bamgbose, and Kakawa. It has a unique fusion of Afro-Brazilian culture, architecture, and commerce.

== History ==
The first recorded repatriation of African people from Brazil to what is now Nigeria was a government-led deportation in 1835 in the aftermath of a Yoruba and Hausa rebellion in the city of Salvador known as the Malê Revolt. After the rebellion, the Brazilian government - fearful of further insurrection - allowed freed Africans the option to return home or keep paying an exorbitant tax to the government. A few Africans who were free and had saved some money were able to return to Africa as a result of the tough conditions, taxation, racism and homesickness. In 1851, 60 Mina Africans put together $4,000 to charter a ship for Badagry.

After slavery was abolished in Cuba and Brazil in 1886 and 1888 respectively, further migration to Lagos continued. Many of the returnees chose to return to Nigeria for cultural, missionary and economic reasons; and since many of them were of Yoruba ethnicity, they settled in Western Nigeria. Other major ethnicity among the returnees included Hausa and Ewe. By the 1880s, they comprised about 9% of the population of Lagos. By 1888, an estimated 3,000 returnees lived in Lagos, concentrated in the watery terrain area now known as the Brazilian Quarters (Popo Aguda), a land provided by Oba Ojulari. The term Popo Aguda is generally believed to derive from references to Portuguese-speaking returnees who had acquired Brazilian and Portuguese cultural influences during their time in Brazil & Cuba. These returnees, called Agudas (a Yoruba corruption of "Portuguese"), brought with them not only Catholicism and Portuguese surnames (e.g., Da Silva, Cardoso) but also building skills and culinary traditions. Towards the end of 1920, the migration stopped.

== Architecture ==
The quarter is distinguished by its sobrado‑style townhouses: two‑storey buildings with steeply pitched roofs, ornate wooden balconies, louvered shutters, and pastel‑coloured facades. Ground floors often served as shops or warehouses, while upper floors were residential. The design adapted Portuguese colonial models to the humid tropical climate. By 2014, fewer than 40% of original Brazilian‑era structures remained intact due to demolition and neglect. Ironwork was among the strongest and most enduring contributions of these returnee artisans.

=== Branco house ===
The Branco house was a two-storey house in Kakawa street of the Brazilian Quarter, probably owned by Joaquim Francisco Devodê Branco. It was demolished sometime after 1948 and before 1970.

=== Water house ===
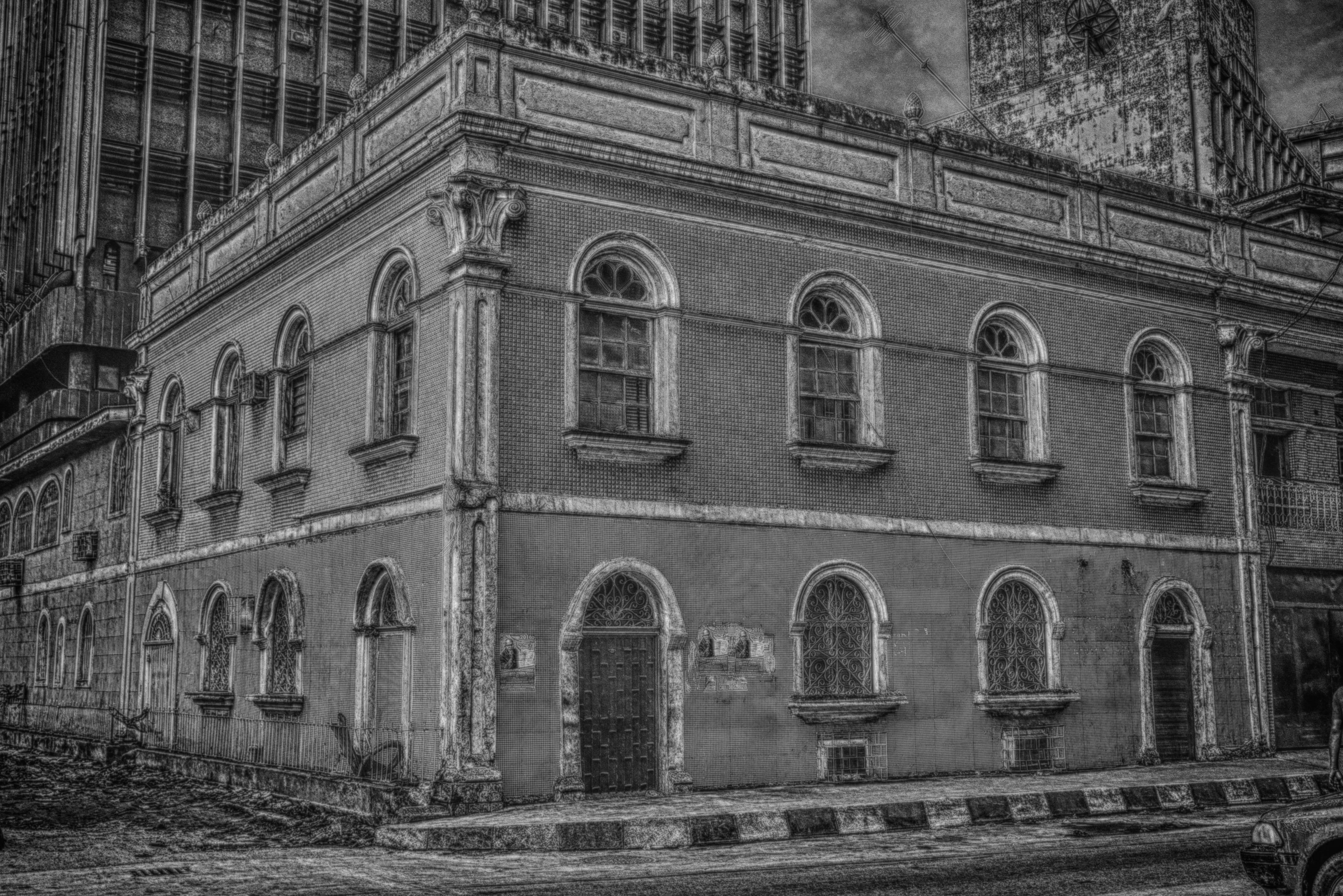
Water House Lagos

The Water House is one of the few remaining residential buildings that showcases Brazilian architectural style in Nigeria. The building is located in Kakawa street, downtown Lagos, Lagos Island and built in the 19th century during the era of the Lagos colony. It was owned and inhabited by Candido Da Rocha.

== Cultural contributions ==
The Brazilian Quarters made some contributions to the cultural development of Lagos. Afro-Brazilian influences became evident in music, cuisine, fashion, language, and festive traditions. One of the most notable legacies of the community is its contribution to carnival culture in Lagos, particularly through the development of the Lagos Fanti Carnival, which combines African and Brazilian performance traditions.

Returnees introduced Catholic institutions, including the Cathedral of the Holy Cross (built 1882) on Campos Square, one of the oldest Catholic churches in Nigeria. Brazilian dishes such as acarajé (deep‑fried bean fritters), feijoada (bean and meat stew), and farofa (cassava meal) were adapted into Yoruba cuisine, influencing staples like garri.

== Religion ==
Religion was a central aspect of Aguda identity. Catholicism was introduced into Lagos traditions by the returnees. As a result of this, Popo Aguda became closely associated with Catholic institutions, churches, and schools. The Holy Cross Cathedral is located within the Brazilian Quarters. While Catholicism remained influential, many families retained aspects of Yoruba culture. This resulted in a religious landscape that reflected both African and Brazilian influences.

== Heritage and present condition ==
Despite its historical significance, Popo Aguda faces substantial challenges associated with urban development and heritage conservation. Since the late 20th century, the Brazilian Quarters has experienced urban decay and redevelopment pressure. Many sobrado houses are subdivided into rental rooms; balconies sag under makeshift wiring. The Lagos State Government designated part of the area a conservation zone in the 1990s but enforcement has been limited. in 2021, an Afro-Brazilian Cultural Centre was built by the Lagos State Government and commissioned by then Nigerian Minister of Information Lai Mohammed.

== Sources ==
- Cunha, Marianno Carneiro da (1985). Da senzala ao sobrado: arquitetura brasileira na Nigéria e na República Popular do Benim [From slave quarters to town houses : Brazilian architecture in Nigeria and the People's Republic of Benin]. Photographs by Pierre Verger. São Paulo: SP: Nobel.
- Alonge, Marjorie Moji Dolapo (1994). Afro-Brazilian architecture in Lagos State : a case for conservation (Thesis). Newcastle University. hdl:10443/883.
- da Costa, A. B. F (1994). "Lagos's Brazilian Houses: A Surviving Legacy."". African Arts. 27 (3): 56–63.
- Akinsemoyin, Kunle; Vaughan-Richards, Akinsemoyin, K., & Vaughan-Richards, A. (1976). Building Lagos. (1976). Building Lagos. Lagos: F. & A. Services.
- Olukoju, Ayodeji (2003). "Infrastructure Development and Urban Facilities in Lagos, 1861–2000". Lagos Historical Review. 3 (1): 1–24.
