= Ayodeji Badejo =

Nigerian Academic

- Born: Ayodeji Olawunmi Badejo; August 4, 1962 (age 64)
- Citizenship: Nigeria
- Occupations: Counsellor; academician

Academic background
- Education: B. A., Ahmadu Bello University, Zaria (1986); M. Ed and PhD, University of Lagos (1988, 1998)

Academic work
- Sub-discipline: Guidance and Counselling
- Institutions: University of Lagos

Ayodeji Olawunmi Badejo is a Nigerian professor of counselling psychology at the Department of Educational Foundations and Counselling Psychology at Lagos State University (LASU). In September 2026, she was appointed the 10th substantive Vice-Chancellor of Lagos State University by the Governor of Lagos State, Babajide Sanwo-Olu. She will resume office on 20 September 2026 to take over from Ibijoke Bello.

== Early life and education ==
Badejo was given birth to on 4 August 1962. She received her Nigeria Certificate in Education (NCE) in 1983, obtained a Bachelor of Education (B.Ed.) degree in 1986 from Ahmadu Bello University, Zaria, bagged a Master of Education (M.Ed.) degree in 1988. In 1998, she bagged her doctorate in Guidance and Counselling from the University of Lagos.

== Vice chancellorship ==
On 9 September 2026, Lagos State Governor, Babajide Sanwo-Olu appointed Badejo as the university's 10th substantive vice-chancellor and will resume office on the 20 September 2026
