= Jadesola Akande =

Nigerian lawyer and academic (1940 – 2008)

2nd Vice-Chancellor of Lagos State University
- In office 1989–1993
- Preceded by: Folabi Olumide
- Succeeded by: Enitan Bababunmi

Personal details
- Born: Jadesola Olayinka Esan; 15 November 1940 Ibadan, Oyo State, Nigeria
- Died: 29 April 2008 (aged 67) Lagos State, Nigeria
- Occupation: Lawyer; academic; activist; author

Jadesola Olayinka Akande (CON, OFR) (15 November 1940 – 29 April 2008) was a Nigerian lawyer, author and academic who is regarded as the first Nigerian female professor of Law.

== Early life and education ==
Akande Jadesola Olayinka was born on 15 November 1940, in Ibadan Oyo State, defunct Western Region of Nigeria. She completed her nursery, basic and secondary school education at Ibadan People's Girls School and St. Annes School respectively. She obtained her G.C.E Advanced Level certificate after attending Barnstaple Girls Grammar School Devon, England before proceeding to study a course in Law at the University College, London where she graduated from in 1963.

== Career ==
After her call to the bar at the Inner Temple, London and the Nigerian Law School, She returned to Nigeria where she began her career as an Administrative Officer in the West Regional Civil Service. She was a key member of the Constitutional Review Committee of 1987, and the Presidential Panel of National Security in 2000.

In April 1989, Akande was appointed as the second Vice-Chancellor of Lagos State University, a position she held till 1993, after quitting as a lecturer at the University of Lagos. In 2000, she was appointed the Pro-Chancellor of the Federal University of Technology, Akure until 2004. She was a key member of the Constitutional Review Committee of 1987 and the Presidential Panel of National Security in 2000. Her wealth of experience was second to none.

== Works ==
- Jadesola Olayinka Debo Akande (1979). Laws and Customs Affecting Women's Status in Nigeria. International Federation of Women Lawyers (Nigeria).
- Jadesola Akande; Mariame Ouattara (2007). Training Manual for the Participation of Women in Governance: Advocacy, Lobbying Networking, Coalition-building and Negotiation. WiLDAF/FeDDAF West Africa.
- Jadesola Akande; Peter O. Adeniyi (2002). Addresses Delivered on the First Day of the Combined 13th and 14th Convocation :: Friday, 1st November, 2002. Federal University of Technology.

== Honours and accolades ==
- Commander of the Order of the Niger (CON) – 1998
- National Honour of the Order of the Niger (OFR) – 2002
