= Territories of the Awori =

The Territories of the Awori are a part of Nigeria inhabited by the Awori tribe sub-ethnic group of the Yoruba people, speaking a distinct dialect of the Yoruba language. Traditionally, Awori are found in two Nigerian States: Ogun and Lagos.

== Territories with significant inhabitants ==
The Awori could be grouped into two major divisions. These are the early Awori and the latter Awori groups. Among the early Awori group of settlement are Otta, Ado-Odo, Isheri, Otto-Awori, Iddo, Ebute Metta, Apa, Ibereko etc.

=== Lagos State ===
Awori is generally considered to be the earliest dominant tribe in Lagos, even though the throne for the Oba of Lagos had its origin from Benin.

In an interview with The Punch, Nigerian lawyer and elder statesman, Lateef Olufemi Okunnu described the Aworis as being the original inhabitants of Lagos State. He noted that they settled in Lagos about half a millennium ago, long before the Bini invasion of Lagos.

Sola Ebiseni, a former commissioner for environment in Ondo State and Awori-born legal practitioner in a publication for Vanguard, emphasized that early Awori territories in Lagos was governed through the Idejo chiefs, who had policies that ensured possession and increase of their land. He historically cited Awori as the second most populous indigenous tribe in Lagos, only surpassed by Ilaje people. Significant populations were described to have settled in Apapa, Ajegunle, Makoko, Iwaya, Bariga, Oko Baba, Oto, Ebute-Metta, Oyingbo, Ijora, Igbo Elejo, Ojo, Aloro Island (off the coast of Kirikiri) Ajah, Badore, Iton Agan, Oworonsoki, Agboyi, Bayeku etc.

In 2017, Erelu Kuti of Lagos, Abiola Dosunmu controversially refuted claims that the Awori's were the original "owners" of Lagos. She described Lagos as firstly being an "extension of the Benin kingdom". She also stated that after the emigration of the Awori tribe they were initially paying royalties to the Oba of Benin. Her position was denied by Oba of Lagos, who earlier espoused the significance of Bini in the creation of Lagos but claimed that the Benin were not the owners of Lagos.

The Awori constitute the bulk of the indigenous population of sixteen, out of the twenty local government areas of Lagos State as at the year 2003, the only exceptions being Epe, Ikorodu and IbejuLekki with minimal Awori inhabitants. In these areas, they have developed many kingdoms and chiefdoms. Speaking against a proposed Lagoon State, Awori Welfare Association of Nigeria (AWAN) advocated for more local governments for Aworiland, instead of creation of more states as marginalization of minorities will come to play if done. They also identified the insensitivity of the actors due to lack of consultation as a reason for their refusal. Apapa, Iganmu, Somolu, Bariga, Akoka, Eti-Okun, Iwerekun, Kosofe, Agboyi, Ketu, Obalende/lkoyi, Iru/Victoria Island, Eti-Osa East, Eti-Osa West, Eti-Osa Central, Etikun, Ibeshe and Majidun towns were described as Aworiland in the proposed state.

=== Ogun State ===
The Awori people in Ogun State are located in Ogun West senatorial district, a portion that represents 37 percent of the entire area and 31% of the population in the state.
