= Federal Competition and Consumer Protection Commission =

Nigerian competition regulation agency

Federal Competition and Consumer Protection Commission (FCCPC)
Agency overview
- Formed: 2018
- Jurisdiction: Nigeria
- Headquarters: Maitama, FCT, Nigeria
- Agency executive: Olatunji Bello, Chief Executive Officer
- Parent department: Federal Ministry of Industry, Trade and Investment
- Website: http://fccpc.gov.ng/

The Federal Competition and Consumer Protection Commission (FCCPC) is the highest federal competition regulator in Nigeria. The FCCPC operates within the Federal Ministry of Industry, Trade and Investment and is responsible for protecting market competition and promoting consumer protection.

== History ==
The Commission was established by the Federal Competition and Consumer Protection Act (FCCPA) 2018. among others, develop and promote fair, efficient and competitive markets in the Nigerian economy, facilitate access by all citizens to safe products, and secure the protection of rights for all consumers in Nigeria.

In 2020, the FCCPC signed a "memorandum of understanding" with the U.S. Federal Trade Commission (FTC), pledging international cooperation in the realm of consumer protection efforts.

== Offices ==
The FCCPC currently has offices in the following cities:

- Abuja, Federal Capital Territory
- Lagos, Lagos State
- Port Harcourt, Rivers State
- Awka, Anambra State
- Osogbo, Osun State
- Minna, Niger State
- Bauchi, Bauchi State
- Katsina, Katsina State
- Kano, Kano State

== Activities ==
Given the significance of the petroleum industry in Nigeria, one of the primary tasks of the FCCPC has been to rein in anti-competitive conduct in the natural gas market. In the realm of consumer protection, the FCCPC has intervened in the healthcare sector to protect the rights of patients. The Commission in fulfilment of its statutory mandate deploys several regulatory tools to monitor and modify behaviour of service providers and manufacturers. Some key areas of operation include complaint resolution, surveillance and enforcement, consumer education, as well as research and strategy. The former head of the FCCPC stated in 2024 that major tech companies should anticipate regulatory scrutiny from the Commission.

=== Notable cases ===
- In December 2023, the FCCPC fined British American Tobacco USD$110 million over alleged violations of competition law and national public health regulations
- In July 2024, the FCCPC fined Facebook parent company Meta Platforms USD$220 million for alleged violations of Nigerian data privacy and consumer protection laws

== Leadership ==
On June 24, 2024, President Bola Tinubu approved the appointment of Olatunji Bello as the new Chief Executive Officer/Executive Vice-Chairman of the Federal Competition and Consumer Protection Commission (FCCPC). Bello is a lawyer, administrator, and renowned journalist. The President expects that the new Chief Executive Officer of this important agency will ensure the holistic realization of the Commission’s mandate of protecting and promoting the interest and welfare of Nigerian consumers, and ensuring the adoption of measures to guarantee the safety and quality of goods and services.

== See also ==
- "FCCPC Act". Archived from the original on 2020-09-17.
