= Lagos State University =

Public university in Ojo, Nigeria

Coordinates: 6.4652°N 3.2009°E

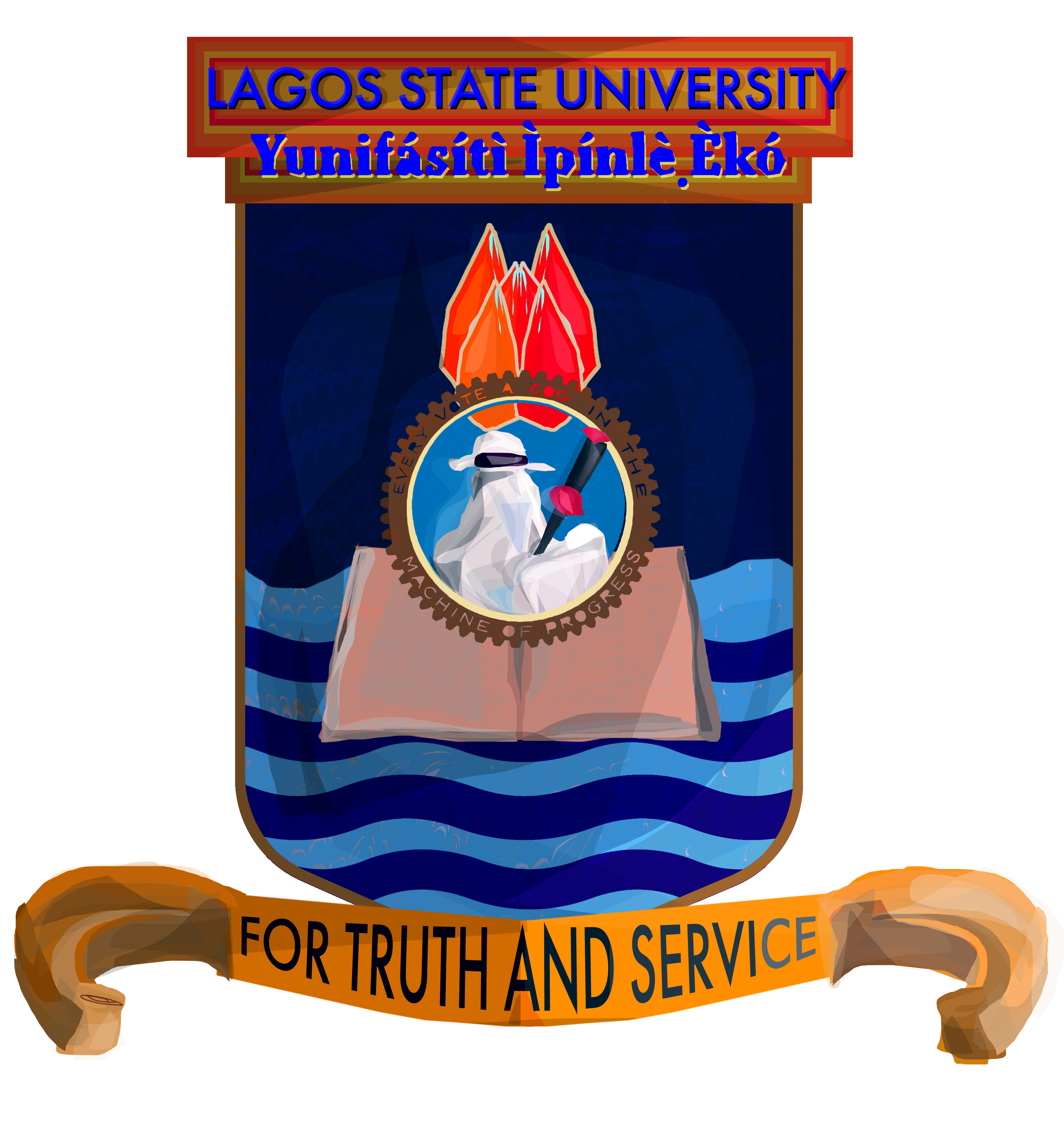
- The Seal of Lagos State University
- Motto: "For Truth and Service"
- Type: Public
- Established: 1983
- Chancellor: Gbolahan Elias, SAN
- Vice-Chancellor: Ayodeji Badejo
- Students: 35,000
- Location: Ojo, Lagos State, Nigeria
- Website: www.lasu.edu.ng

Lagos State University (LASU) is a state-owned university established by the Lagos State government in 1983. Its main campus is situated at Alasia, Lagos, Ojo, with sub-campuses at Ikeja and Epe. The university was set up "for the advancement of learning and establishment of academic excellence". The university caters to over 35,000 students. The university was established during the administration of Lateef Kayode Jakande.

The university offers diploma, degree and post graduate programmes, including an MBA programme. LASU was ranked among the top 600 universities in the world by the Times Higher Education World University Rankings for 2020. On 23 June 2021, LASU emerged as the best young university in Nigeria having been below the age of 50 years to be added.

Times Higher Education ranked the Lagos State University as the second best university in Nigeria on 2 September 2020, and was the only state university included in the rankings for 2022. The university has attracted international funding, including for the establishment of a World Bank Group Africa Centre for Excellence on Science, Technology, Engineering, and Mathematics.

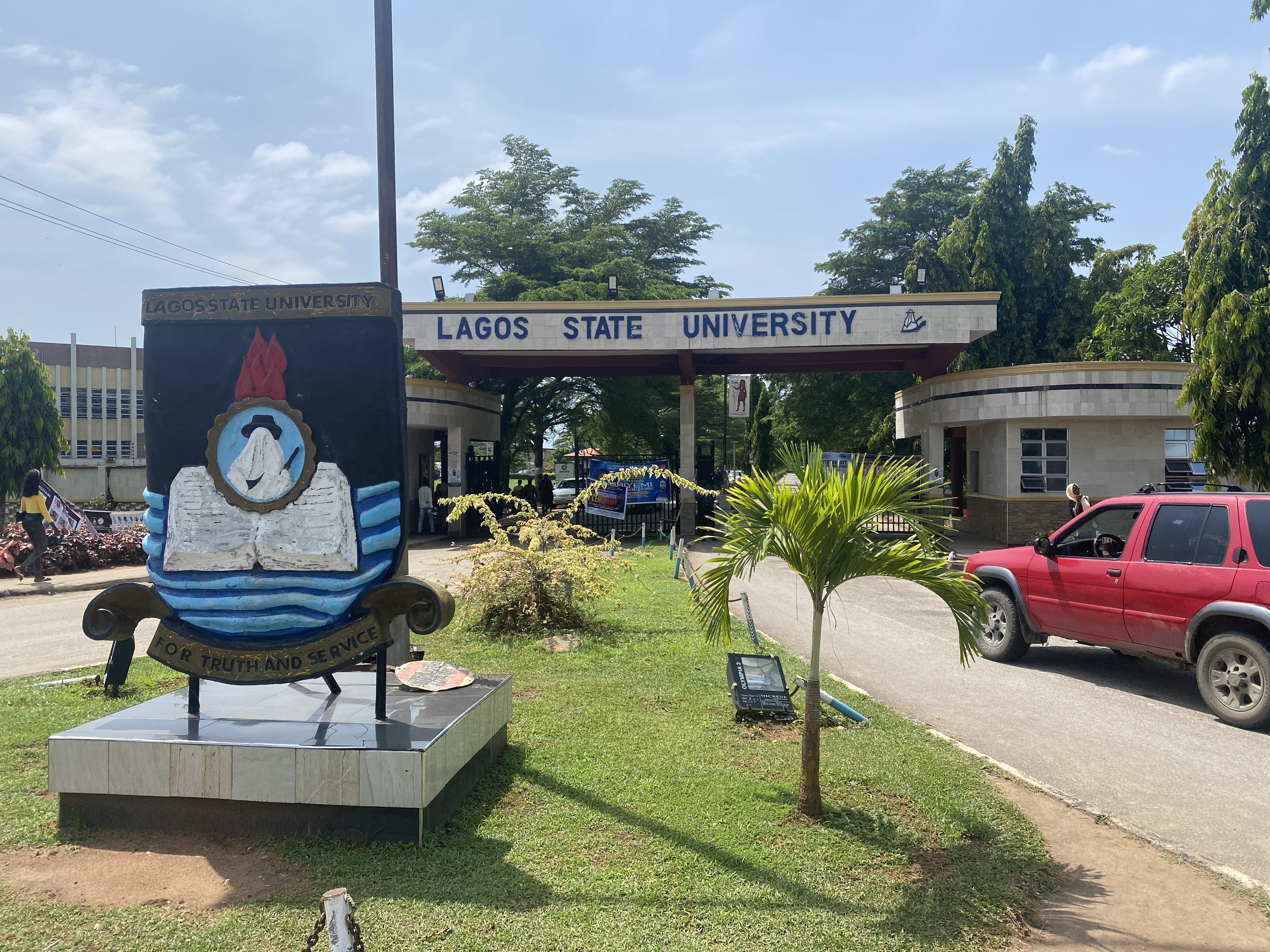
University gate

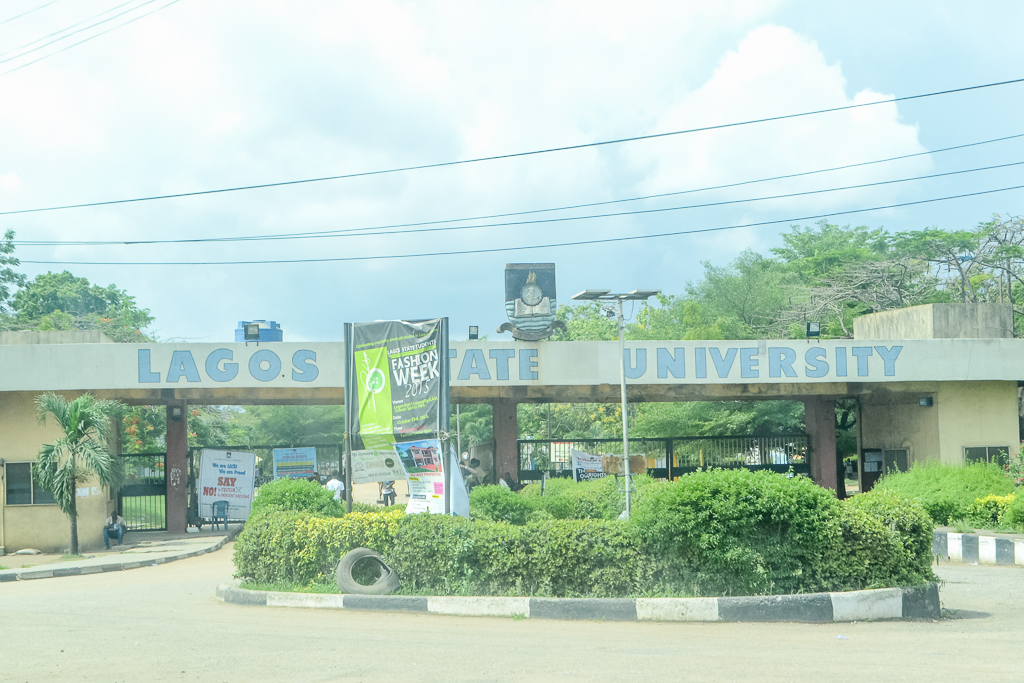
The entrance to the university

== History ==
The university was initially conceived as a multi-campus, non-residential university. It operates a multi-campus system with four fully owned campuses having its main campus at Ojo (along the Badagry Expressway) and other campuses at Epe (where the Faculties of Engineering and the Faculty of Agriculture are located), Ikeja (where the College of Medicine is located).

LASU AT NIGHT

A 300-seat theatre hall is under construction at the school's main campus in Ojo by the Awori Welfare Association of Nigeria (AWAN). The project site is opposite the Babatunde Raji Fashola Senate House. It is flanked by a new library building, which is still under construction, and the existing student affairs building. When finished, the building will serve as a lecture hall for students with offices and secretariat.

The university began with three faculties: Commerce and Business Administration, Law and Medicine. The Faculty of Commerce and Business Administration was changed to the Faculty of Business and Social Studies at its first meeting the board. The faculties of arts, education, engineering, social sciences, management sciences, science, communication and media studies, and the School of Transport were added later.

== Epe campus ==
The Epe campus is located on the north side of the Lekki Lagoon and houses the Faculty of Engineering, School of Agriculture, Faculty of Environmental Sciences, School of Pre-degree Studies, and diploma programmes. The Epe campus is fully residential, and was developed because the Ojo campus could not accommodate the Faculty of Engineering as population became larger. The campus was converted from military barracks that were released by the persuasion of the then military governor in the regime of Olusegun Obasanjo. The campus is home for the school's pre-degree studies and diploma programs, and is the largest property belonging to the school, larger than the main campus.

The Epe campus has an information commons that could be referred to as the library. The modern building was built and commissioned in the later part of 2008 by the then Chairman of the Governing Council, Mr Kekere-Ekun (OFR). It has a sitting capacity of 400 in its reading area with seating for 100 in the free wifi-connected e-library section.

The Epe library offers information services to the students and staff of the university and works in collaboration with the faculty to deliver best teaching, learning and research experience that is comparable to other higher learning institutions in the country. The library's administrative head on the campus is known as the head of library, who takes directives from the university librarian at the main campus in Ojo.

Six departments of the Faculty of Engineering are based at the Epe campus: mechanical engineering, electronics and computer engineering, chemical engineering, aeronautical and astronautical engineering, civil engineering, and industrial and system engineering, which was added in 2021.

The Epe campus is being governed by a head of campus (H.O.C.) who has a similar role to a vice-chancellor, and supervises academic and non-academic activities on the campus. The School of Agriculture has its dean and the Faculty of Engineering. The school is generally administered by the vice-chancellor who has his seat at the main campus, Ojo. The campus produces a candidate for the post of vice president, welfare director, and assistant general secretary in its student union government representing the university campus at the main campus; Ojo. As of 2021, the head of the Epe campus was Professor R.O. Okuneye and Adeyemi Sultan.

Faculty of Education, Ojo.

The campus also runs postgraduate programmes across the three old engineering departments namely: mechanical engineering, electronics and computer engineering, chemical engineering. For an academically conducive environment, the campus does not rely on the public power grid but owns an alternative power source. The campus generator supplies power to the student's hostels, lecture rooms, and staff quarters. In 2020, the Army arrived and occupied parts of the university structures.

== Programmes ==
Areas of education and research offered by the Institution are summarised in the table below:

Faculty	Departments / Programmes / Centres / Institutes
Faculty of Arts	Foreign Languages (French, Russian, Arabic and Portuguese); English Language; English Literature; Linguistics, African Studies and Asian Studies; Department of Philosophy; Department of History and International studies; Creative Arts: Visual Arts; Creative Arts: Theatre Arts; Creative Arts: Music
Faculty of Social Sciences	Department of Economics; Department of Political Science; Department of Geography and Planning; Department of Social Work; Department of Psychology; Department of Criminology and Security Studies; Department of Sociology; Public and International Affairs; Transportation Planning and Management
Faculty of Management Sciences	Business Administration; Industrial Relations and Personnel Management; Insurance; Accounting; Banking and Finance; Project Management Technology; Marketing; Public Administration
Faculty of Law	Jurisprudence and International Law; Commercial and Industrial law; Public Law; Islamic Law; Private and Property Law; Legal Studies
Faculty of Science	Department of Mathematics; Department of Physics; Department of Chemistry; Department of Computer Science; Department of Zoology and Environmental Biology; Department of Fisheries; Department of Botany; Department of Microbiology
Faculty of Engineering	Chemical and Polymer Engineering; Electronic and Computer Engineering; Mechanical Engineering; Aeronautical and Astronautical Engineering; Civil Engineering; Industrial and system Engineering
Faculty of Clinical Sciences	Medicine and Surgery; Dentistry; Pharmacology; Nursing
Faculty of Education	Guidance and Counseling; Adult Education; Adult Education Management; Adult Literacy and Non-formal Education; Mathematics education; Physics education; Biology education; Chemistry education; Integrated Science education; Social Studies education; Geography Education; History Education; Human Kinetics and Health Education; Exercise Physiology; Sports Administration/Management; Home Economics Education; Technology education; Business Education; English Education; English Literature education; French Education; Yoruba Education; Christian Religious Studies; Islamic Studies Education; Religion Education; Music education; Curriculum Theory; Educational administration and Planning; Educational Psychology; Philosophy of education; Sociology of education
Faculty of Basic Medical Sciences	Physiology; Biochemistry
School of communication	Broadcasting; Journalism; Public relations and advertising
School of transport	Transport management and operations

The two-stream system was introduced in 2019 by Vice-Chancellor Olanrewaju Fagbohun, who stated that the innovation would to provide handicraft knowledge to students, would add value to their knowledge base and would encourage self-employment.

== Campus radio station ==
The campus radio station LASU Radio (95.7 FM) is located on the university's main Ojo campus. It was founded in 2016.

== Vice-chancellor ==
The vice-chancellor of Lagos State University is the executive head of the university. Upon appointment by the Governor of Lagos State, the vice-chancellor assumes overall responsibility for the policy and administration of the university.

Ayodeji Badejo is the tenth substantive vice-chancellor of the Lagos State University; she was appointed on 9 September 2026 and assumed duty on 20 September 2026, succeeding Ibiyemi Olatunji-Bello, whose tenure ended on 19 September 2026.

The Lagos State University (LASU) Ojo started its work-study program with a group of ten students studying various courses as a pilot set. The plan is one of the administration's six-cardinal priorities, according to Ibiyemi Olatunji-Bello.

=== Vice-chancellors ===
1. Folabi Olumide (1983–1988)
2. Jadesola Akande (1989–1993)
3. Enitan Bababunmi (1993–1996)
4. Fatiu Ademola Akesode (1997–2001)
5. Abisogun Leigh (2001–2005)
6. Abdul Lateef A. Hussein (2005–2011)
7. John Obafunwa (2011–2015)
8. Olanrewaju Fagbohun (2016–2021)
9. Ibiyemi Olatunji-Bello (2021–2026)
10. Ayodeji Badejo (2026–present)

== Notable alumni ==
- Oluranti Adebule, former deputy governor Lagos State.
- Ogunleye Gbolahan Adetokunbo, politician
- Chris Ayebusiwa, politician
- Eniola Badmus, actress.
- Brymo, singer and songwriter.
- Chioma Chukwuka, musician, actress
- Liz Da-Silva, actress
- Tunji Disu, police officer
- Ada Ogochukwu Ehi, singer.
- Oba Saheed Ademola Elegushi, traditional ruler
- Jennifer Eliogu, actress.
- Desmond Elliot, actor, producer and politician.
- Tara Fela-Durotoye, celebrity make-up artist
- Yusuf Haroun, medical doctor
- Annie Macaulay-Idibia, actress
- Mudashiru Obasa, Speaker of the Lagos State House of Assembly.
- Tajudeen Obasa, member of the National Assembly
- Tunde Obe
- Angela Okorie, Nigerian actress
- Olaide Olaogun, Nigerian film actress and model.
- Yinka Olukunga, actress
- Cossy Orjiakor, actress, singer, socialite
- Tope Oshin, Nigerian television and film director.
- Ruggedman, rapper
- Rukky Sanda, actress
- Sound Sultan, singer and songwriter (1976–2021)
- Dolly Unachukwu, actress
- Farida Waziri, former EFCC chairman
- Wizkid, singer and songwriter
- Sodiq Abubakar Yusuf, singer
- Lolo1, radio presenter
- Bryan Okwara, model and actor
- Michael Ekwemalor, businessman

== Library ==
The Lagos State University Library is also known as the Fatiu Ademola Akesode Library. It was established along with the institution and started its operation in 1983.

The units or departments, in the library include:

- Readers Services
- Technical services
- Collection Development
- Reference services
- E-library (Online) services
- Circulation department

== Notable faculty ==
- Fatiu Ademola Akesode
- Charles Ayo
- Robert Ajayi Boroffice
- Sola Fosudo
- Yemi Osinbajo

== Achievements ==
- Lagos State University was ranked as the second best University in Nigeria in the 2021 Times Higher Education World University Rankings. It ranked between 501 and 600 in the 2021 World University Rankings, and between 801 and 1000 in the 2021 Impact Rankings.
- In 2022, the university produced a law student with a CGPA of 5.0.
- In the 2024 AD Scientific Index Ranking, LASU was named the best state university in Nigeria for the third consecutive year.
- 2025: Lagos State University received 79,000 first-choice applications in the Unified Tertiary Matriculation Examination (UTME), making it the most-chosen university in Nigeria.

== Gallery ==
Lagos State University campus

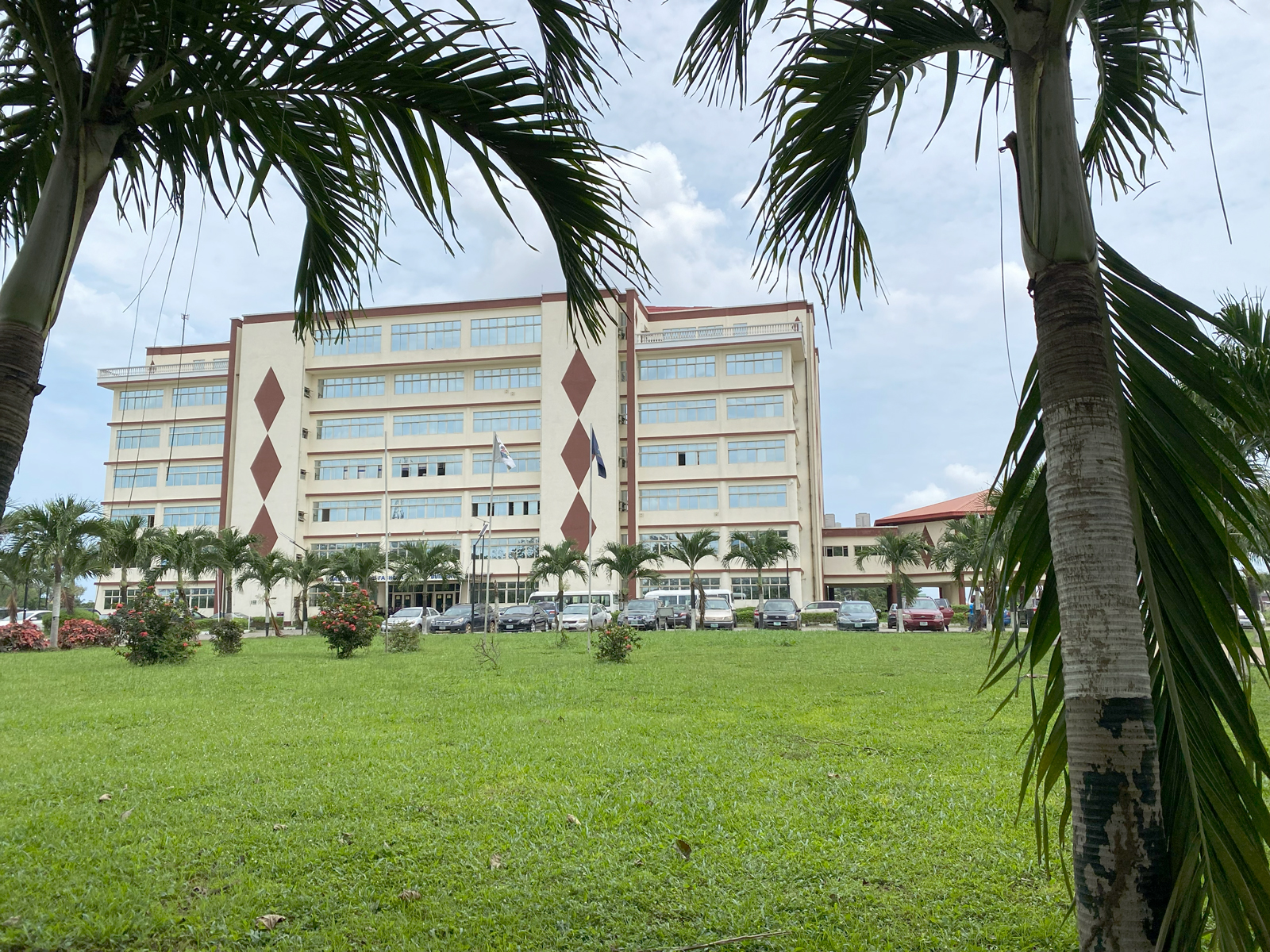
Senate building

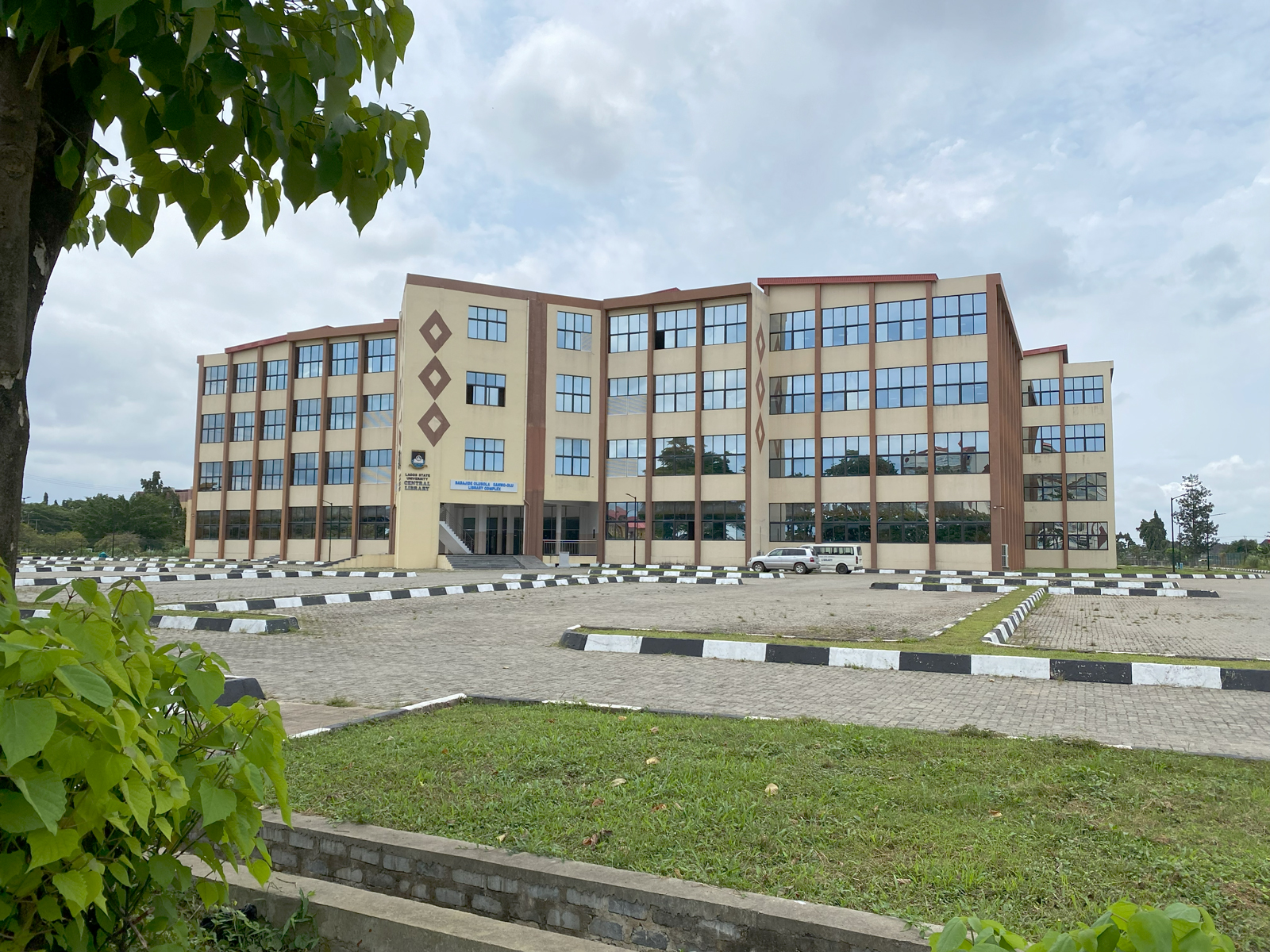
Babajide Olusola Sanwo-Olu Library Complex

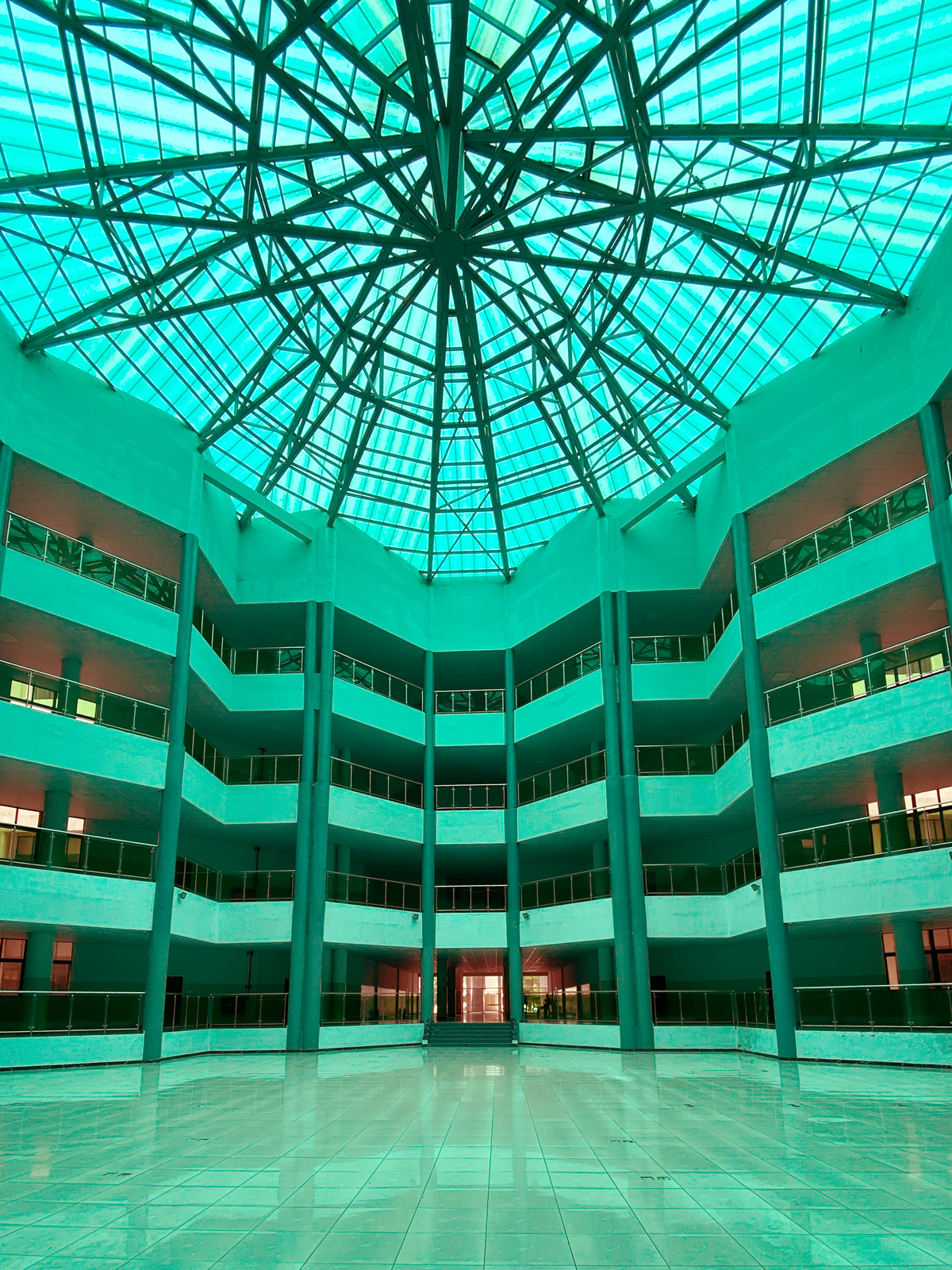
Babajide Olusola Sanwo-Olu Library Complex

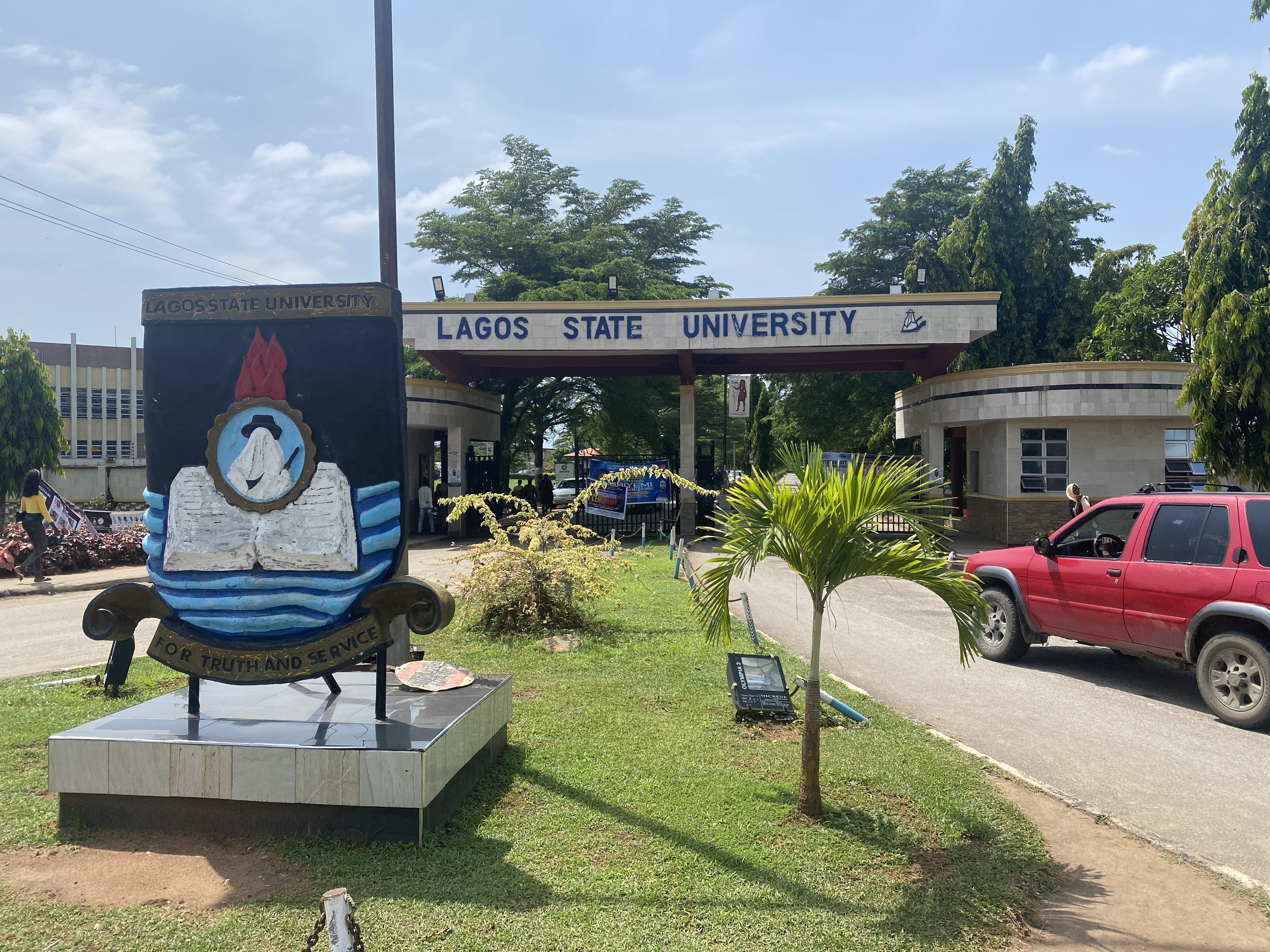
University gate

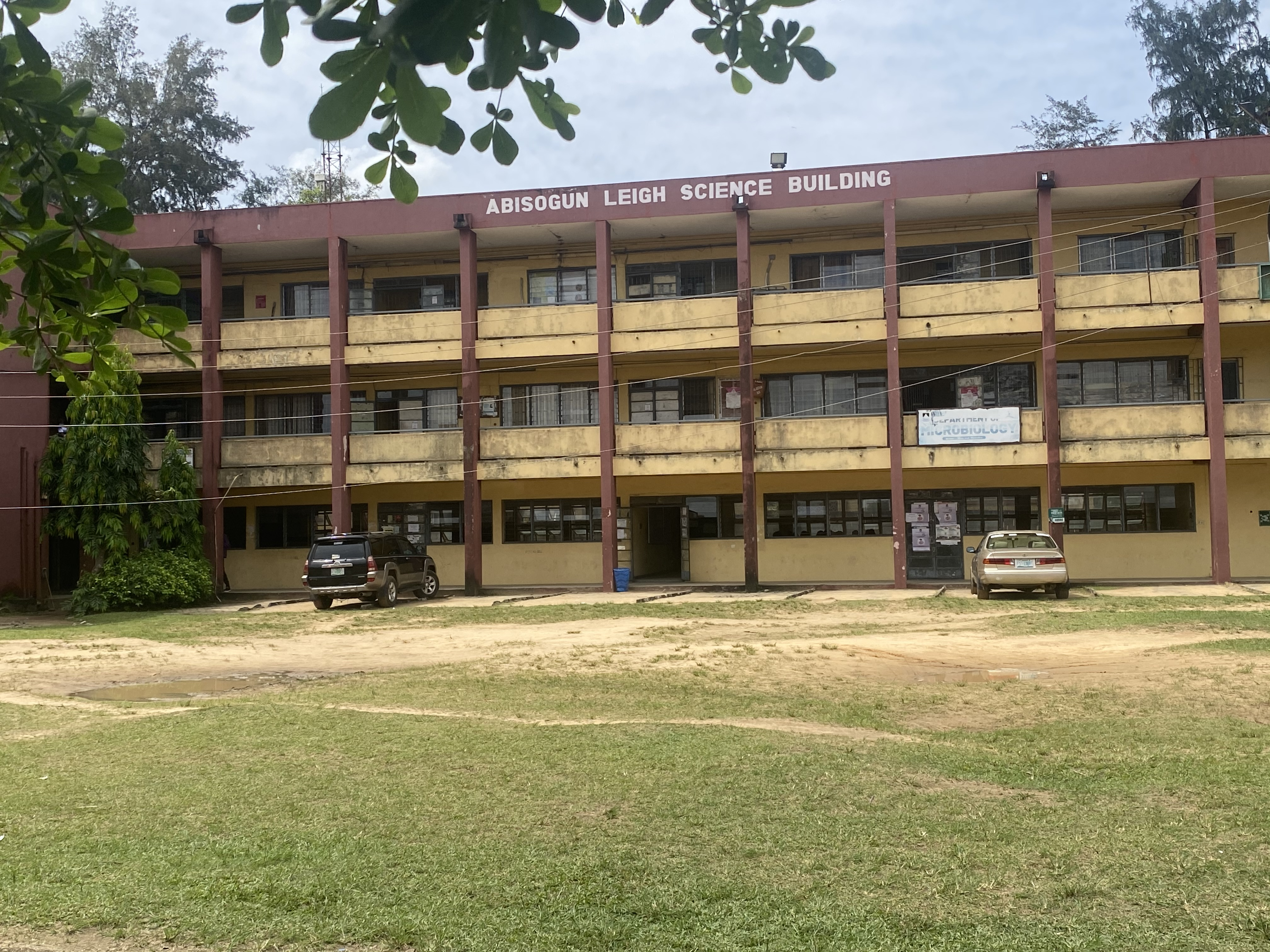
Abisogun Leigh science building

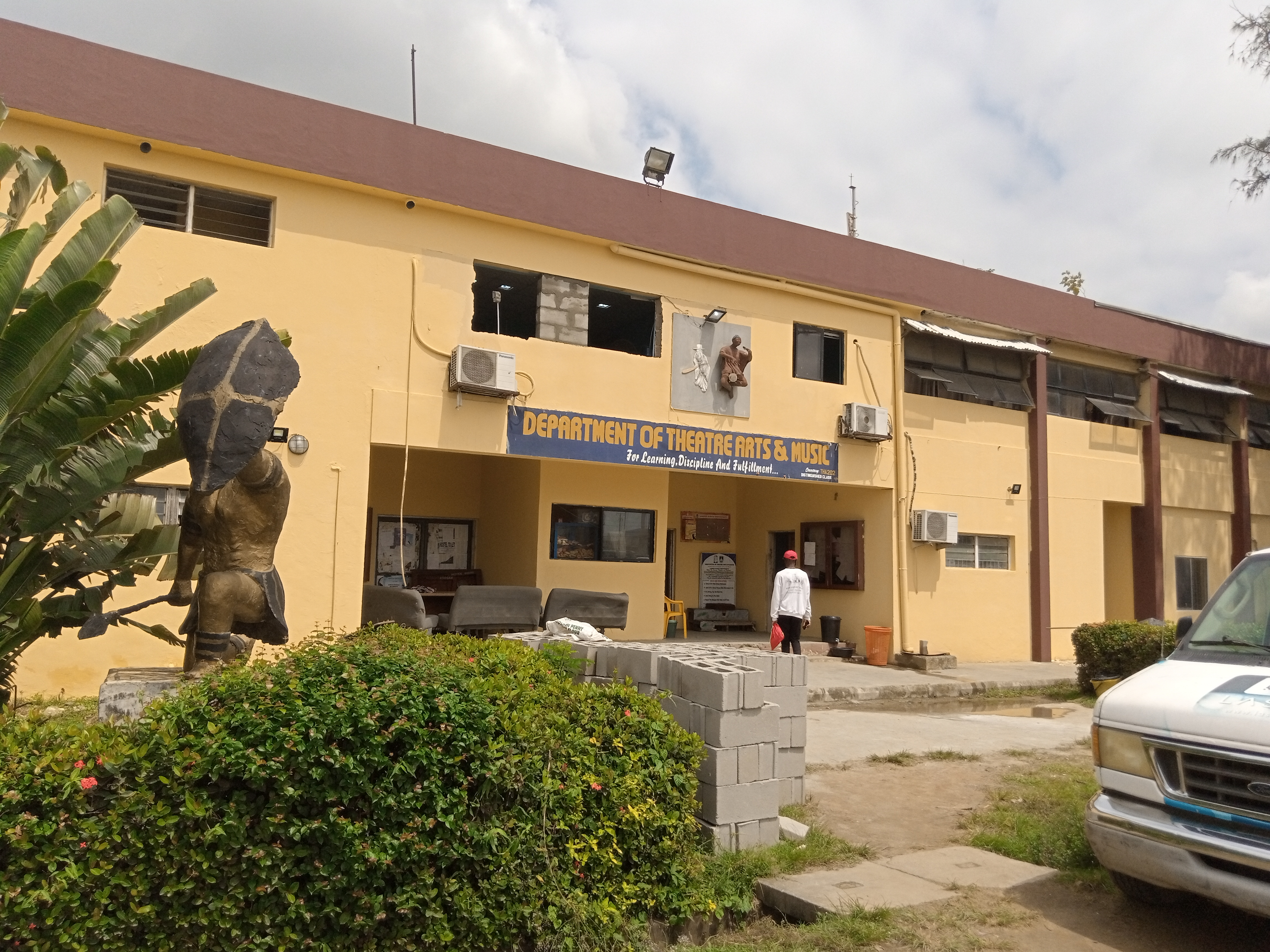
Department of Theater, Art and Music

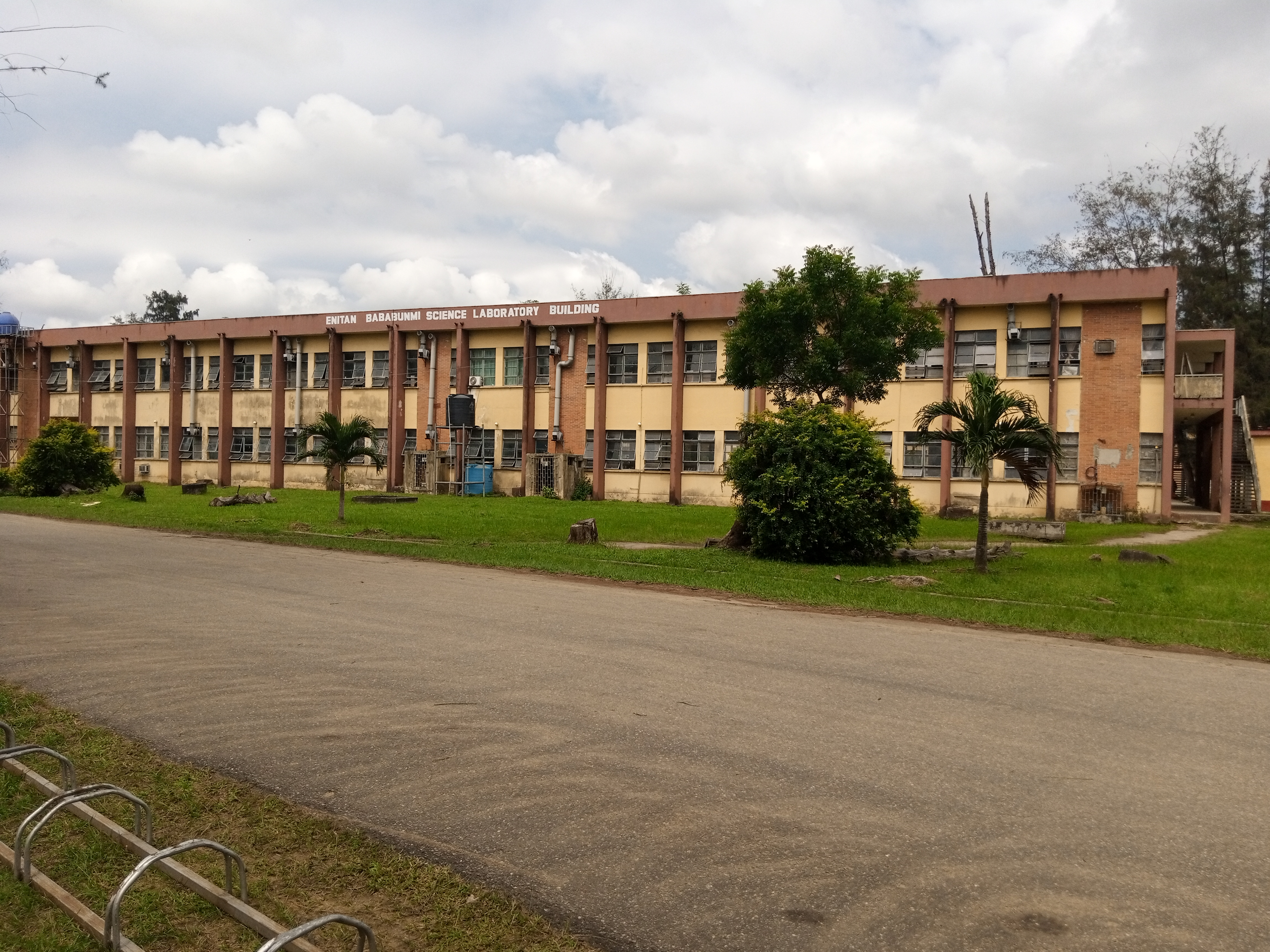
Enitan Bababunmi science laboratory

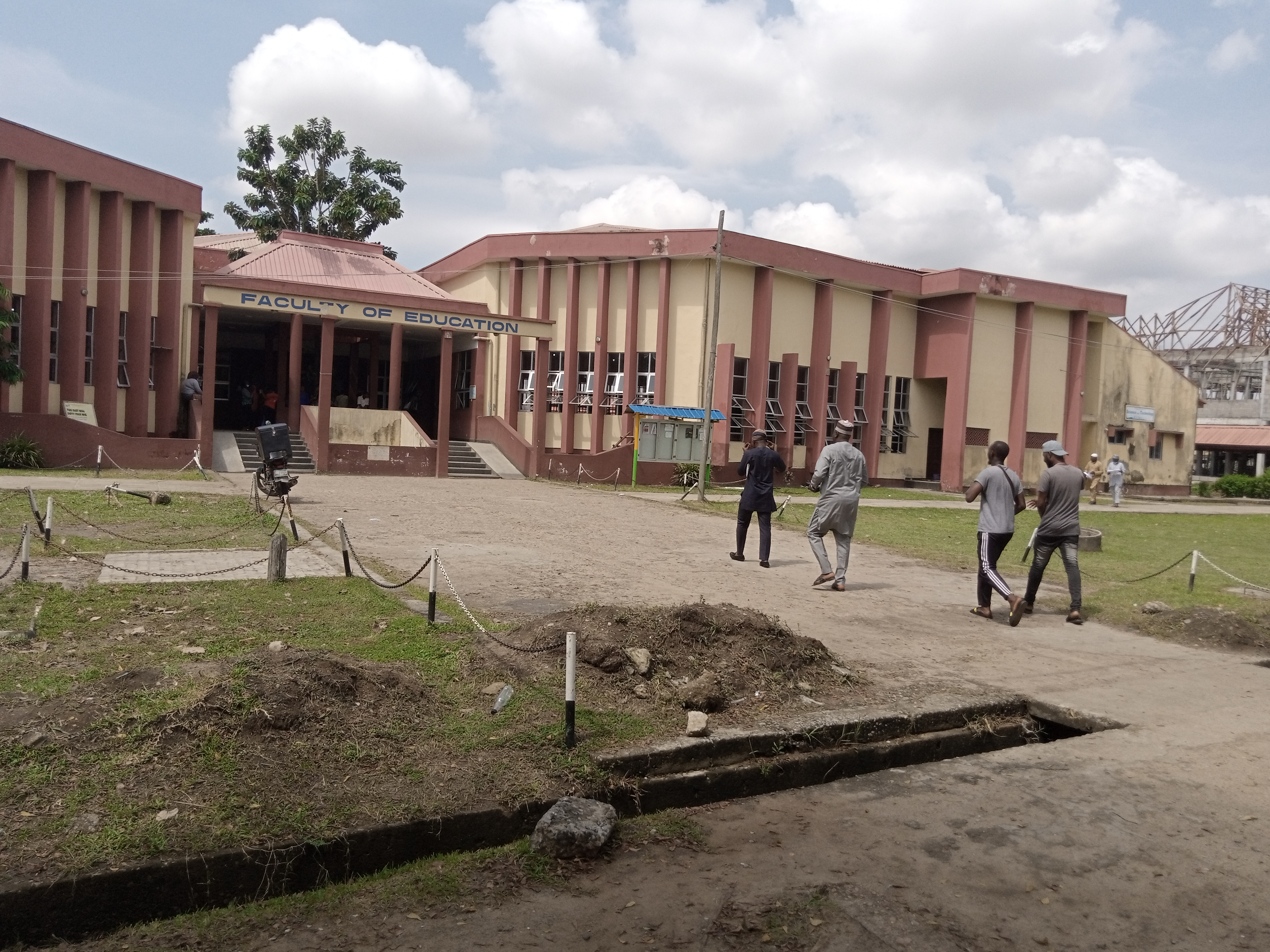
Faculty of Education

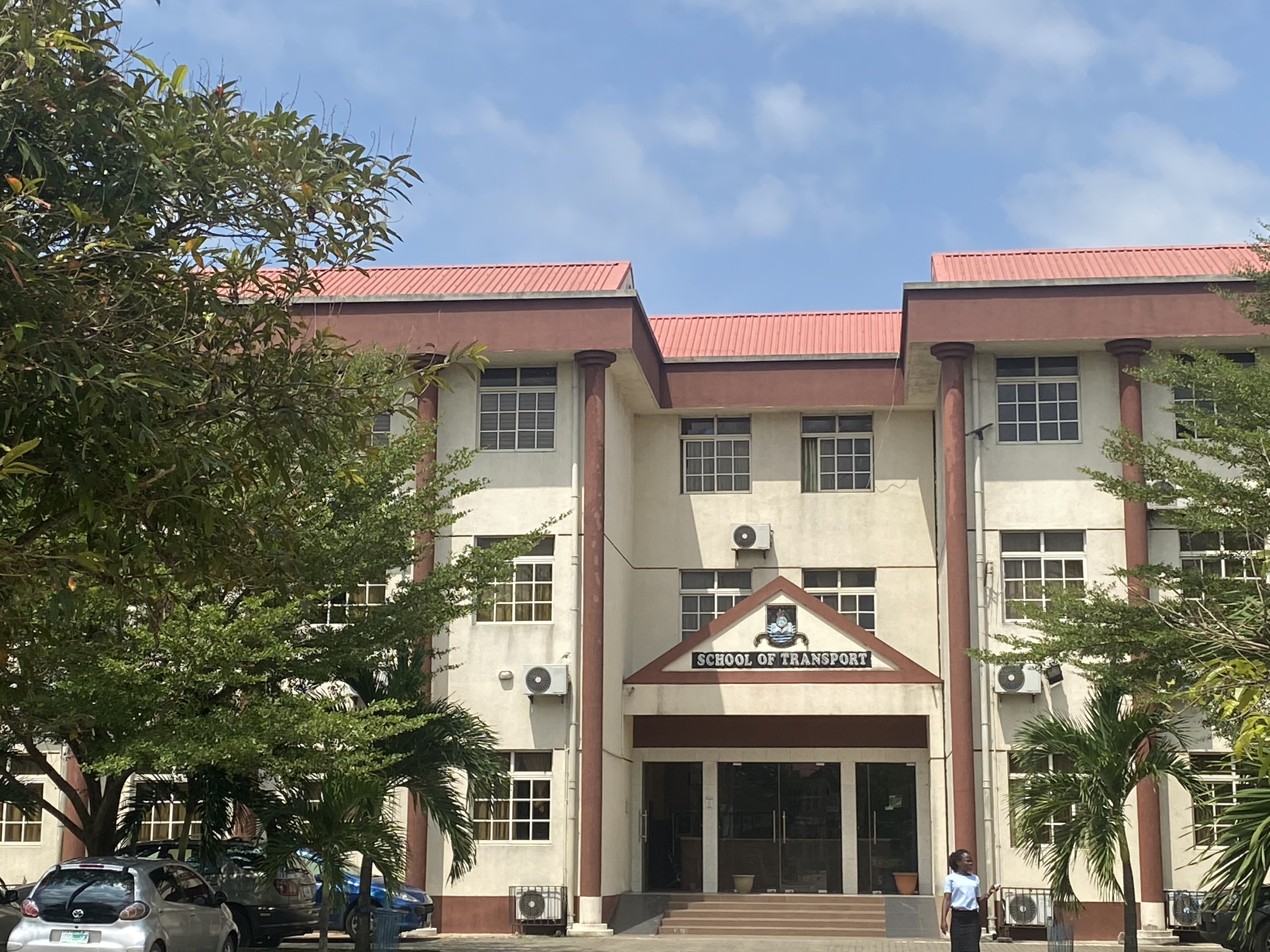
School of Transport

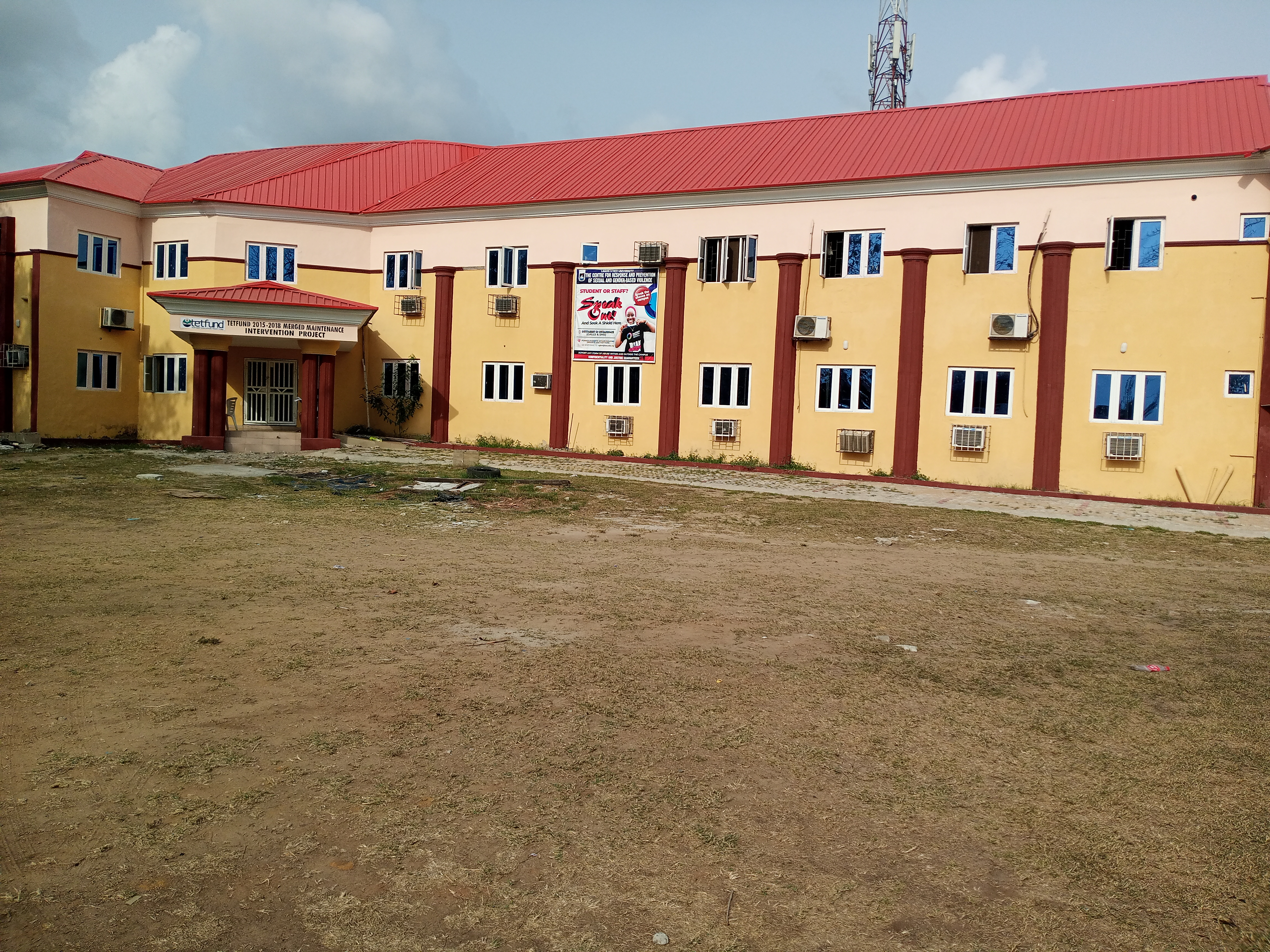
Response centre for sexual and Gender based violence

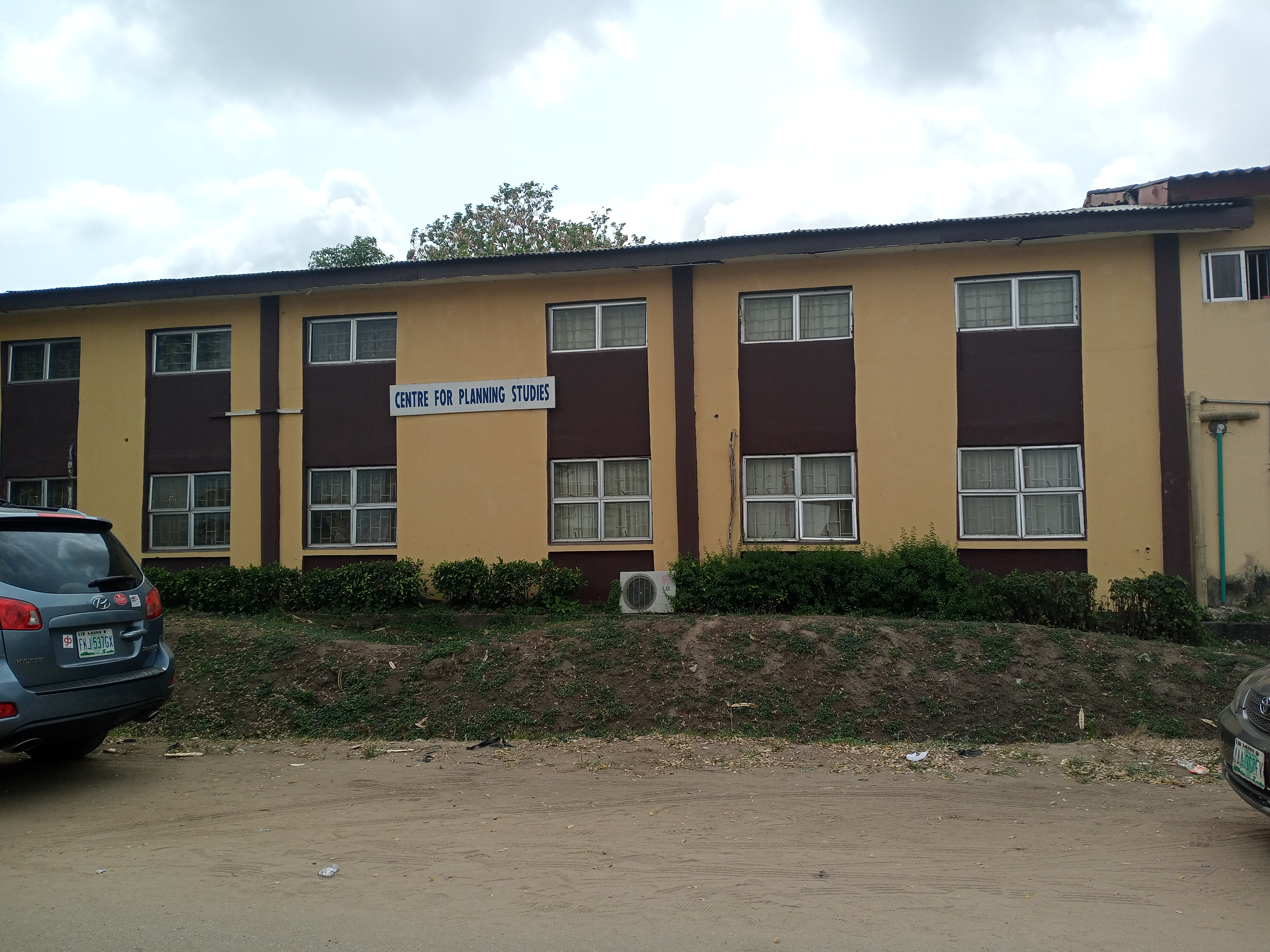
Center for planning

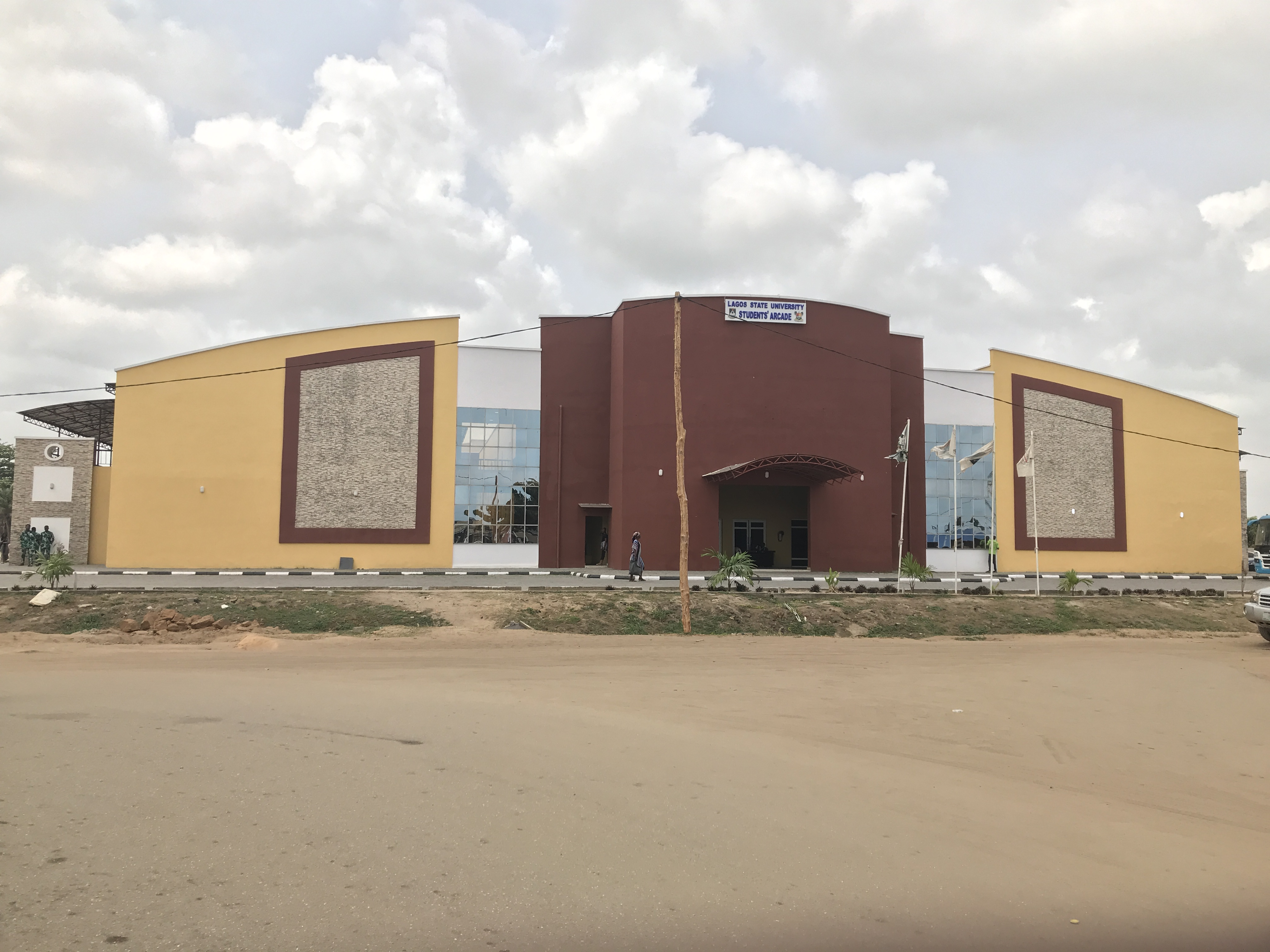
Students' Arcade

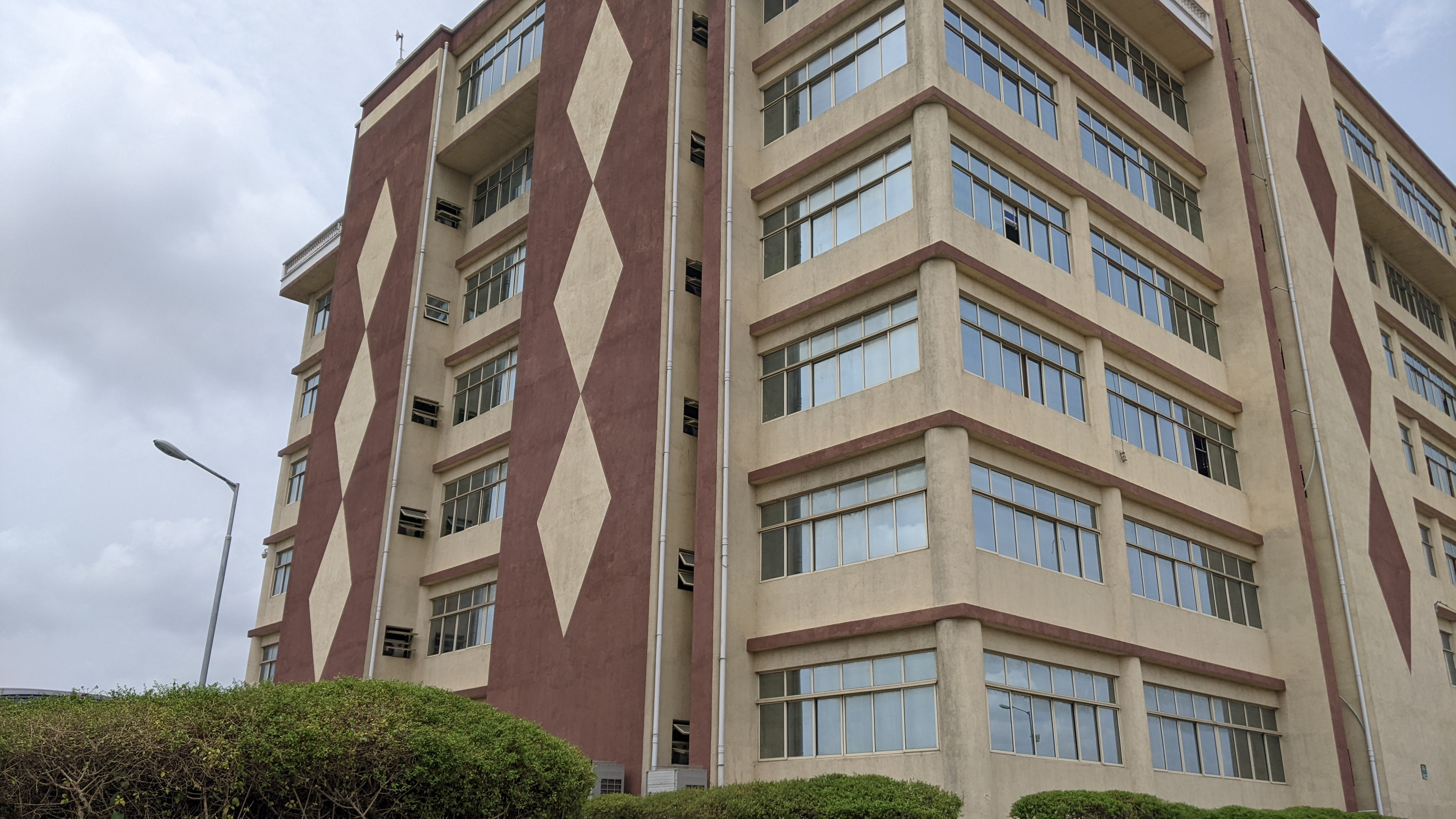
Senate Building

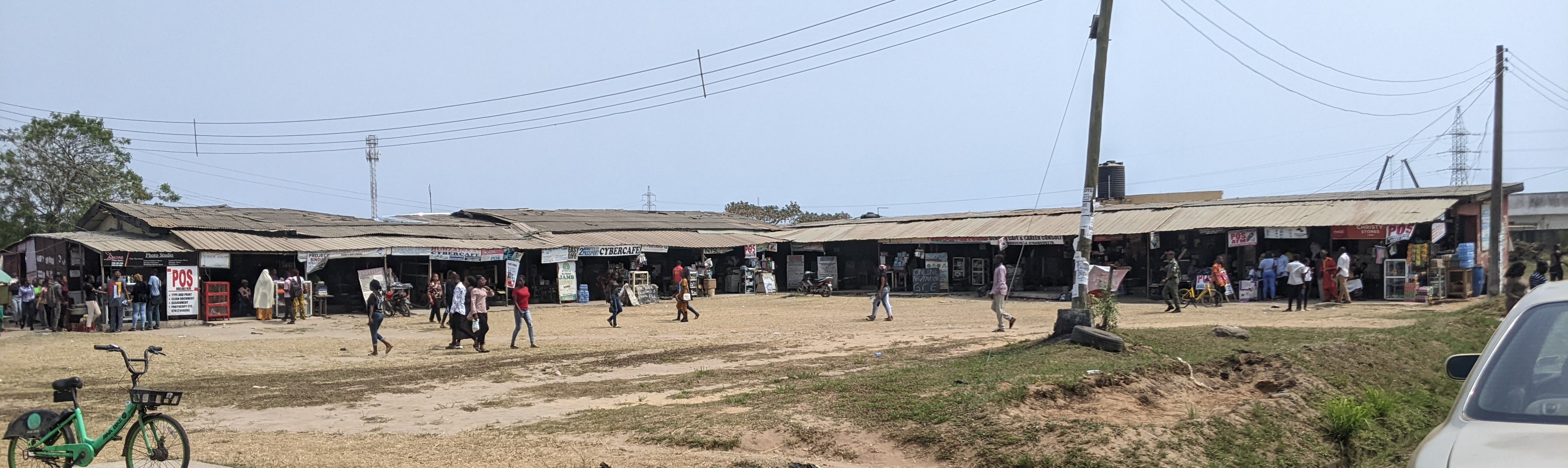
ECO Market

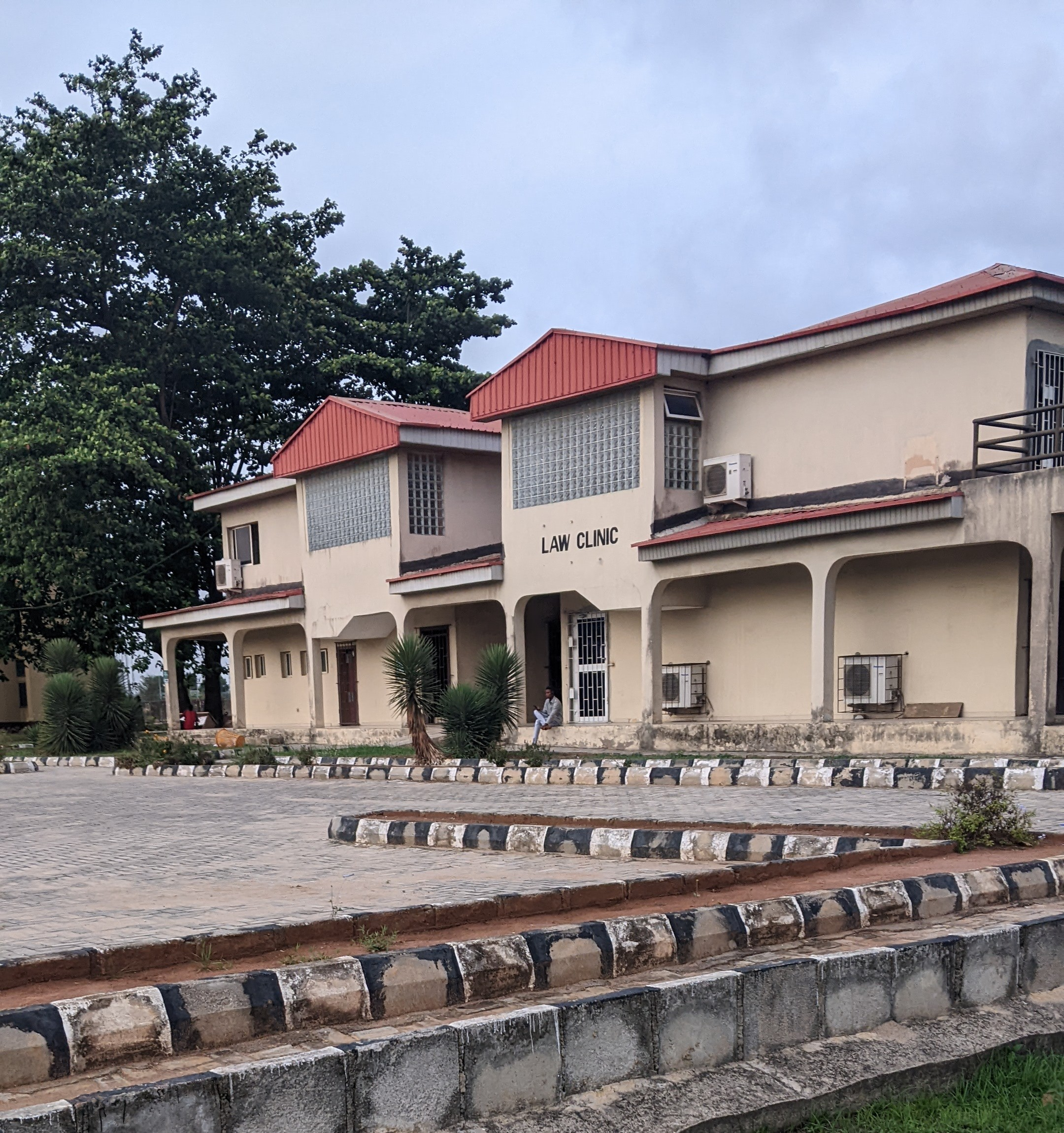
Law Clinic Ojo

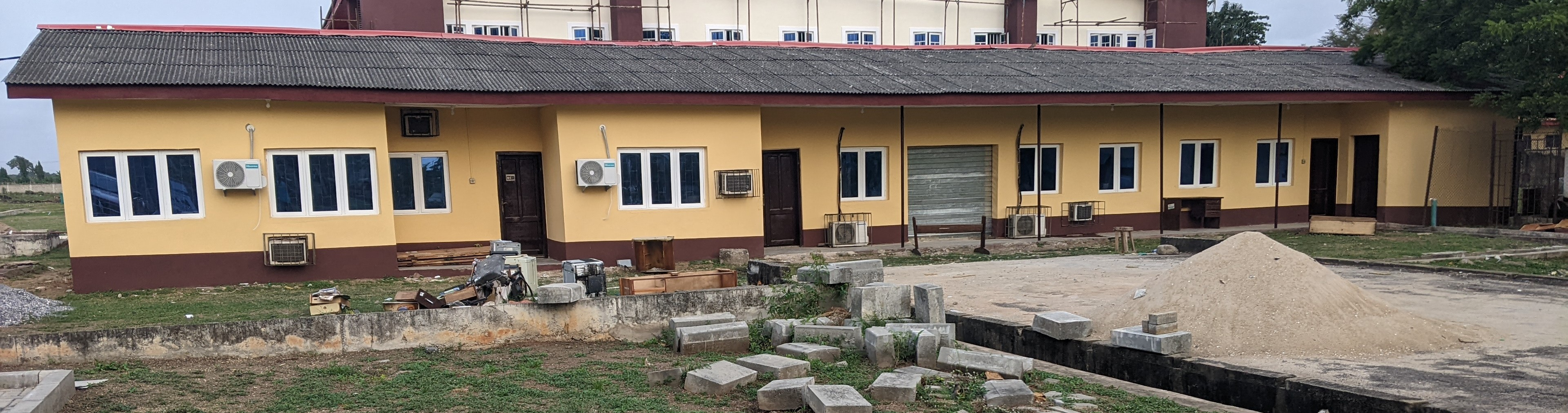
Main Printing Press Building

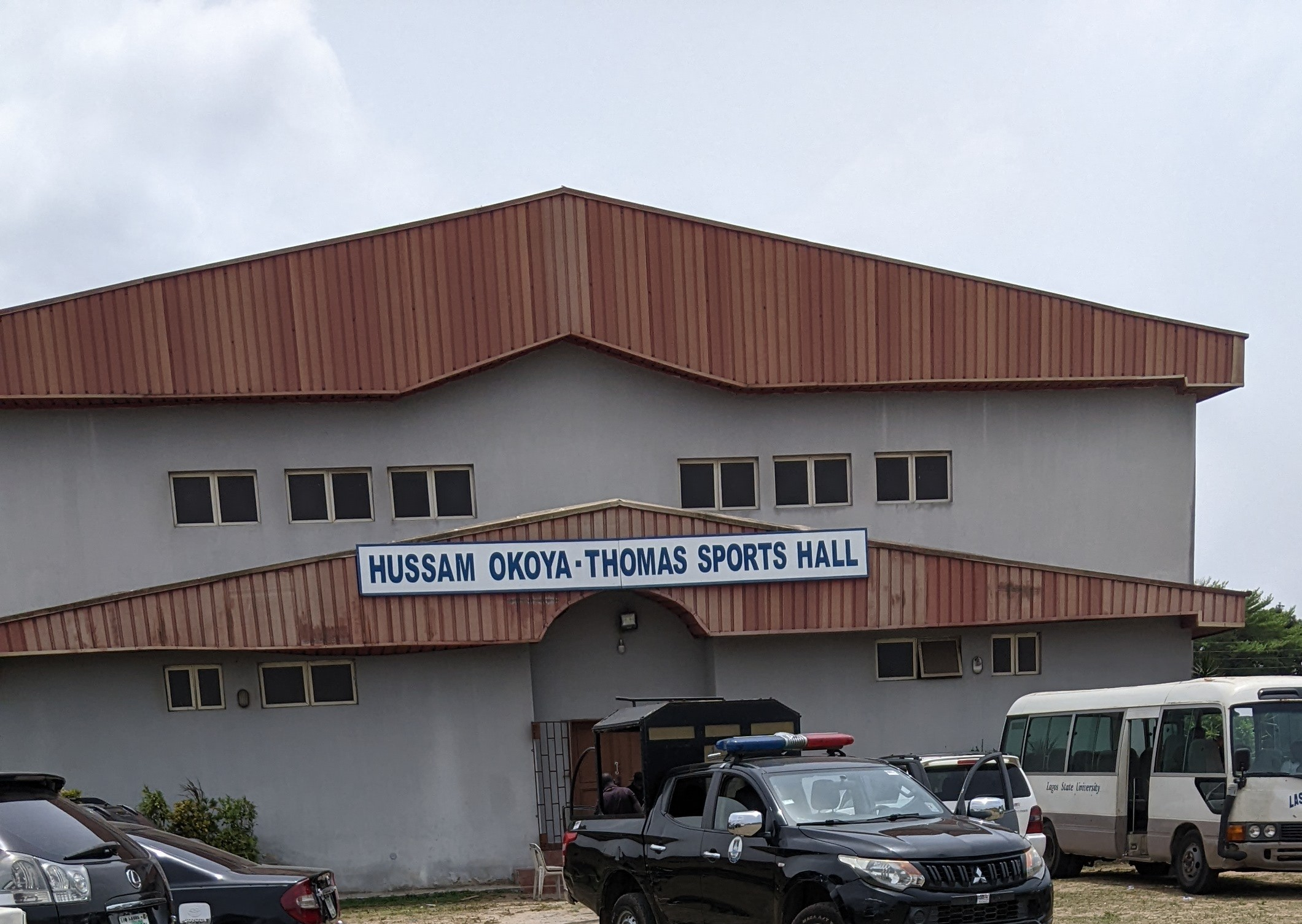
Okoya-Thomas Sports Hall
