= Oyingbo Market =

Market in Lagos, Nigeria

- Entrance to the modern Oyingbo market
- Constructed: 1991
- Completed: March 15, 2015
- Location: Ebute Metta, Lagos, Nigeria
- Interactive map of Oyingbo Market
- Coordinates: 6.481987°N 3.386301°E

Oyingbo market is a market complex located in the Ebute Metta area of Lagos State. The market is one of the busiest markets in Lagos, thereby contributing a large quota to the economy of the state. Oyingo serves thousands of customers daily.

== Location ==
The name Oyingbo comes from the Yoruba phrase eyin gbongbo, shortened to eyin gbo. Literally, the phrase means "behind the huge tree root" and was used to describe the market's location.

The modern-day market is located in the neighbourhood of Ebute Metta in Lagos State. It is located opposite from the First African Church Mission. The centre of the market is along the road from Somolu to Mushin and Mushin to Apapa.

== History ==
Oyingbo market was established during the early 1920s by the Awori people around Apapa road. It was originally managed by the Market Department of Lagos Town Council. The market expanded rapidly, and by the 1930s, the market moved to its current location. Customers traveled to the market daily for meat, fruit, livestock, and other food items.

As of 1964, the old Oyingbo market had two department stores, a supermarket, a bank, a hotel, and hardware stores.

In the 1970s, management of the market switched to the Lagos Mainland Local Government. By 1991, the market had fallen into disrepair. Flooding and fires further exacerbated the issue, and the old Oyingbo market was demolished. In its place, a new market started to be built in November 1991.

Construction of the project took longer than expected. In 2007, one of Babatunde Fashola's campaign promises was to finish rebuilding Oyingbo market. The modernization project was not finished until March 15, 2015. The new Oyingbo market is based out of a four-story building on 504 square meters. The parking lot has a capacity for 150 cars, and there are approximately 700 shops in the complex.

In January 2026, Jubril Emilagba, Chairman of the Lagos Mainland Local Government Area, banned sleeping at Oyingbo market in the hopes to curb crime and increase safety.

The saying in Yoruba: Oja Oyingbo ko mo p’enikan o wa (transl. Oyingbo market does not recognise the absence of anyone) represents the market's large influence over Nigeria's biggest city.

== Products ==
Women selling fruit in Oyingbo market

Oyingbo market mainly offers foodstuffs, such as meat, fruit, and vegetables. A 2007 study in the Nigerian Journal of Horticultural Science found that, out of three large markets in Lagos, fruits are the cheapest at Oyingbo market. A 2017 study in Journal of Research in Forestry, Wildlife and Environment found that bushmeat was again the cheapest at Oyingbo, despite it being classified as an "urban market". The study speculated that urban consumers prefer their meat cut into smaller pieces, lowering the price.

In addition to food products, some women sell herbal remedies. Most herbs and roots are grown in the interior of Nigeria, especially around Ibadan, and the traders travel frequently to Oyo state to receive their products. After Oyingbo market's rebuilding in 2015, the herbal vendors received a permanent stall. Herbal contraceptives like Artemisia vulgaris and Grossypium arboreun are sold at Oyingbo.

== Sanitation ==
Oyingbo market has a long history with excess waste dumping and resulting sanitation issues. The market is frequently fined for excess waste pollution, subsequently shut down, and then reopened. Notable shut downs for waste-related issues have occurred in 2019, 2021, and 2022. Traders claim that shutting down the market prevents them from accessing their livelihood and earning an income for their families. However, Lagos Waste Management Authority (LAWMA) and the local Ìyál'ọ́jàs claim that allowing the market to continue in unsanitary conditions would cause more harm.

A 2024 study by Journal of the Management Scientists found that 75.4% of traders at Oyingbo felt that the government provided "sufficient sanitary facilities and equipment" but 63% said that the waste management was "insufficient". Over half of traders said that the waste collection services were not prompt and over 97% said that their drainage systems were blocked with waste.

A woman selling ponmo in Oyingbo market

In 2024, each stall owner paid ₦500 monthly for waste disposal services. Cleaners came to the market three times a day, before each new session of traders. On Thursdays, there was mandatory government sanitation and fines for unsanitary conditions were levied. Bathroom facilities were cleaned by a third-party.

Compared to other markets in Nigeria and Lagos, Oyingbo market consistently had the worst sanitary conditions. A 2018 survey of Norovirus in periwinkles in Lagos markets found that compared to Ikotun market, Oyingbo market had the higher incidence of the disease. The periwinkles have also been found to have unsafe limits of copper. Another study found that vegetables from Oyingo had pesticide residue above the WHO upper limit. The biggest issue was with Telfairia occidentalis, which had a pesticide residue level of 2.35mg/kg. Pesticides found in the vegetable tissues include dicamba, bromacil, endofulsan, and oxamyl. Kola nuts from Oyingbo had the highest amount of pesticides from a group of Lagos markets, containing Zinc, copper, lead, and cadmium.

=== Timeline ===
In 2021, Folashade Tinubu-Ojo closed the market after a failure to pay a fine of ₦5 million for unsanitary conditions. Some traders claimed this was a bribe and expressed anger over their food products rotting inside their stalls while the market was closed. In September 2022, the market was temporarily shut down by Lagos Waste Management Authority (LAWMA) for excessive waste pile-up and more generally, poor waste management. Some traders were reported to continue to sell merchandise on the roadside outside the market illegally. The market was reopended in October 2023.

In June 2026, market traders again complained about the growing piles of waste at the market. The piles of waste impeded walkways and trading spaces. The food waste had attracted pests and emits an unpleasant odor, deterring customers from stalls. The Nigerian federal government claims unsanitary food preparations cause 53,000 deaths and 50 million illnesses annually in Nigeria.

LAWMA later came in to clear waste piles, following a month of complaints from traders. Frequnters of Oyingbo market said they hoped that LAWMA could come more regularly.

In October 2026, HBM Nigeria PIc and FABE International Foundation visited Oyingbo market on World Cleanup Day to improve sanitary conditions and sustainable practices there. They taught market traders about separating organic and plastic waste, provided waste bins, and other necessities. Ìyál'ọ́jà Olateju Ramot expressed gratitude for the programming.

== See also ==
- List of markets in Lagos
