= Igando =

Community in Lagos State, Nigeria

Coordinates: 6.54994°N 3.24662°E

- Community
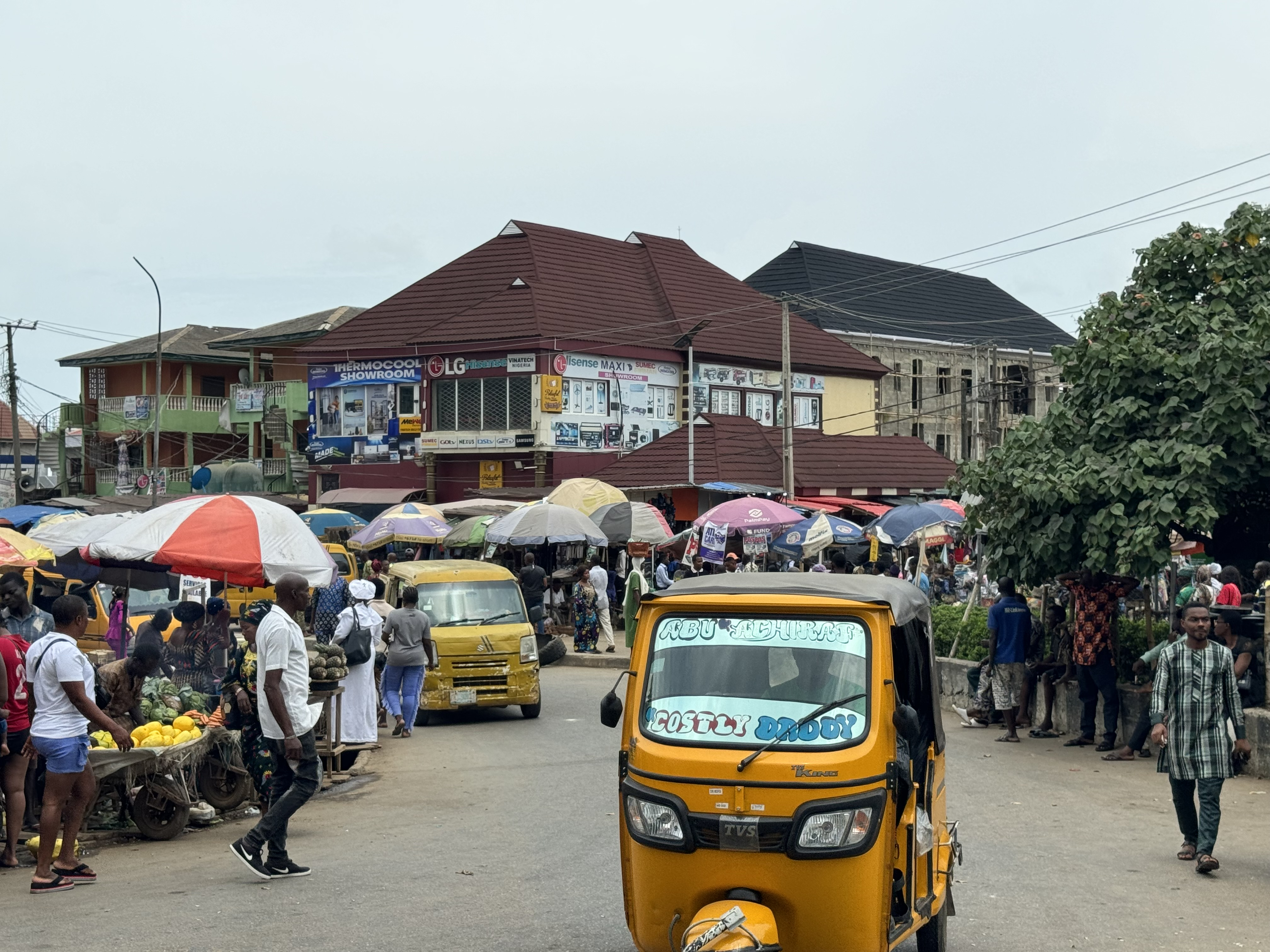
- Igando bus-stop (June 2024)

- Location of Igando in Lagos State, Nigeria
- State: Lagos State
- Local Government Area: Alimosho

Government
  - Governor: Babajide Sanwo-Olu PDP
- Time zone: UTC+1 (CET)
  - Summer (DST): UTC+1 (CEST)
- Postal Code: 102213

Igando also known as Igando road is a community located in the Alimosho local government area of Lagos State, South-Western Nigeria. On the 26 July 2016, suspected Niger Delta militants invaded the town, killing several people and destroying property. Alimosho General Hospital is located along the Igando road leading to Isheri egbeda road.

== Geography ==
Igando is a busy area in Lagos State due to its popular local markets and road dimension which leads to Iyana-Iba, Isheri Egbeda road and Ikotun. Along the road leading from the Igando bus-stop to Ikotun is where the Igando Community High School is located. The Lagos Bus Rapid Transit System is also located at the bus-stop of Igando.

=== Market ===
It is surrounded with local markets being called Igando market, well known in the city of Alimosho, Lagos state.

== Education ==
- Igando Community High School

== See also ==
- List of markets in Lagos
