= Air pollution in Nigeria =

Air pollution in Nigeria is a major environmental and public health issue caused primarily by vehicle emissions, industrial activities, open burning, and the use of solid fuels for cooking. Urban centers such as Lagos, Abuja, and Kano experience high concentrations of pollutants, leading to increased respiratory illnesses and premature deaths. According to the World Bank, the economic cost of air pollution in Lagos alone was estimated at over $2 billion in 2018. Despite existing environmental policies, enforcement remains weak, and rapid urbanization continues to worsen air quality across the country.

== Causes of air pollution in Nigeria ==
Some major causes of Air Pollution in Nigeria include the following:

=== Vehicle emissions ===
A large number of cars are outdated, badly maintained, and run on subpar gasoline. These vehicles release Carbon monoxide (CO) which is a poisonous gas, dangerous to people. Acid rain and smog are caused by nitrogen oxides (NOx). Particulate matter (PM): microscopic particles that damage the heart and lungs. Ground-level ozone is created when NOx and volatile organic compounds (VOCs) combine. One greenhouse gas that fuels climate change is carbon dioxide (CO_{2}).

Vehicle emissions are becoming a greater public health concern as a result of outdated vehicles, and subpar fuel standards. This is connected to an upsurge in respiratory infections in cities like Lagos, Abuja, and Kano.

=== Industrial emissions ===
The second cause of air pollution is industrial pollutants. High levels of pollution are found in commercial and industrial areas such as Apapa, Idumota, Ikeja, and Odogunyan, which are home to refineries, steel, cement, chemicals, and furniture businesses. Significant pollution is produced by factories, cement mills, refineries, and quarries.

Flaring of natural gas is a prevalent practice in the oil industry that releases CO_{2}, NO_{x}, and other pollutants. According to a study, ambient air pollution in Lagos State resulted in an estimated economic loss of approximately $2.1 billion in 2018. This figure represents around 2.1% of the state's Gross Domestic Product (GDP). The losses were attributed to the health impacts of air pollution, including increased illness rates and premature deaths, which affected workforce productivity and imposed additional burdens on healthcare systems.

== Impact ==
=== Air pollution ===
Air pollution is a serious public health issue in Nigeria, especially for young children (under five years old). Air pollution was blamed for an estimated 67,416 pneumonia related deaths in children under five in 2019. Household air pollution, mostly from indoor cooking and solid fuel consumption, was responsible for almost 78% of these pollution-related pneumonia deaths. Prolonged exposure to air pollution has also been linked to a higher risk of cardiovascular issues, cancer, and unfavorable pregnancy outcomes, as well as respiratory conditions like asthma and chronic obstructive pulmonary disease (COPD). According to studies, indoor pollution levels at some schools, especially those located in urban and industrial regions, may be higher than outdoor levels, which increases the health hazards for both staff and students.

== Challenges and gaps ==
- Many parts of Nigeria lack consistent, high-quality air quality monitoring stations, which makes it difficult to gather enough data for accurate assessment and policymaking.
- Weak policy implementation: Despite the existence of environmental and emission control policies, enforcement is still lax, and emission inventories are frequently out-of-date or poorly executed.
- Rapid urbanization and population growth: Cities are growing faster than infrastructure can handle, which increases emissions from industrial activity, vehicles, and construction.
- Electricity shortages: Frequently occurring power outages lead to a widespread reliance on diesel and gasoline generators, which greatly raises urban air pollution levels.
