= Alimosho =

LGA in Lagos State, Nigeria

Alimosho Alimoso
- LGA and neighborhood
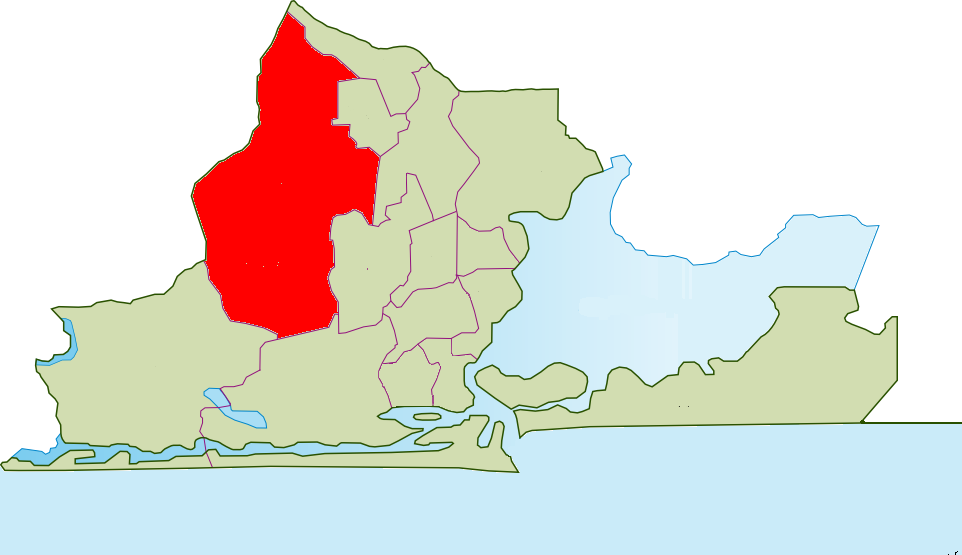
- Location within Lagos Metropolitan Area
- Interactive map of Alimosho
- Coordinates: 6°36′38″N 3°17′45″E
- Country: Nigeria
- State: Lagos State

Government
  - Local Government Chairman and the Head of the Local Government Council: Hon. Akinpelu Ibrahim Johnson

Population (2006)
  - Total: 1,288,714 (official census figure) or 2,047,026 (claimed by Lagos State Government) (1st) in Lagos State
- Time zone: UTC+1 (WAT)
- Postal code: 234
- Area code: 01
- Website: www.alimosho.lg.gov.ng

Alimosho is a neighborhood of Lagos and a Local Government Area in Lagos State, Nigeria with the largest population of about 4,082,900 which is according to Population [2019] – Projection The 2006 Census says the population was 1,288,714 (but the Lagos State Government argued that the population as at 2006 within the LGA was more than 2 million residents).

It has now been subdivided between several Local Community Development Areas (LCDA). The LCDA restructuring kicked off after the administration of Bola Ilori, who was the last chairman of the old single Alimosho Local Government. The six sub-divisions created out of the old Alimosho are: Agbado/Oke-Odo LCDA, Ayobo/Ipaja LCDA, Alimosho LG, Egbe/Idimu LCDA, Ikotun/Igando LCDA and Mosan Okunola LCDA. The LGA contains the urban area of Egbeda/Akowonjo.

The Alimosho was established in 1945 and it was under the (then) western region. Alimosho's population is predominantly the Egba and Egbado Yoruba people. The area is rich in culture, prominent amongst which are the Oro, Igunnu and Egungun annual festivals. The main religions are Islam, Christianity, and the Yoruba religion. Yoruba language is widely spoken in the community.

The first secretariat of Alimosho is a two-storey building located on Council street, now in the Egbe/Idimu LCDA. it is said that the LGA is the noisiest in Lagos State.

== Economy ==
The economy of Alimosho Local Government Area revolves significantly around commerce, supported by prominent markets like the Ilé-epo market, Katangowa market, Ikotun market, Igando multi-purpose market, and Akesan market, which draw large crowds of buyers and sellers daily. Additionally, the area hosts various private and public institutions including hotels and banks, contributing to its economic landscape.

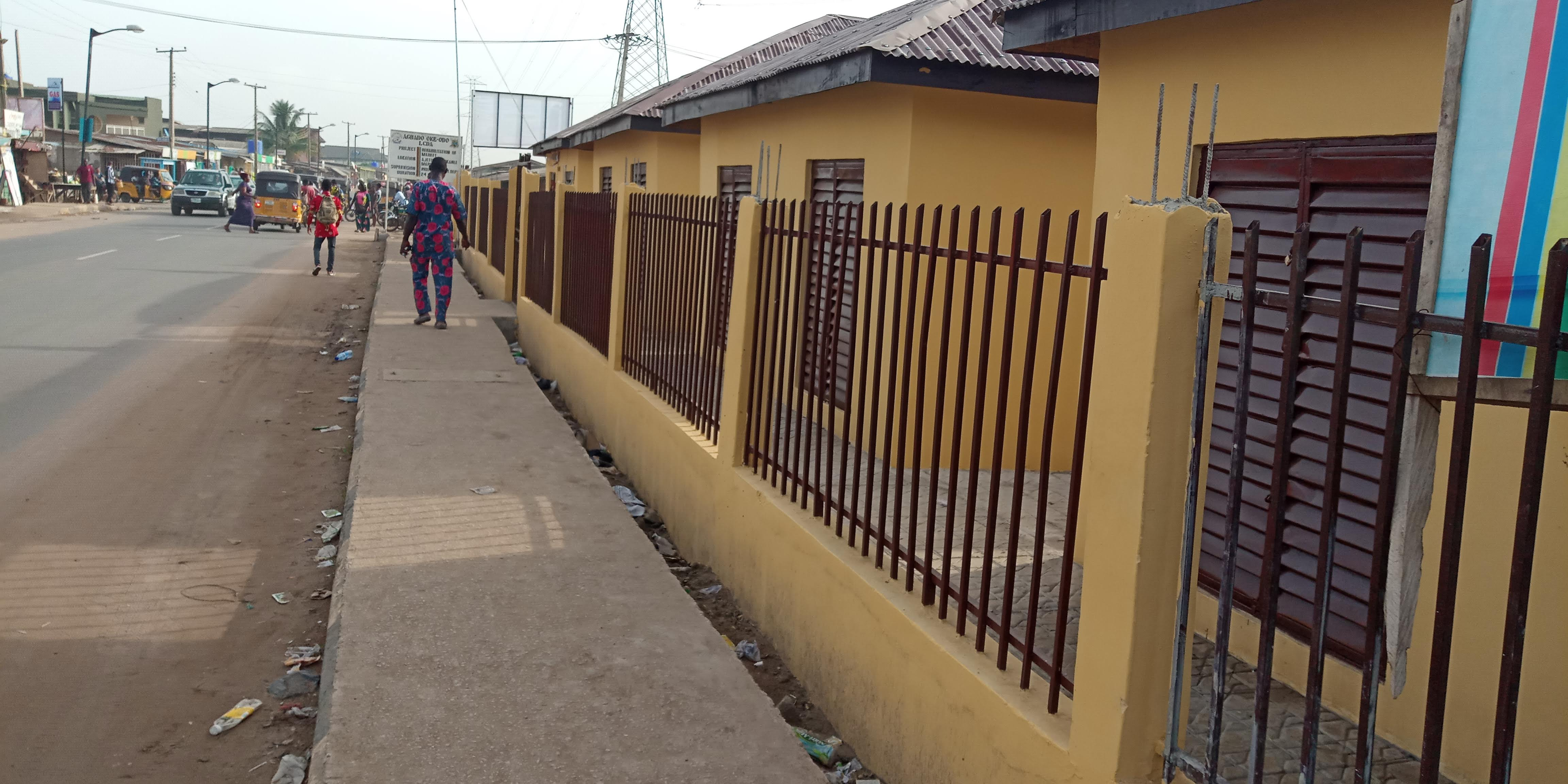
Amikanle Market

== Traditional and royal institutions ==
Alimosho Local Government Area is home to a number of traditional institutions that reflect the Yoruba heritage of its predominantly Egba and Awori populations. These institutions are headed by recognised traditional rulers (Obas), Baales (community heads), and chiefs, who play important cultural and advisory roles within their respective communities.

In recent years, the Lagos State Government has continued to formalise and recognise traditional leadership within the area. For instance, in 2022, official instruments of authority (staffs of office) were presented to Oba Akeeb Rauf Adebowale, the Alaye of Orisumbare land, and Oba Nojeem Ajolojuota Lawal, the Alaye of Oke Abiye land while in 2024 the scepter of authority was presented to Oba Ibrahim Olasunkanmi Lawal-Bello, the King of Isheri Olofin Kingdom, reinforcing the role of royal institutions in grassroots governance.

Beyond recognised monarchs, the traditional structure in Alimosho also includes Baales and community chiefs who serve at the ward and neighborhood levels, maintaining customary authority and acting as intermediaries between residents and government institutions. These institutions are closely linked to the cultural life of the area, including festivals such as Oro, Igunnu, and Egungun, which are integral to Yoruba religious and social traditions in Alimosho.

Name	Title	Domain/Community	Ref
Oba Lasisi Gbadamosi	Onigando of Igando	Igando	
Oba Ibrahim Olasunkanmi Lawal-Bello	Oba of Isheri-Olofin	Isheri-Olofin	
Oba Hammed Orelope Laka	Elegbeda of Egbeda	Egbeda	
Oba Nojeemdeen Abidemi Aberejo	Alakesan of Akesan	Akesan	
Oba Kolawole Ajani Egundipe	Onipaja of Ipaja	Ipaja	
Oba Akeeb Rauf Adebowale	Alaye of Orisunbare	Orisunbare	
Oba Babatunde Ogunronbi	Onishasha of Shasha	Shasha	
Oba Nureini Olomitutu	Onijegun of Ijegun	Ijegun	
Oba Azeez Gbadabiu Asiwaju	Onikotun of Ikotun	Ikotun	

== Football ==
Alimosho is home to the Seamoriow Football Club, which is based at the Seamoriow Sports Complex. The club participates in local competitions and contributes to grassroots football development in Lagos State.
