= Afang =

Afang may refer to:

- Epang Palace, or Afang Palace
- Gnetum africanum, or Afang, a vine
- Afang (soup)
