= Mushin Olosha =

Community in Lagos State, Nigeria

Mushin Olosha is a community within the Mushin Local Government Area of Lagos State, Nigeria. It is recognized for its vibrant markets, cultural heritage, and active economic life. The area is a hub of commercial activities and has a rich cultural tapestry, reflecting the diverse population that resides there.

== History ==
Mushin Olosha has a historical significance that mirrors the broader history of Lagos State. Over the years, it has developed while maintaining its cultural importance among the Yoruba people and other ethnic groups. The community's evolution is indicative of the dynamic changes that have characterized Lagos State, especially post-independence.

== Economy ==
The economy of Mushin Olosha is predominantly driven by commerce. The community boasts several vibrant markets. Ojuwoye Market is prominent for its wide range of affordable goods. Other significant markets include Daleko Market, known for foodstuff, and Ladipo Market, which is famous for automotive spare parts. Additionally, Mushin Olosha is home to various privately and publicly owned institutions, including hotels and banks, contributing to its economic vibrancy.

== Education and facilities ==
Mushin Olosha features numerous educational institutions ranging from primary schools to secondary schools, providing quality education and contributing to the area's intellectual development.

== Cultural and social life ==
Mushin Olosha is culturally rich, with a mix of various ethnic groups such as the Yoruba, Igbo, and Hausa. This diversity is evident in the cultural events and festivals celebrated in the area, contributing to its rich cultural heritage.

The social life in Mushin Olosha is marked by various cultural activities and a bustling nightlife. Residents and visitors can enjoy several entertainment options, including galleries, restaurants, bars, and nightclubs. The Ovuomaroro Gallery, owned by renowned Nigerian artist Professor Bruce Onobrakpeya, is a prominent cultural spot in the area.

== Notable landmarks ==
Mushin Olosha features several landmarks that highlight its cultural and historical significance:

- Mushin Olosha Central Mosque: A key place of worship and community gathering.
- Olosha Market Square: The central point for commercial activities and social interactions.
