= Kazeem Olayinka Muyideen =

Nigerian politician

Hon. Kazeem Olayinka Muyideen

Member, Lagos State House of Assembly
- Incumbent
- Assumed office 2019
- Constituency: Mushin Constituency II

Personal details
- Party: All Progressives Congress (APC)
- Occupation: Politician
- Website: Lagos Assembly Profile

Kazeem Olayinka Muyideen (also known as Olayinka Kazeem Esho) is a Nigerian politician who currently serves as a member of the Lagos State House of Assembly, representing Mushin Constituency II under the platform of the All Progressives Congress (APC).

== Political career ==
Before his election to the state legislature, Kazeem served in the executive arm of local government. In June 2016, he was appointed by the then-Governor of Lagos State, Akinwunmi Ambode, as the Sole Administrator of Mushin Local Government.

Kazeem Olayinka was first elected into the Lagos State House of Assembly in the 2019 general elections to represent Mushin Constituency II. He was re-elected for a second term in the 2023 general elections under the All Progressives Congress (APC).

In the 10th Assembly, he was appointed as the Chairman of the House Committee on Land Matters. In this capacity, he exercises oversight functions over the state's land administration agencies, including the New Towns Development Authority (NTDA).
