= List of Lagos State local government areas by population =

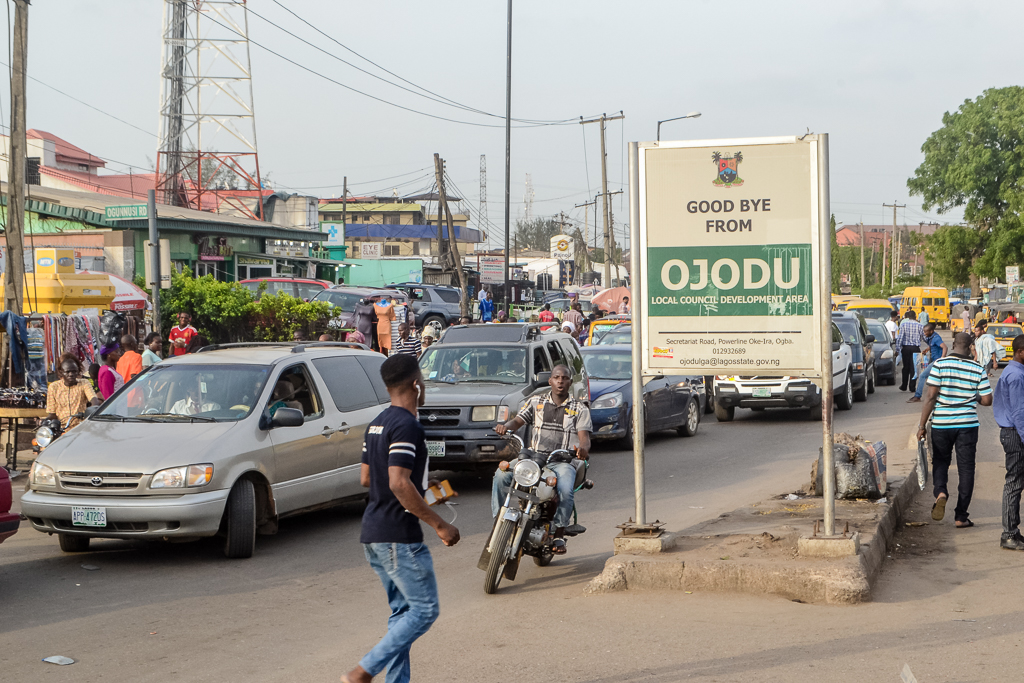

Lagos state is made up of five administrative divisions, namely, Ikorodu, Ikeja, Epe, Badagry, and Lagos Island, with Ikeja being the Capital. The five divisions consist of a total of 20 Local Government Areas and 37 Local Council Development Areas (LCDAs).

The LCDAs include Agbado/Oke-Odo, Agboyi-Ketu, Ayobo-Ipaja, Bariga, Eredo, Egbe-Idimu, Ejigbo, Igando-Ikotun, Ikosi-Isheri, Isolo, Mosan-Okunola, Odi Olowo-Ojuwoye, Ojodu, Ojokoro, Onigbongbo and Orile Agege.

| Rank | LGA | Population |
|---|---|---|
| 1 | Ajeromi-Ifelodun | 1,456,783 |
| 2 | Alimosho | 2,000,346 |
| 3 | Kosofe | 665,421 |
| 4 | Mushin | 633,543 |
| 5 | Oshodi-Isolo | 1,621,789 |
| 6 | Ojo | 598,336 |
| 7 | Ikorodu | 535,811 |
| 8 | Surulere | 504,409 |
| 9 | Agege | 461,123 |
| 10 | Ifako-Ijaiye | 428,812 |
| 11 | Somolu | 402,992 |
| 12 | Amuwo-Odofin | 500,576 |
| 13 | Lagos Mainland | 317,980 |
| 14 | Ikeja | 313,333 |
| 15 | Eti-Osa | 287,958 |
| 16 | Badagry | 241,437 |
| 17 | Apapa | 217,661 |
| 18 | Lagos Island | 209,665 |
| 19 | Epe | 181,715 |
| 20 | Ibeju-Lekki | 117,542 |
