= Ladipo Market =

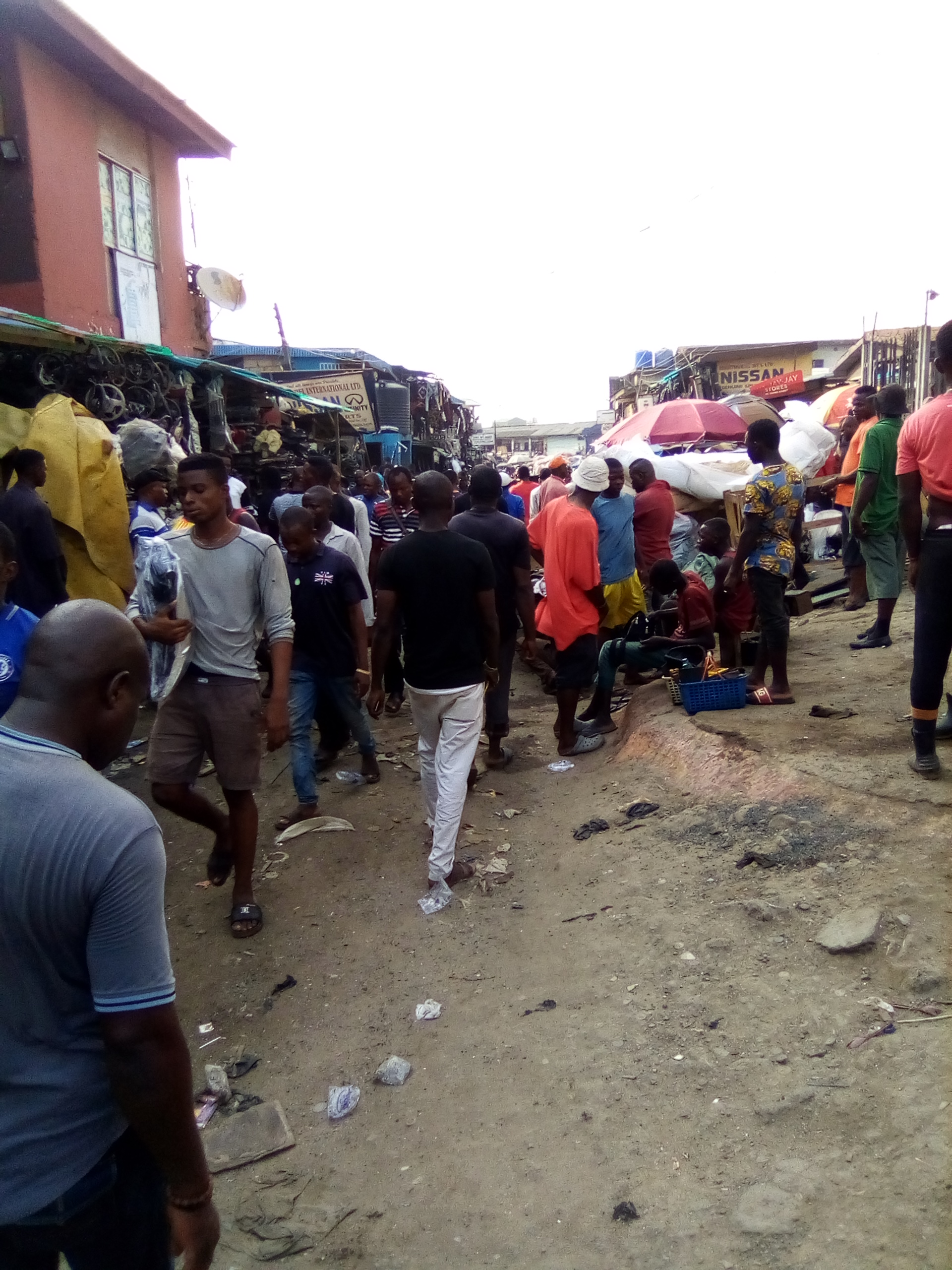
Lapido market view

Ladipo Market also known as Ladipo Auto Spare Parts Market is a market located in Mushin local Government area of Lagos State. In recent times, Ladipo Market has been the hub for political campaigns and social awareness gatherings due to the mass population of people in the market.

The market is situated at Ladipo Street, Papa Ajao, Mushin, Lagos. The name was derived from its location, Ladipo Street. Ladipo market is located around Akinwunmi Lane, off Ladipo Street, Papa Ajao, Mushin, Lagos. It is from this area (Ladipo Street) that it infers its name now acclaimed in car circles. It is entirely open when you are coming from various areas in Lagos or different objections outside Lagos. It is the greatest market for buying vehicle parts in the entirety of Africa. It is a decent hotspot for both tokunbo (unfamiliar utilized) and new auto extra parts in Nigeria, and numerous clients result in these present circumstances market from Ghana, Ivory Coast, and different nations in Africa.

== Structural composition ==
Due to the lack of good roads and spaces around the market, the Lagos State Government on 30 June 2015 demolished some parts of the market which led to series of crisis within the market.

== See also ==
- List of markets in Lagos
- Official Website: https://www.ladipoautomarket.com.ng
