= Afang soup =

Vegetable soup originating from southern Nigeria

- Place of origin: Akwa Ibom State, Nigeria
- Associated cuisine: Ibibio cuisine

Afang soup is a vegetable soup made by the Ibibio people of Akwa Ibom State, Nigeria. The soup is also common to the Efik people of Cross River State. The Ibibio people of Akwa Ibom adopted this soup as part of their cultural identity. It is served at home and, sometimes at ceremonies like weddings, birthdays, burials, and festivals, mostly in the southern part of Nigeria. Afang soup is nutritious and its preparation cost is adaptable based on family needs.

== Ingredients ==
The ingredients used to prepare afang soup include beef, fish (dried and stock), palm oil, crayfish, pepper, kpomo, shaki (cow tripe), waterleaf, afang leaf, onion, periwinkle, salt, and seasonings.

== Preparation ==
Add crayfish and pepper to meat stock and boil it. Add grounded okazi to the beef stock and cook it. Then heat up the oil in a separate pot and add chopped onions for about a minute. Add stock fish, dried fish, and other prepared meats like beef, ponmo and shaki to the pot. Taste for seasoning, stir, and adjust as necessary. Then, add the afang leaf, stir to combine, reduce the heat to simmer for an additional two minutes, and then turn off the heat. Can be eaten with fufu(swallow made from processed cassava)or garri.

== Gallery ==
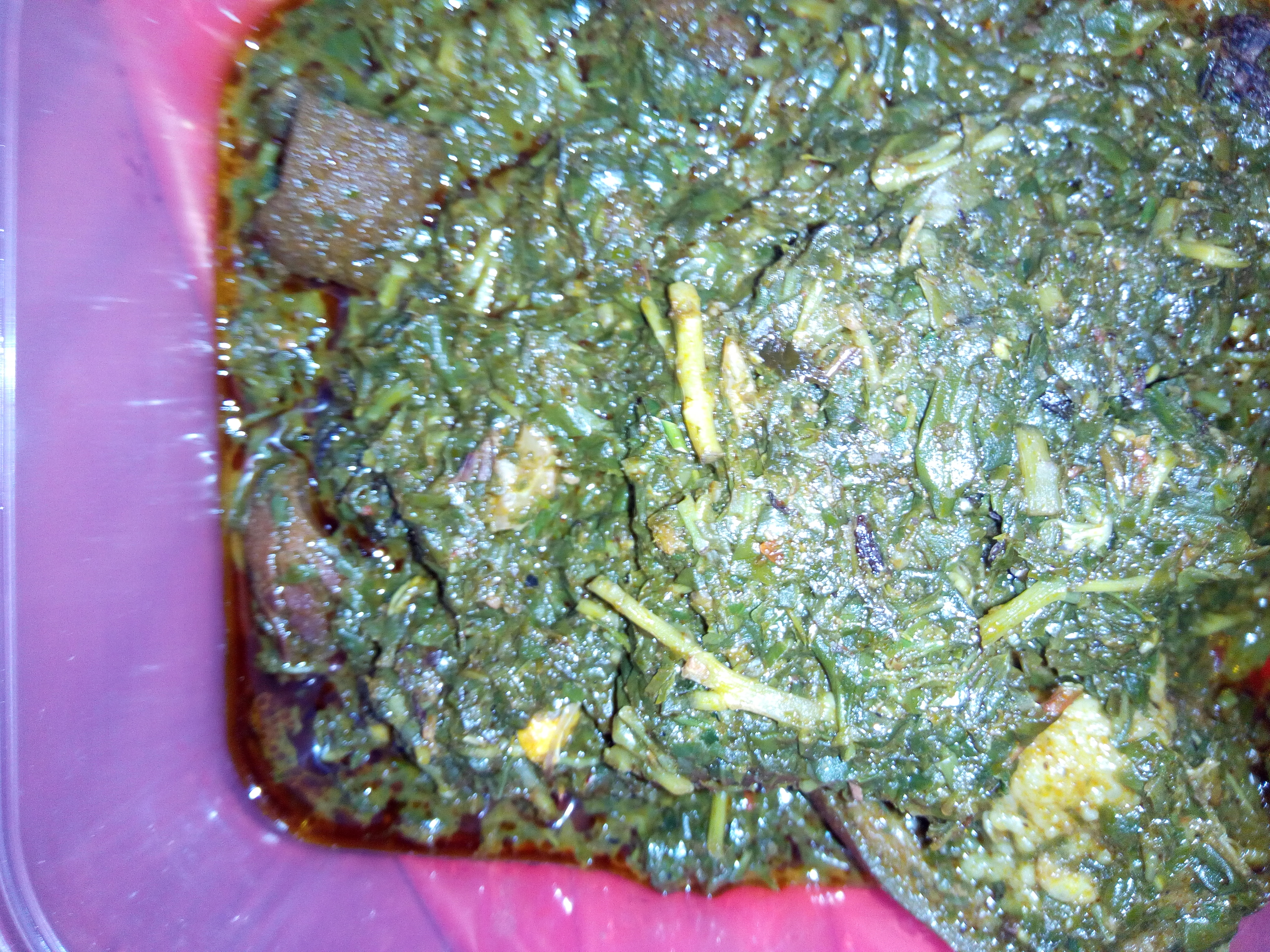
Afang Soup

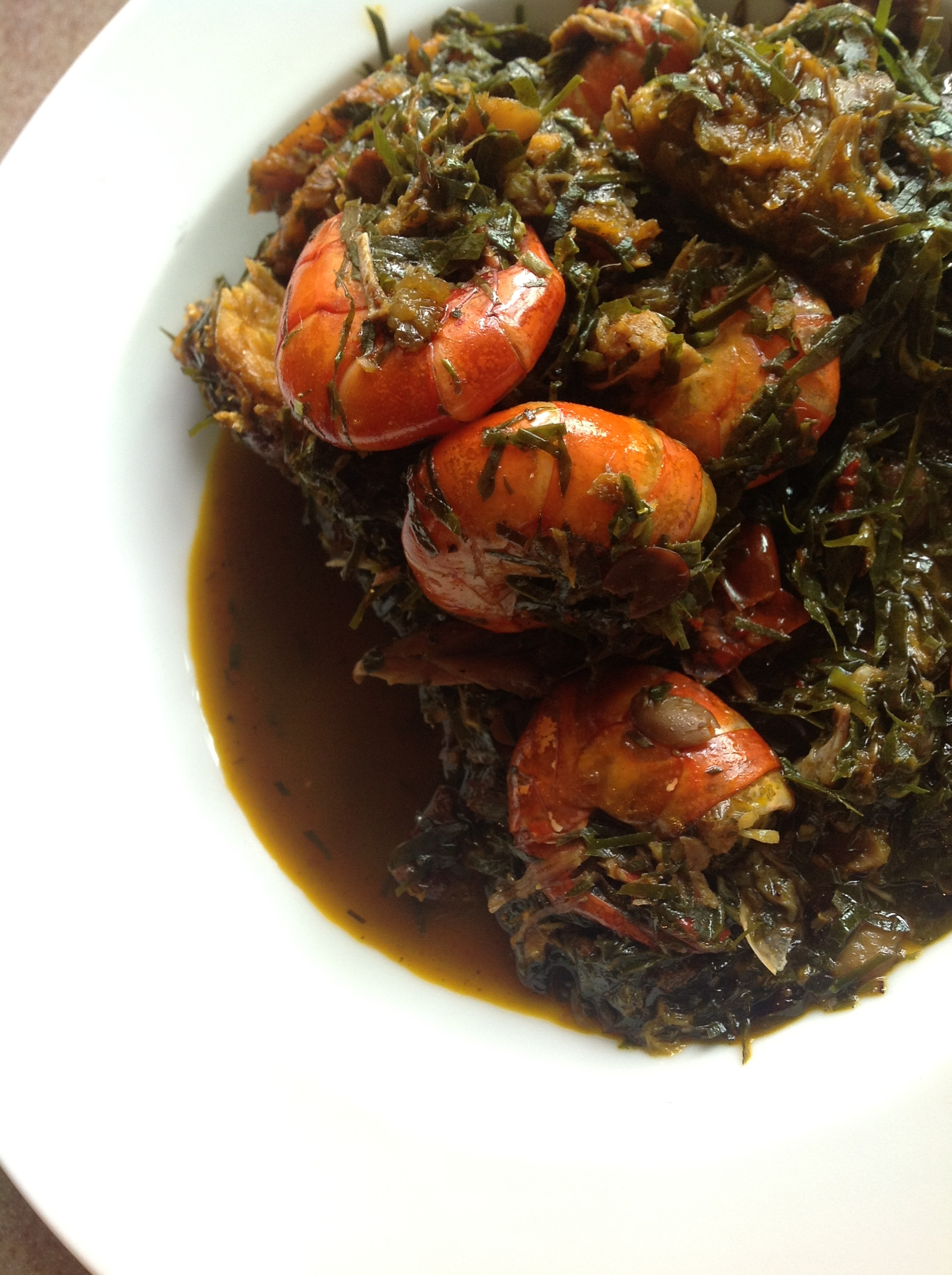

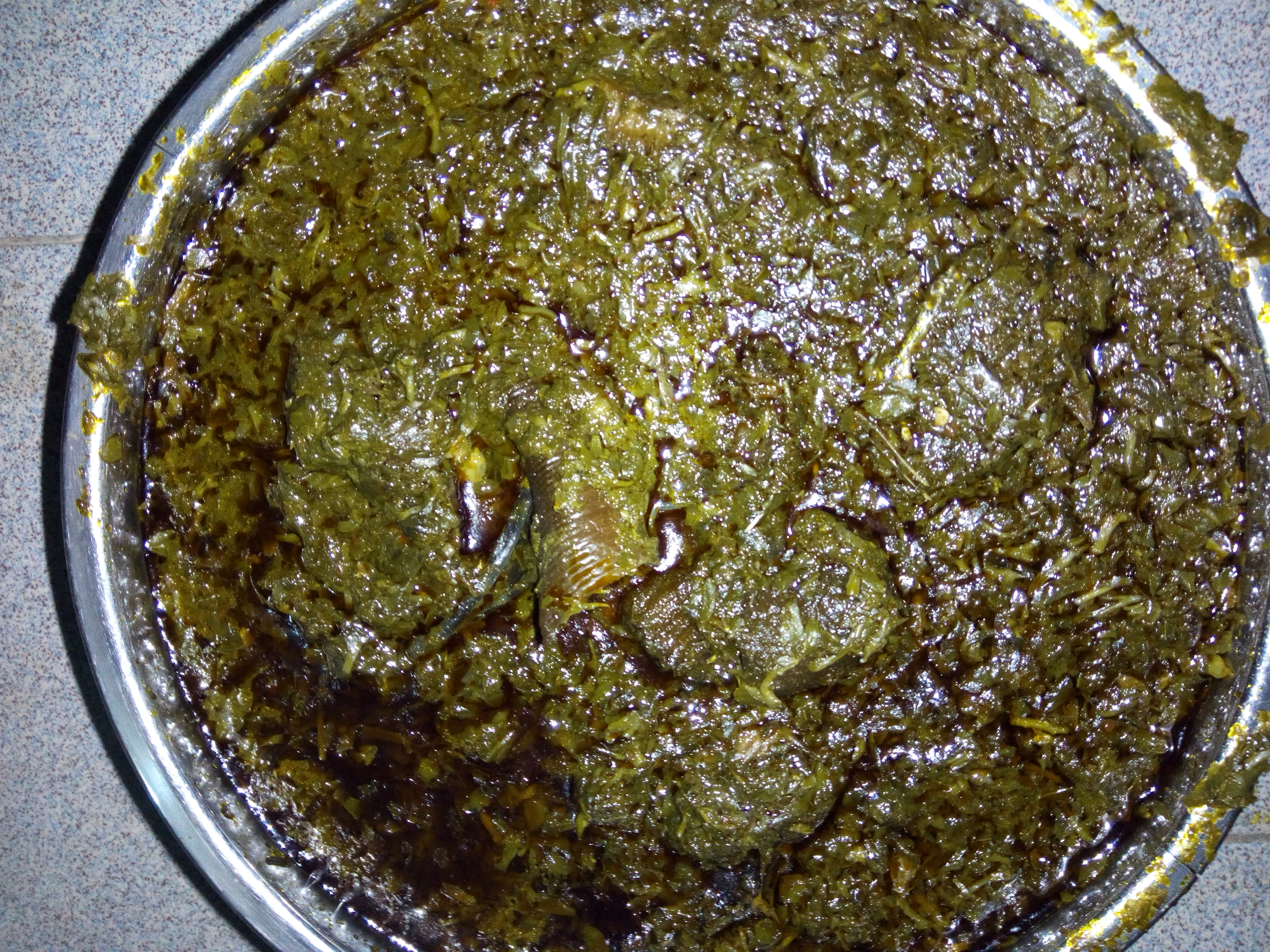
