= Iyana-Iba =

Place in Lagos State

Iyana-Iba is a place in Ojo local government area, Lagos State, Nigeria.

== Geography ==
Iyana-Iba is a busy area in the Lagos State due to its popular local markets and road dimension which leads to Festac, Mile 2, Alaba etc. The Iyana-Iba road also lead to the Lagos State University main gate facing the south and the back gate facing the east.

=== Market ===
It is surrounded with local markets well known in Lagos State.

== See also ==
- List of markets in Lagos

== Education Close-by ==
- Lagos State University
