= List of markets in Lagos =

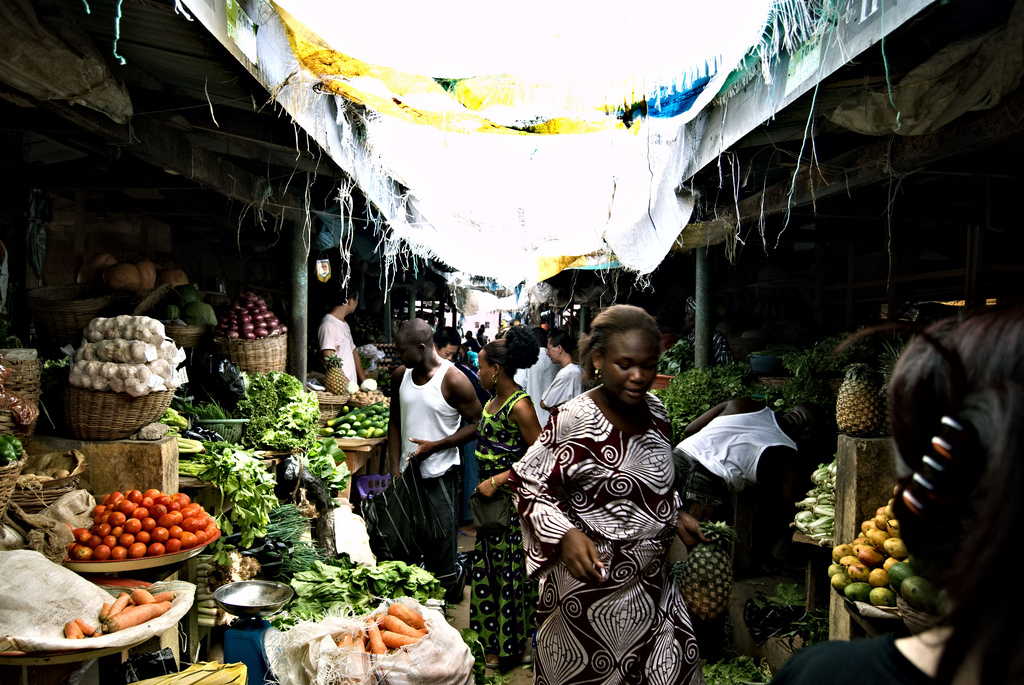
Lekki Market, 2008

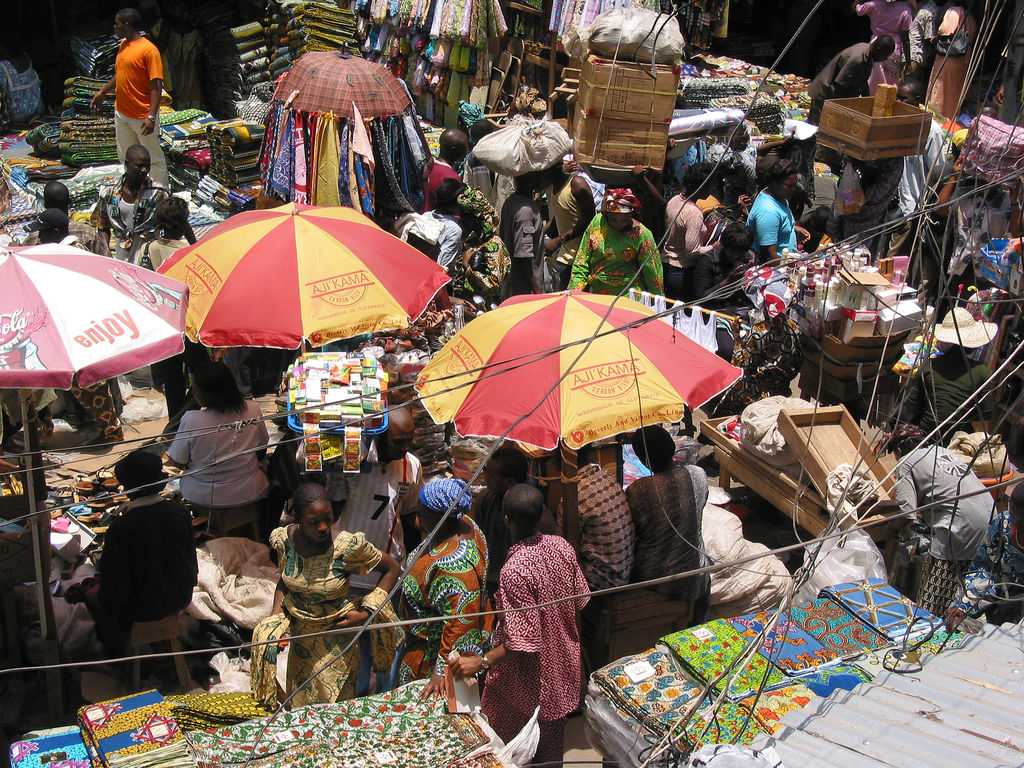
Market, 2003

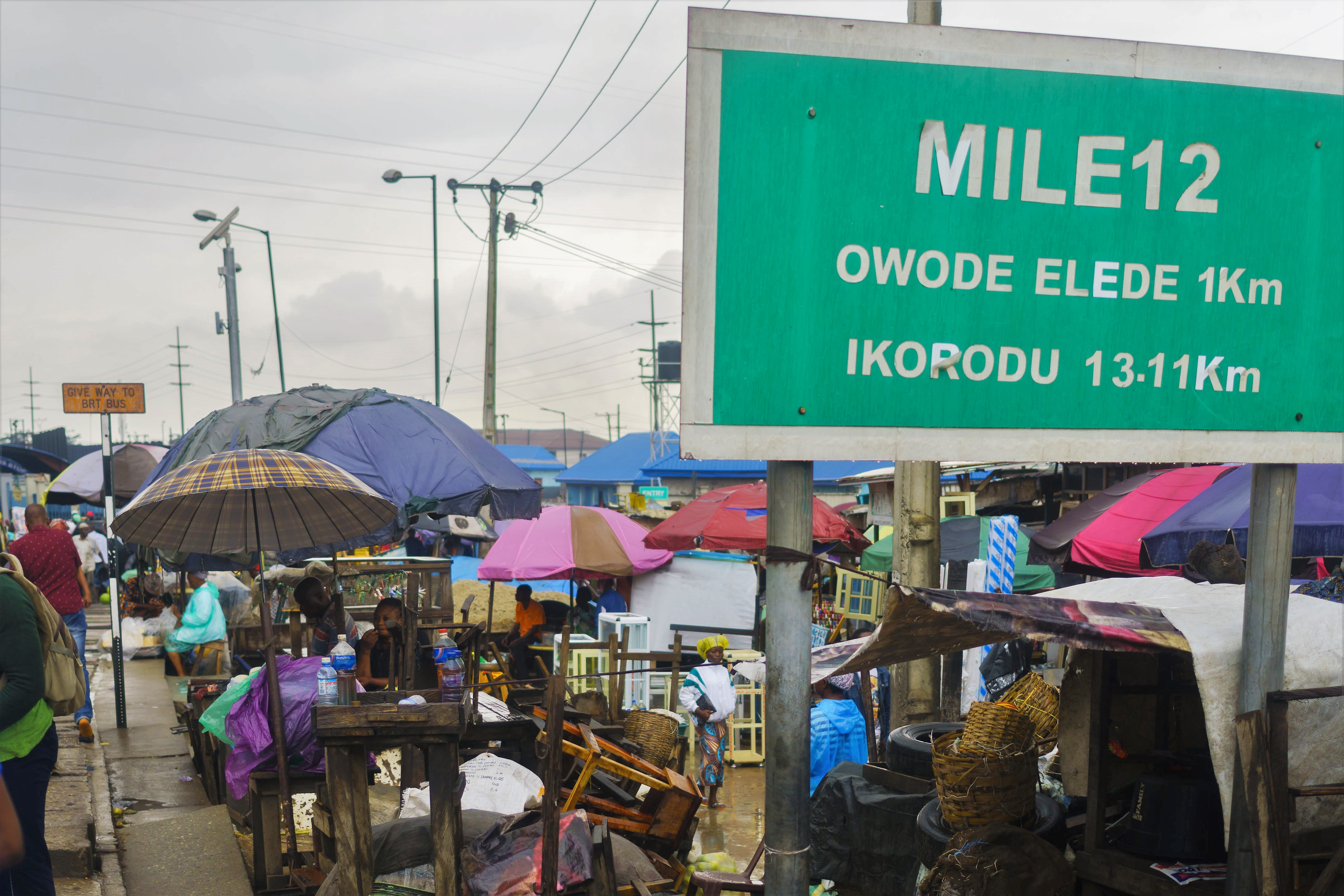
Mile 12, 2019

Markets in Lagos, Nigeria, offer a broad and diverse range of new, second-hand goods, products and merchandise for consumers.

Notable markets in Lagos include:

- Agbalata Market Badagry
- Alaba international market
- Ajah Market
- Aratumi Market
- Balogun Market, Lagos Island
- Bar Beach Market
- Computer Village
- Èbúté Èrò Market, Lagos Island
- Epe Fish Market
- Iyana-Iba Market
- Ikotun Market
- Igando Market
- Idumota Market
- Ita Faji Market
- Isale Eko Market, Lagos Island
- Jankarra Market, Lagos Island
- Ladipo Market
- Lekki Market
- Agboju Market
- Daleko Market
- Morocco I and II markets
- Mushin market
- Oyingbo Market
- Mile 12 Market
- Oniru New Market
- Fespar market
- Oshodi Market
- Rauf Aregbesola Market
- Téjúoshó Market
- Sangotedo Market
- Ajuwe Market
- Jakande Market
- Akodo Market, Epe
- Boundary Seafood Market
- Apongbo Market (household and souvenirs)
- Liverpool Crayfish Market
- (Nigerian Army Shopping) Arena Market, Oshodi (Different from the Lagos Arena, Lekki)
- Cele Market
- Ijesha Market, Ijeshatedo
- State Market
- Agege Market
- Jankara Market, Ijaiye
- Owode Onirin
- Amu market
- Onipanu iron rod market
- Odunade market Orile
- Ojuwoye Market
- Plaintain Market
- Ladipo Paper Market
- Aswani Market
- Leather market
- Ikoga market
