= Seamoriow Football Club =

Football club in Lagos State, Nigeria

Seamoriow FC
- Full name: Seamoriow Football Club
- Nickname: "TheInspiredBoyz"
- Founded: 2022
- Ground: Seamoriow Sports Complex, Ikotun, Lagos
- Capacity: n/a
- Owner: Seamoriow Sports Ltd
- Chairman: Oluwaseyi Amos
- Coach: Mathew Tolulope
- League: Nigeria Nationwide League Division One
- 2025: NLO, debut season
- Website: seamoriowsports.com

Seamoriow Football Club (commonly referred to as Seamoriow FC) is a Nigerian football team based in Alimosho, Lagos State. Founded in 2022 as part of the Seamoriow Sports development project, the club competes in the Nigeria Nationwide League Division One (NLO), the third tier of Nigerian football league system.

It operates as the senior side of the Seamoriow Football Academy, which runs youth teams from under-10 to under-19 levels.

== History ==
Seamoriow FC was launched in 2022 as the senior extension of the Seamoriow Football Academy. In 2024, the club won the inaugural Peace Cup Scouting Tournament, defeating FC Sporting Bethel 2–0 in the final. That same year, Seamoriow FC also played high-profile friendly matches against Nigeria's under-20 team (the Flying Eagles) and the Super Eagles B team.

The club made its NLO debut in 2025, beginning with a 3–0 win over Orin FC. Other early results included a 3–0 victory against Racine FC, a 2–1 comeback against Bison FC, and a 1–1 draw with 36 Lions FC.

== Facilities ==
Seamoriow FC plays at the Seamoriow Sports Complex in Ikotun, Lagos. The facility, commissioned in July 2022, features a mini football pitch, dressing rooms, medical facilities, and administrative offices.

== Youth development ==
The Seamoriow Football Academy supports the club with youth teams in several age categories (U-10, U-15, U-19,). The academy combines football training with educational and personal development programs.

== Seamoriow U 15 League/Championship ==
The Seamoriow U-15 Championship is an annual youth football competition organised by Seamoriow Sports in Lagos, Nigeria. The competition was established in 2022, bringing together various football academies and youth teams from Lagos.

The competition is in its 5^{th} edition which is slated to officially hold from August 24 – September 6, 2026.

The official draw for the 5^{th} edition was held at the Sports complex of Seamoriow Football Club on August 18, 2026.

Past winners of the Championship includes: Super Accurate (2022 edition), Fortune FA (2023 edition), B United (2024 edition), Seamoriow U-15 (2025 edition).

Victor Sunday of Seamoriow emerged as Top scorer and Golden Ball (MVP) winner for the 2025 edition

== Notable players ==
Notable players linked with Seamoriow FC include:

- Popoola Ridwan, who later signed for Kisvárda FC in Hungary's top division.
- Salako Paul, recognized as a standout performer during the club's NLO debut season.
- Ndubueze Emmanuel, a workaholic centre back with versatility to play as a left back. Transferred to Shooting Stars Sports Club
- Idris Abubakar Bonni, a central midfielder who recently moved to Enyimba FC.

== Current squad ==
Note: Flags indicate national team as defined under FIFA eligibility rules; some limited exceptions apply. Players may hold more than one non-FIFA nationality.

No.	Pos.	Nation	Player
1	GK	NGA	ADENLE, MUTIU ADEDAYO
2	DF	NGA	EZE, SAMUEL CHIDEBEM
4	AM	NGA	ADEWUYI, QUADRI AKANNI
6	FW	NGA	SALAKO, PAUL TIMILEYIN
7	DM	NGA	EFFIONG, EMMANUEL FRANCIS
8	RW/FW	NGA	MARK, SAMUEL ETIM
9	LB	NGA	ATANDA, TOBILOBA ADEFIKAYO
10	LB	NGA	AJAYI, OLUWATOBI ABRAHAM
11	CM	NGA	CHUKWUEMEKA, CHRISTIAN WILFRED
13	CM	NGA	ISMAIL, BABATUNDE AYINLA
14	CB	NGA	MOSES, EMMANUEL ONYEGBULE
15	AM	NGA	SULAIMON, TEMITOPE FAWAS
16	FW	NGA	ADEKEYE, GAIUS OLUWATOBI
17	FW/LWF	NGA	JAIYEOLA, KAMALDEEN OLADIMEJI
18	RWF/LWF	NGA	DAVID, GIDEON INI

No.	Pos.	Nation	Player
19	RWF/FW	NGA	SUNDAY, VICTOR EMMANUEL
20	FW	NGA	ISONG, NSIKAK UDOH
21	MF	NGA	BADMUS, WARIS ADEKUNLE
22	FW/LWF	NGA	ADEWALE, SAMAD AYOMIDE
23	DM/CM	NGA	MACAULAY PAUL ANTHONY
25	RWF/LWF	NGA	ADENIYI, ABASS ADEDEJI
26	CMF	NGA	ARAWANDE, OLUBORI EZEKIEL

== See also ==
- Nigeria Nationwide League
- Kisvárda FC
- ALIMOSHO
