= Tejuosho Market =

Retail market in Lagos, Nigeria

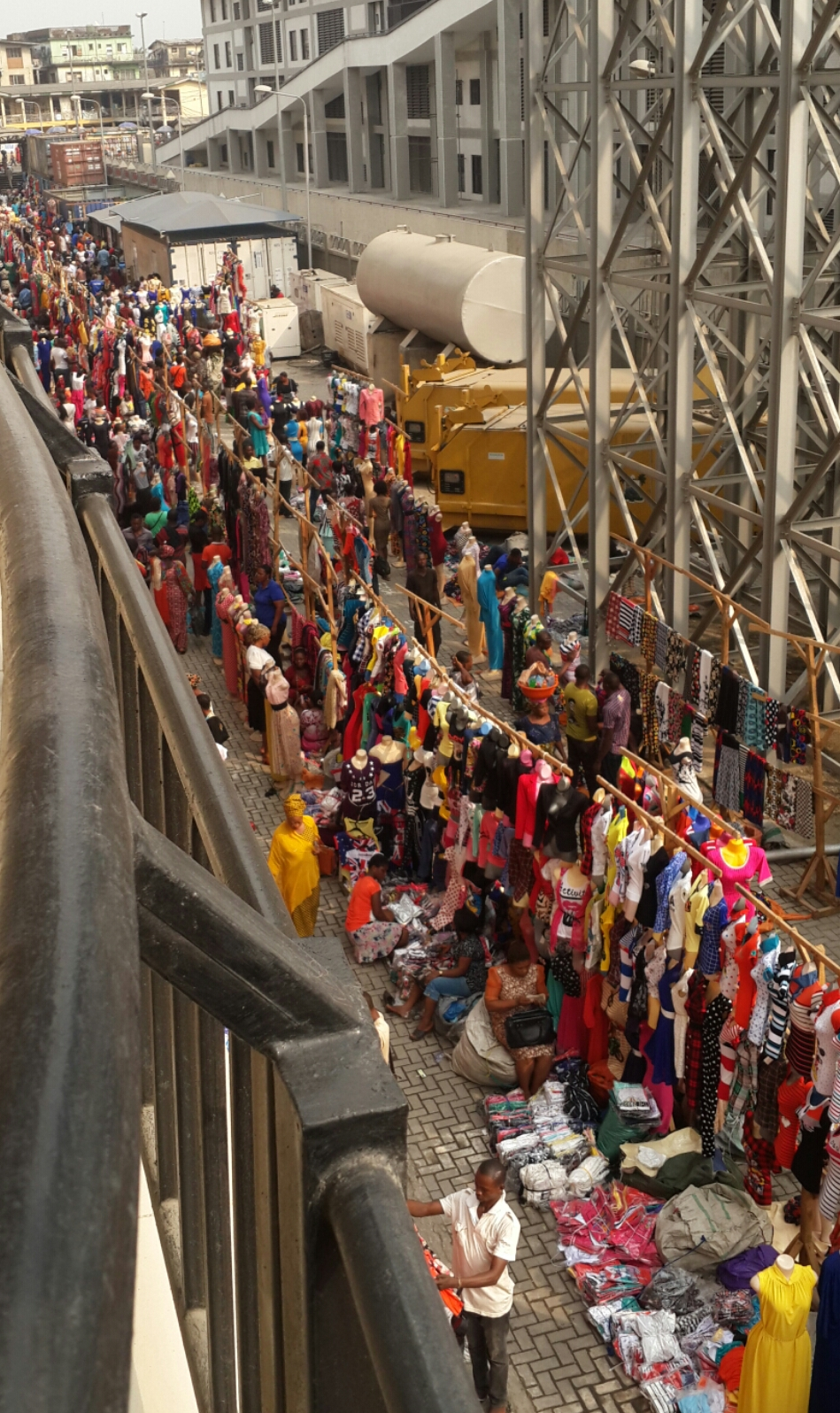
Tejuosho Market

Tejuosho Market is an ultramodern market located along the Ojuelegba-Itire Road in Yaba, Lagos, Lagos State, Nigeria. The market is divided into two phases (Phase I and Phase II).

Some years after a fire incident that destroyed most part of the market, the Lagos State Government, Stormberg Engineering Limited, and First Bank of Nigeria in a public-private partnership reconstructed the market into a mega shopping plaza as part of plans to turn Lagos into a "Mega City".

== Criticism ==
Tejuosho market was a middle class conventional market where commodities were sold at a cut-price. The hike in price of stalls after the market was reconstructed has left operators who earn relatively low-income criticizing the state government for its involvement of the private sector into the reconstruction of the market.

== See also ==
- List of markets in Lagos
