= Balogun Market =

Market in Nigeria

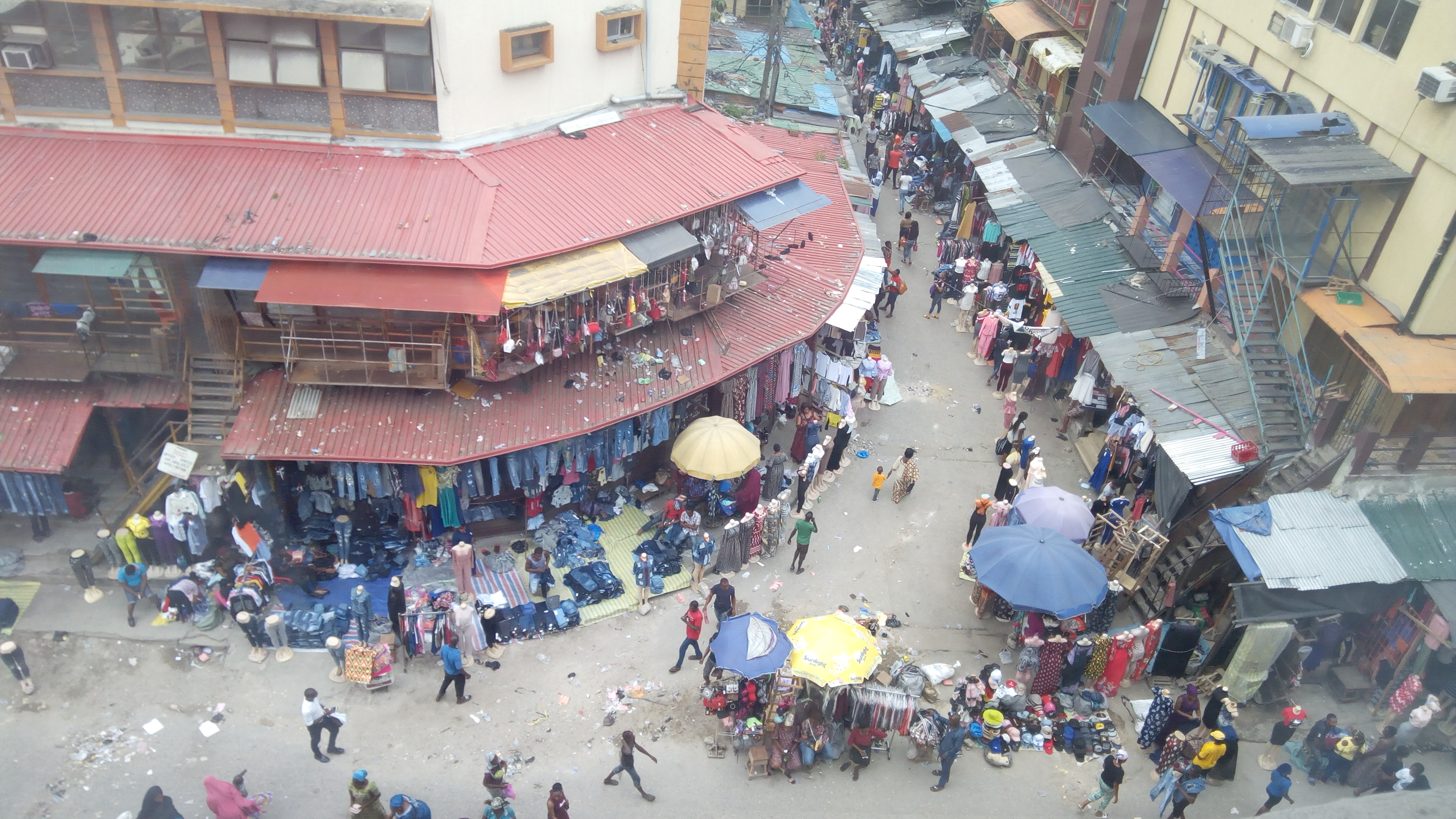
Balogun Market, Lagos Island

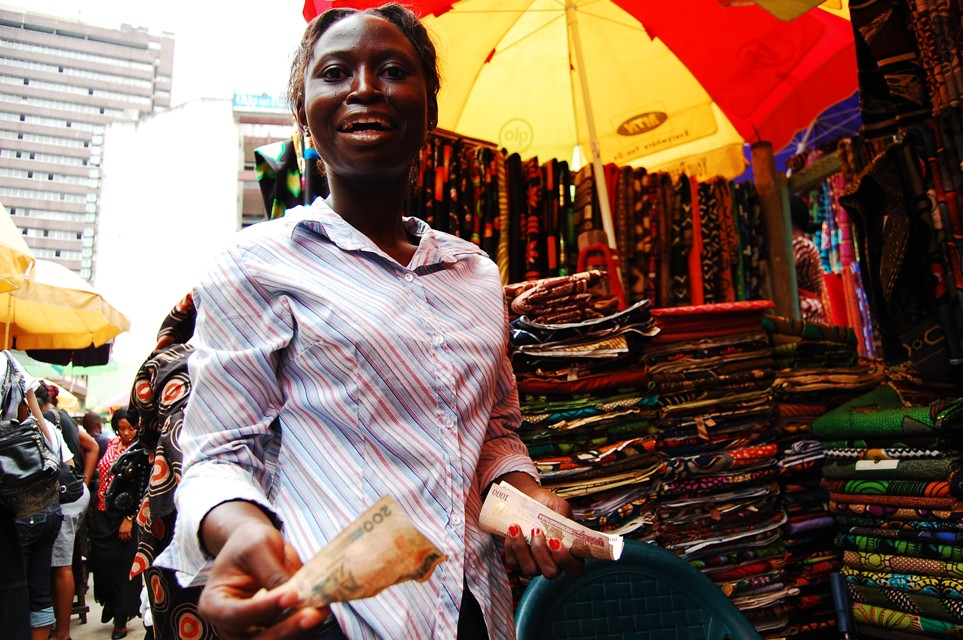

Balogun Ajeniya Market is a market located on Lagos Island in Lagos State, Nigeria. The market has no particular address because it sprawls across so many streets on the island. Balogun market is recognized as the best place to buy fabrics, shoes, and all sorts of wares.

== Fire Incidents ==
The popular market has experienced multiple fire incidents over time, with notable occurrences in November 2019, January 2020, and December 2025. These fires have taken place on various dates, but they predominantly occur during the dry season.

== See also ==
- List of markets in Lagos
