= Idumota Market =

Market in Lagos

Soundscape of the market by Emeka Ogboh

Idumota Market is a market located on Lagos Island, a suburb and local government area of Lagos State. It is one of the oldest and arguably one of the largest markets in West Africa with thousands of lock-up shops occupying various buildings in the market. The market along with Alaba international market is a major distribution hub for Home videos and music in Lagos State, and one of the biggest in Nigeria.

== Structural composition ==
Idumota market is so popular that large sales are recorded as early as 7am. The market is made up of multiple storey-buildings with some measuring about 5 or more floors.

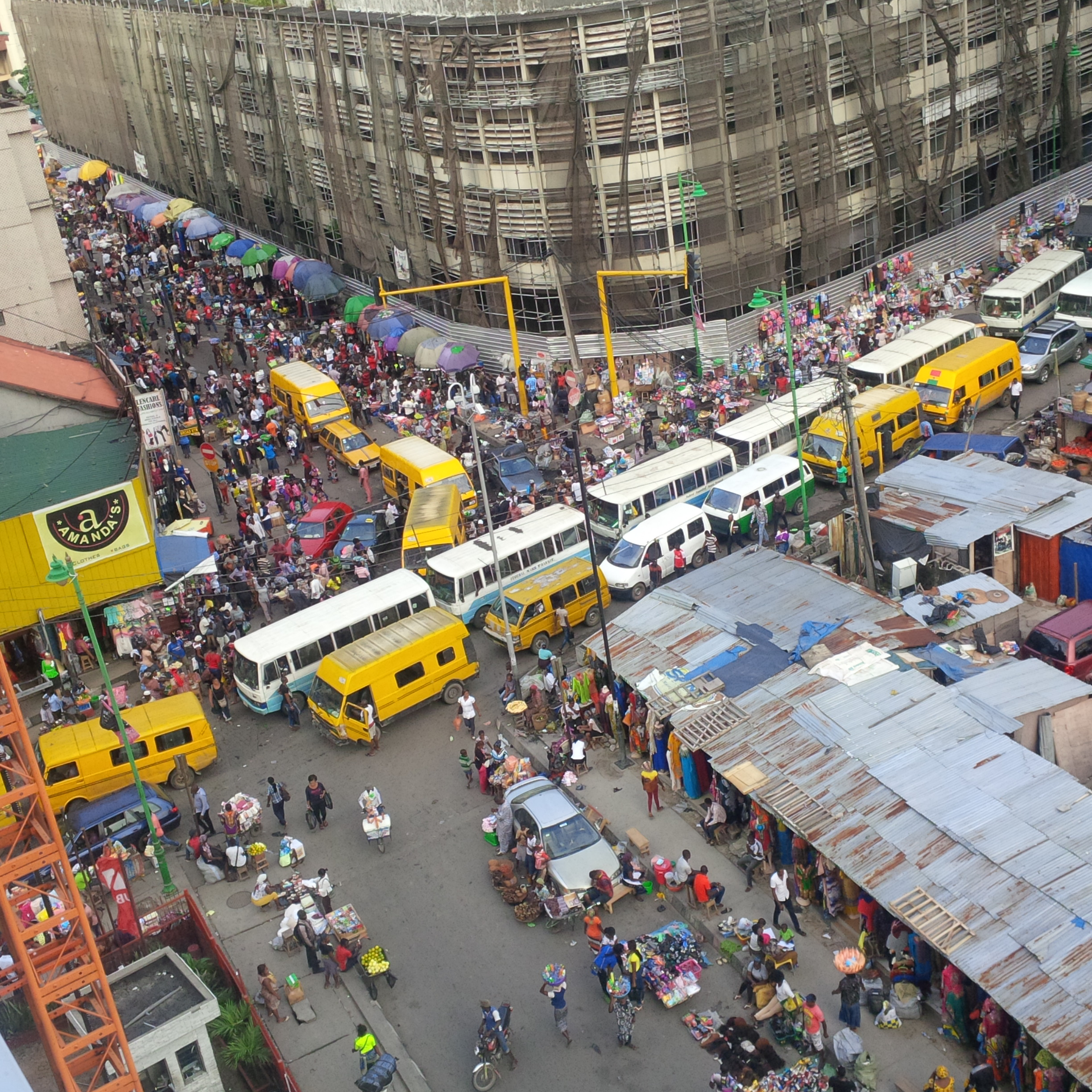
Traders at Idumota

In 2010, the Lagos State Government demolished some illegal structures in order to improve vehicular and human movement in and around the market.

== Neighborhood ==
During weekdays, the neighborhood of Idumota is densely populated by shoppers, traders and bus passengers. From the Carter bridge, ascending into Lagos Island, passengers can see the neighborhood before disembarking at their final destination.

Idumota was previously the location of an armed forces remembrance cenotaph, called Soja Idumota, built as a monument to Nigerian soldiers who served with the West African Frontier Force. An Eyo masquerade statue and a clocktower are also some monuments at Idumota.

== See also ==
- List of markets in Lagos
- Cinema of Nigeria Distribution
