= Ikotun =

Market in Lagos, Nigeria

Coordinates: 6.54882°N 3.26952°E

- Metropolitan city
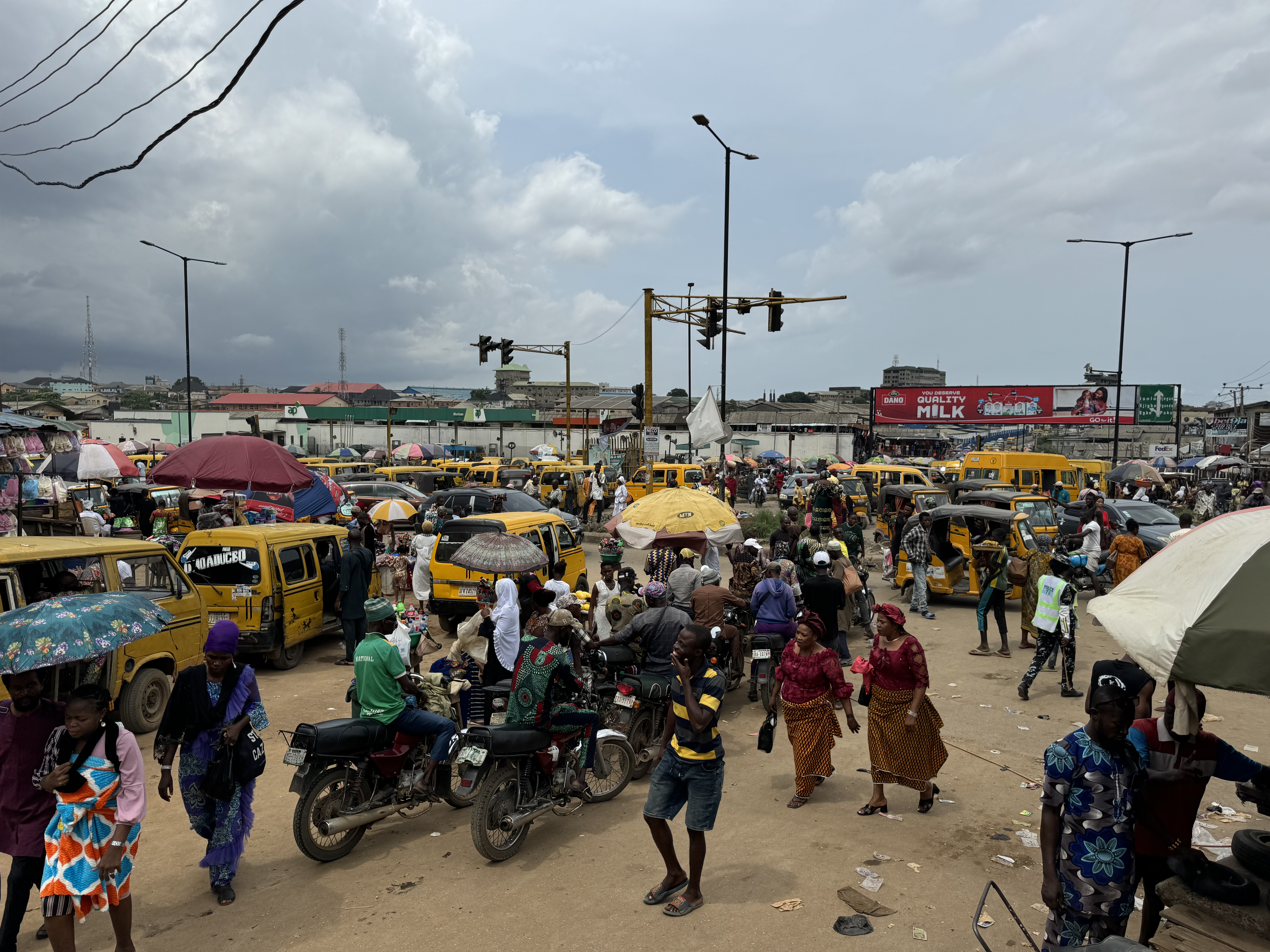
- Ikotun roundabout (June 2024)

- Location of Ikotun in Lagos State, Nigeria
- State: Lagos State
- Local Government Area: Alimosho

Government
  - Governor: Babajide Sanwo-Olu PDP
- Time zone: UTC+1 (CET)
  - Summer (DST): UTC+1 (CEST)
- Postal Code: 102213

Ikotun also known as Ikotun Road is a metropolitan city and community located in the Alimosho local government area of Lagos State, Nigeria.

== Geography ==
The Ikotun roundabout has to four outlets which lead to Ijegun via the Ijegun road to its west, Iyana-Ipaja via the Ikotun-Idimu road to its east, Isolo via the Isolo/Ikotun road to its south (the Synagogue Church of All Nations is located along this road on the Ikotun-Egbe axis) and to Igando via the Igando road to its north. It also has the Lagos Bus Rapid Transit System.

=== Market ===
Ikotun Market also known as Irepodun market is an open-air market located in Ikotun. The market which is particularly known for its price-based selling technique has about 8,400 lock-up shops and over 10,000 traders-selling items ranging from foodstuff to clothes, appliances, gadgets and so on, making it one of the biggest markets in Alimosho local government, Lagos and a major contributor to the growth of the economy of the state.

== Education Close-by ==
- Ikotun Senior High

== Notable Sports Facility ==
- Seamoriow Sport Complex
- Kasali Kudus Sport Complex

== See also ==
- List of markets in Lagos
