= Akowonjo =

Neighborhood in Lagos State, Nigeria

Coordinates: 6°36′29.9″N 3°18′11.5″E

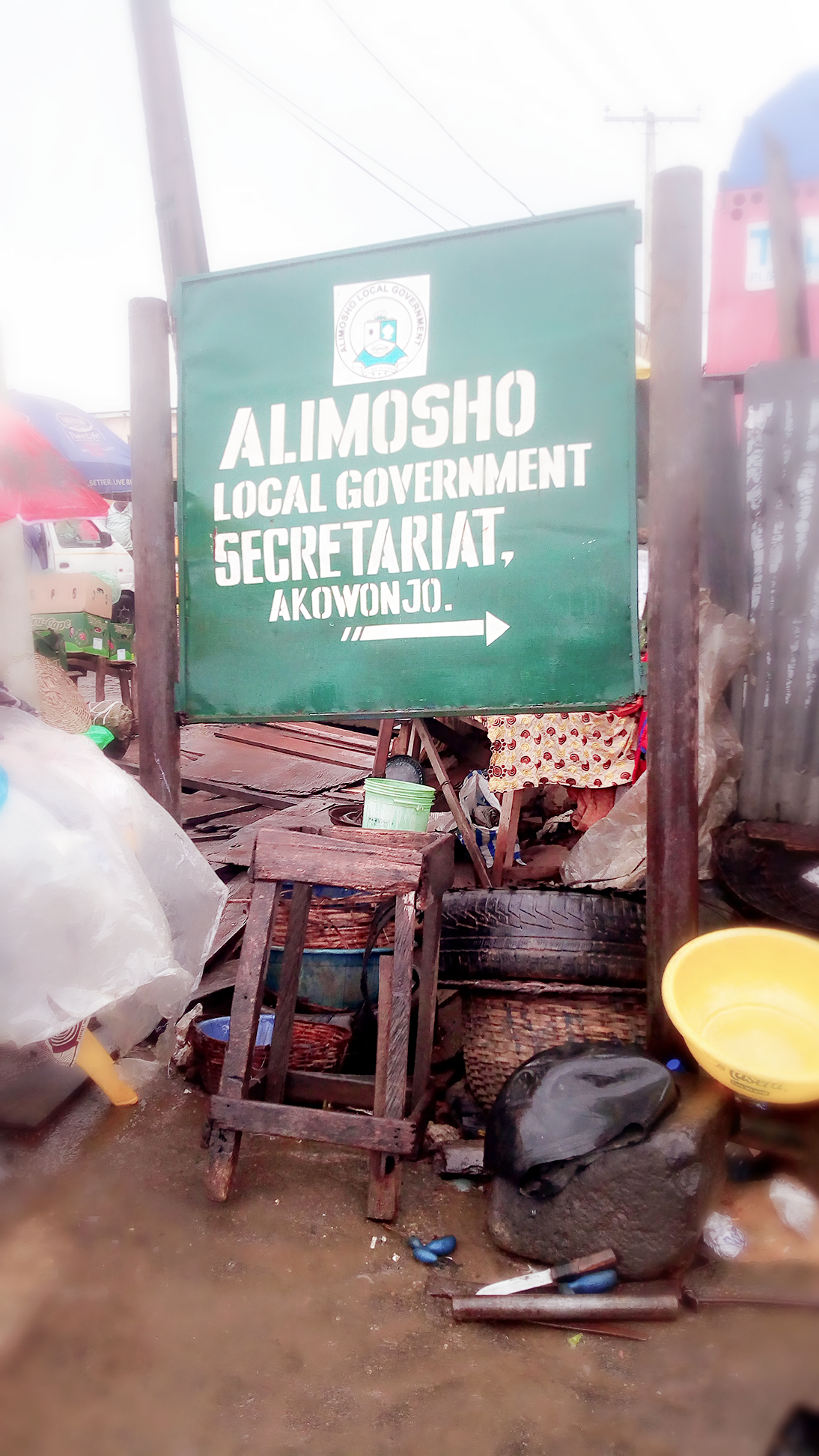
Secretariat Akowonjo, Alimosho LGA Lagos state

Akowonjo is a neighborhood in Lagos State, Nigeria. The inhabitants of Akowonjo are mostly Egba. The Egbas settled in Akowonjo circa 1830 because of the intertribal wars and conflicts that were prevalent in the region at the time, According to local historical accounts, the area was then a dense forest that the settlers cleared, claimed, and established as a permanent settlement, rather than land acquired through purchase.

Akowonjo is located within the Alimosho Local Government Area of Lagos State and is considered one of the older settlements in the area, predating the emergence of the Shasha community.

== Gallery ==
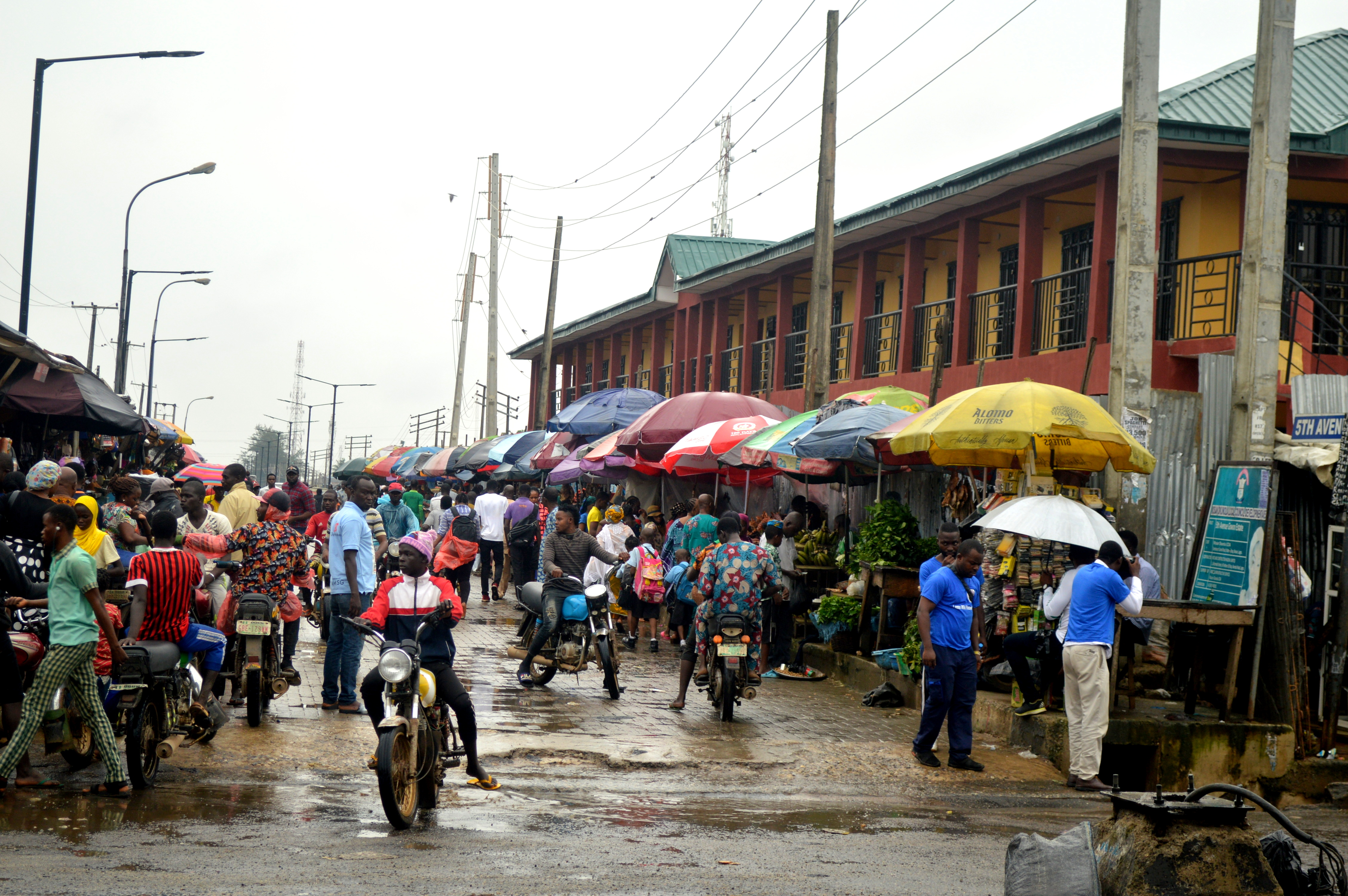
5th Avenue Road, Egbeda, Lagos

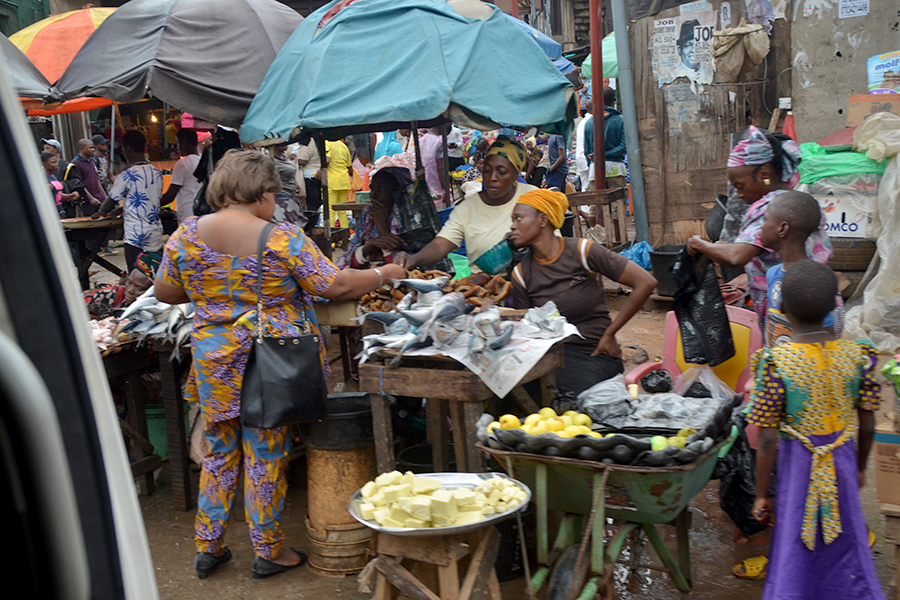

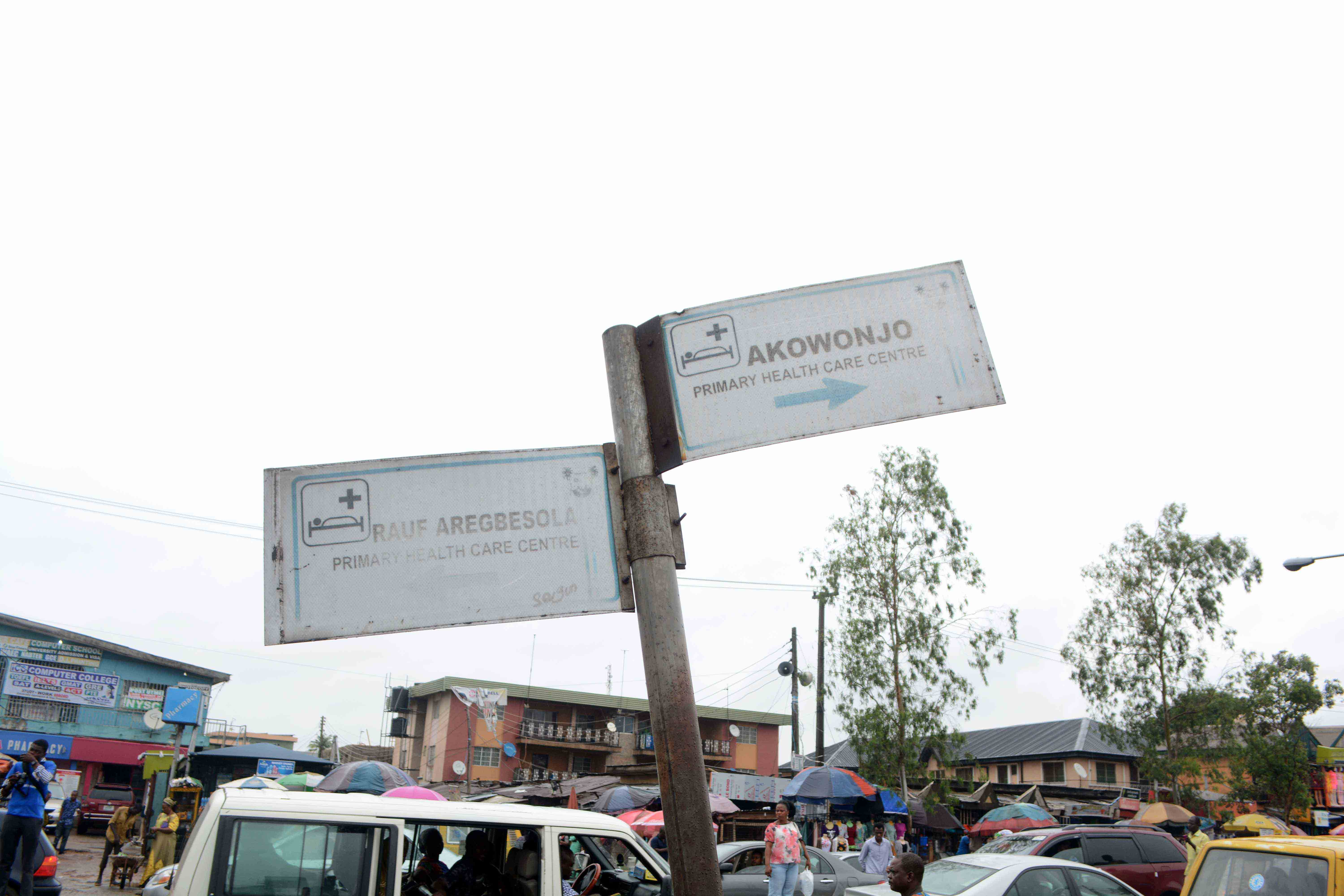

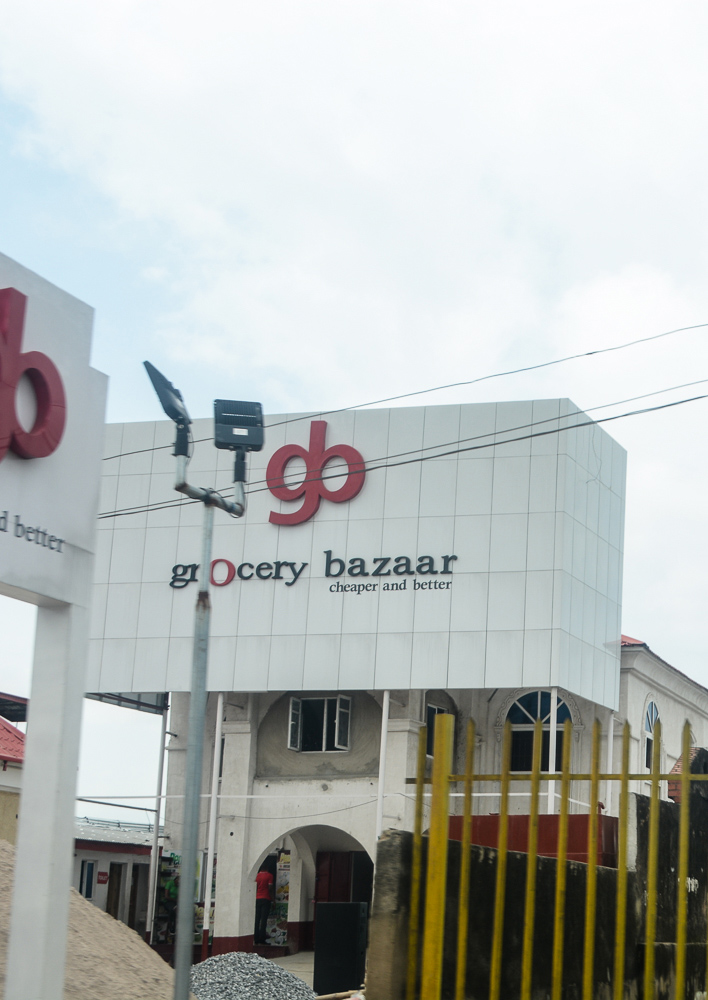

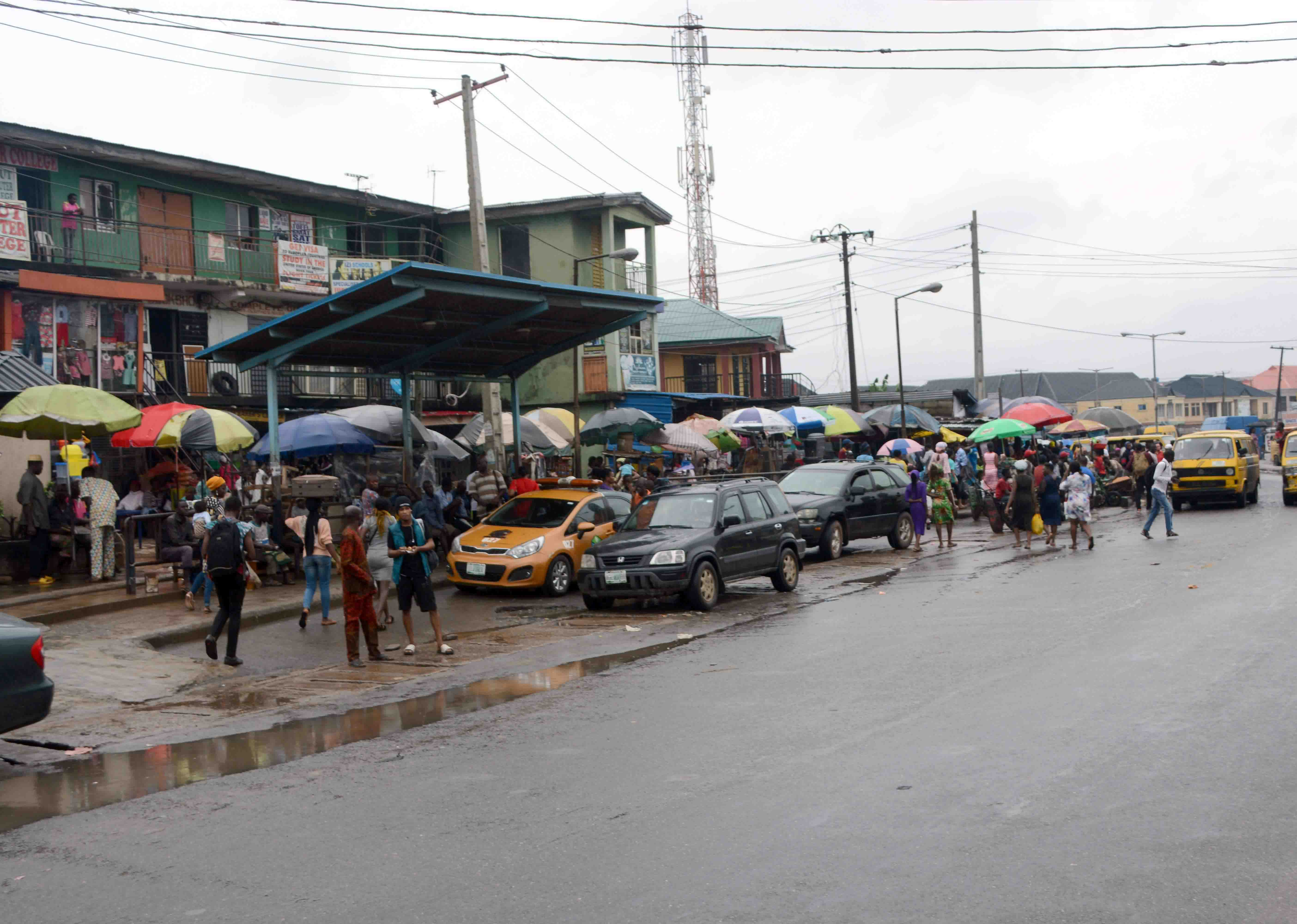

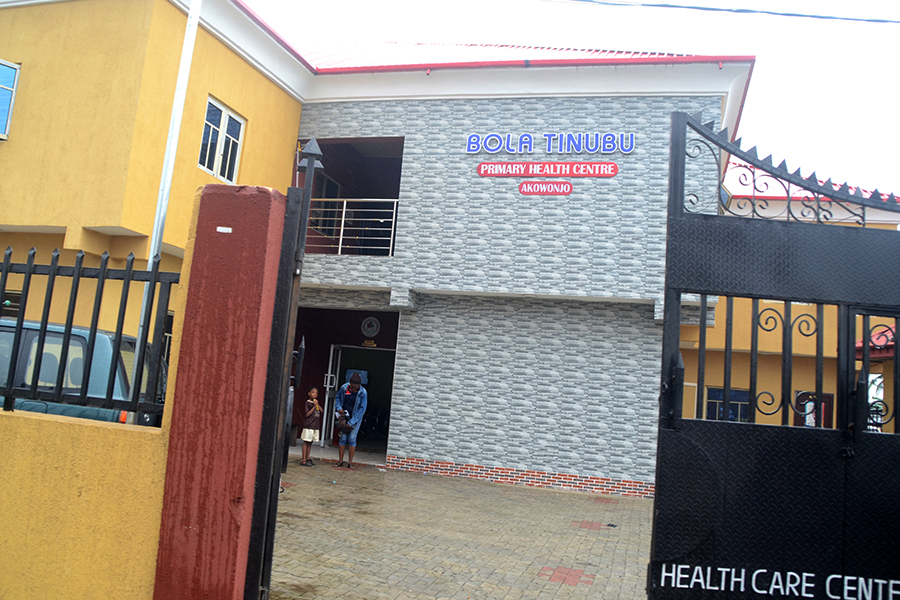

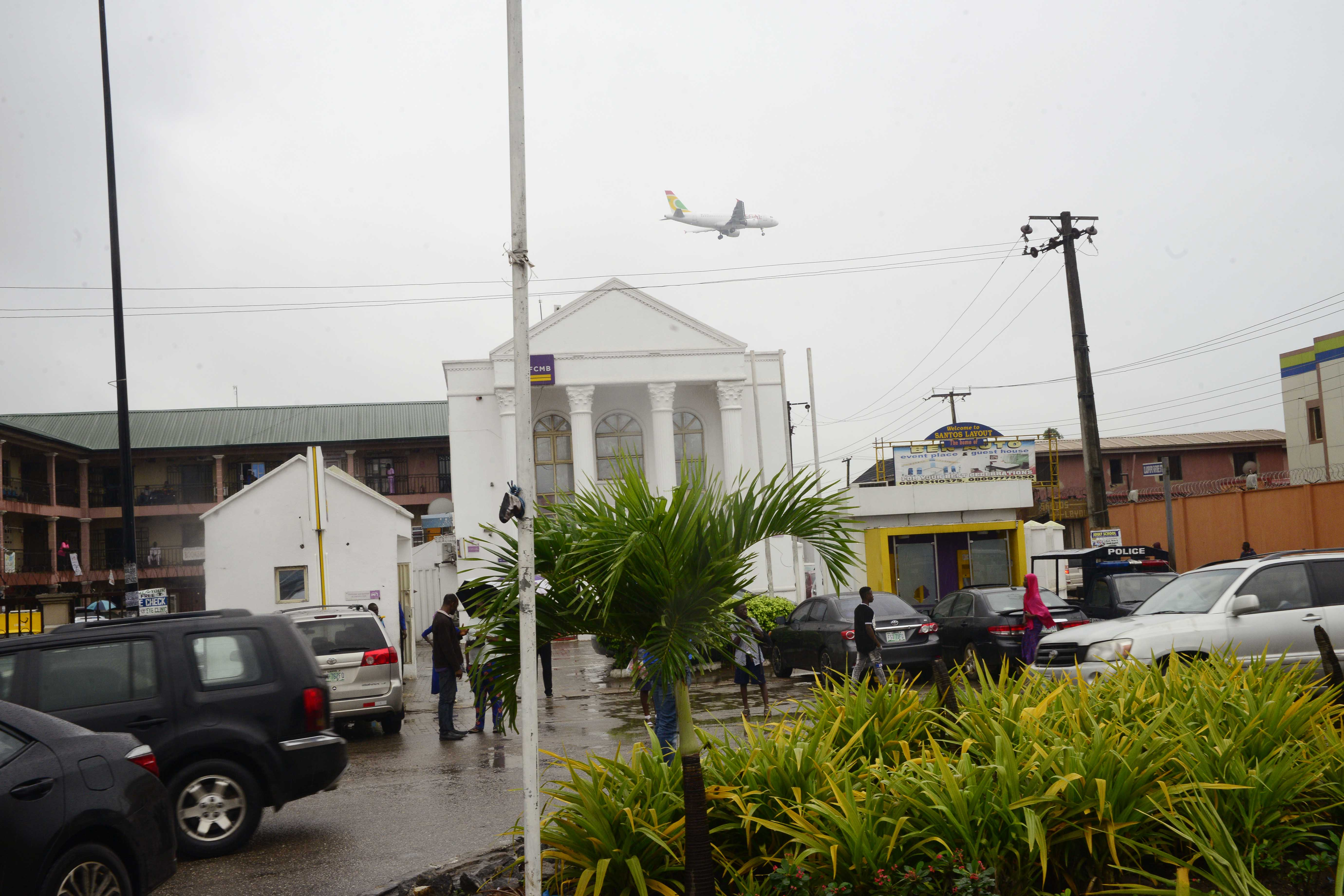

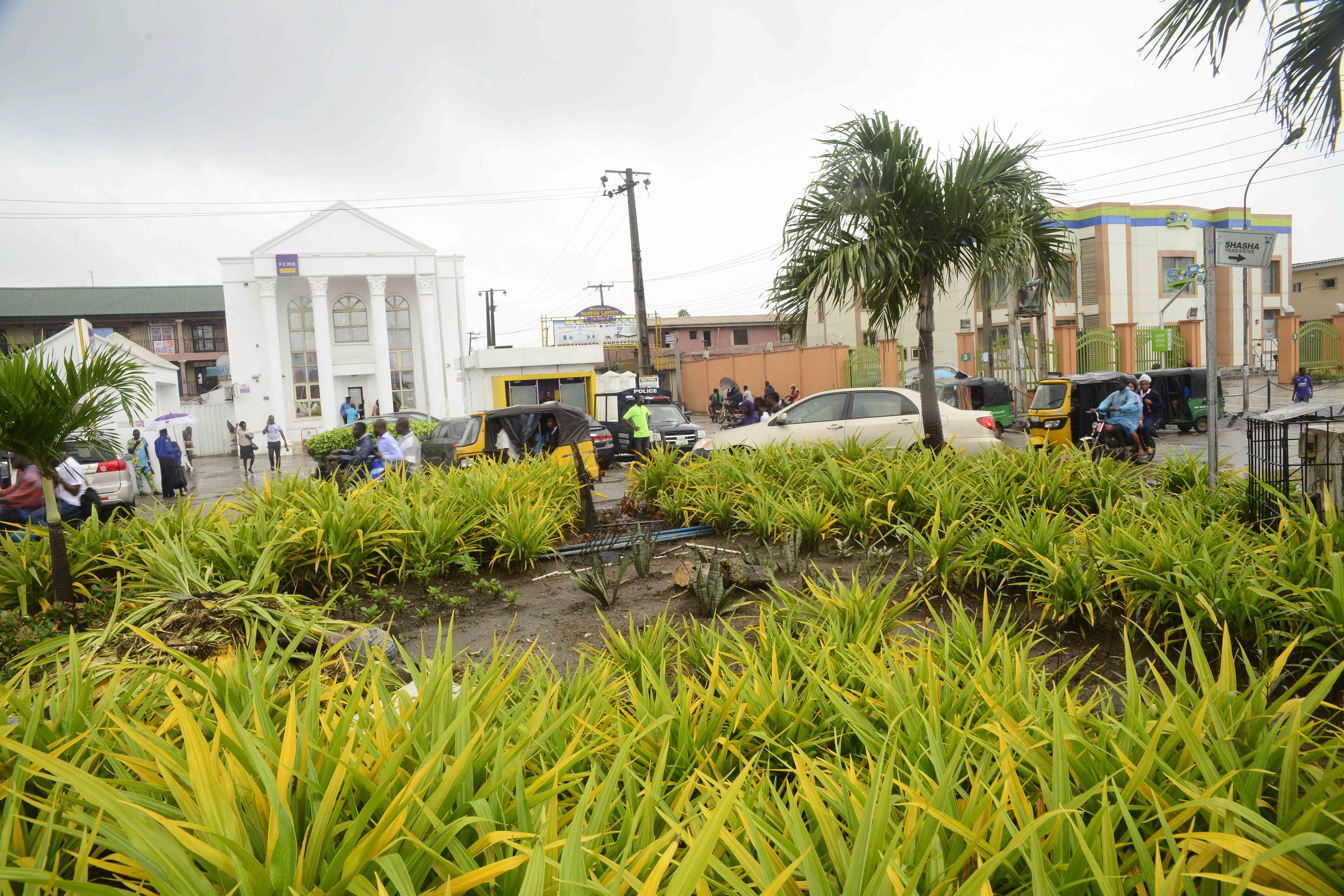

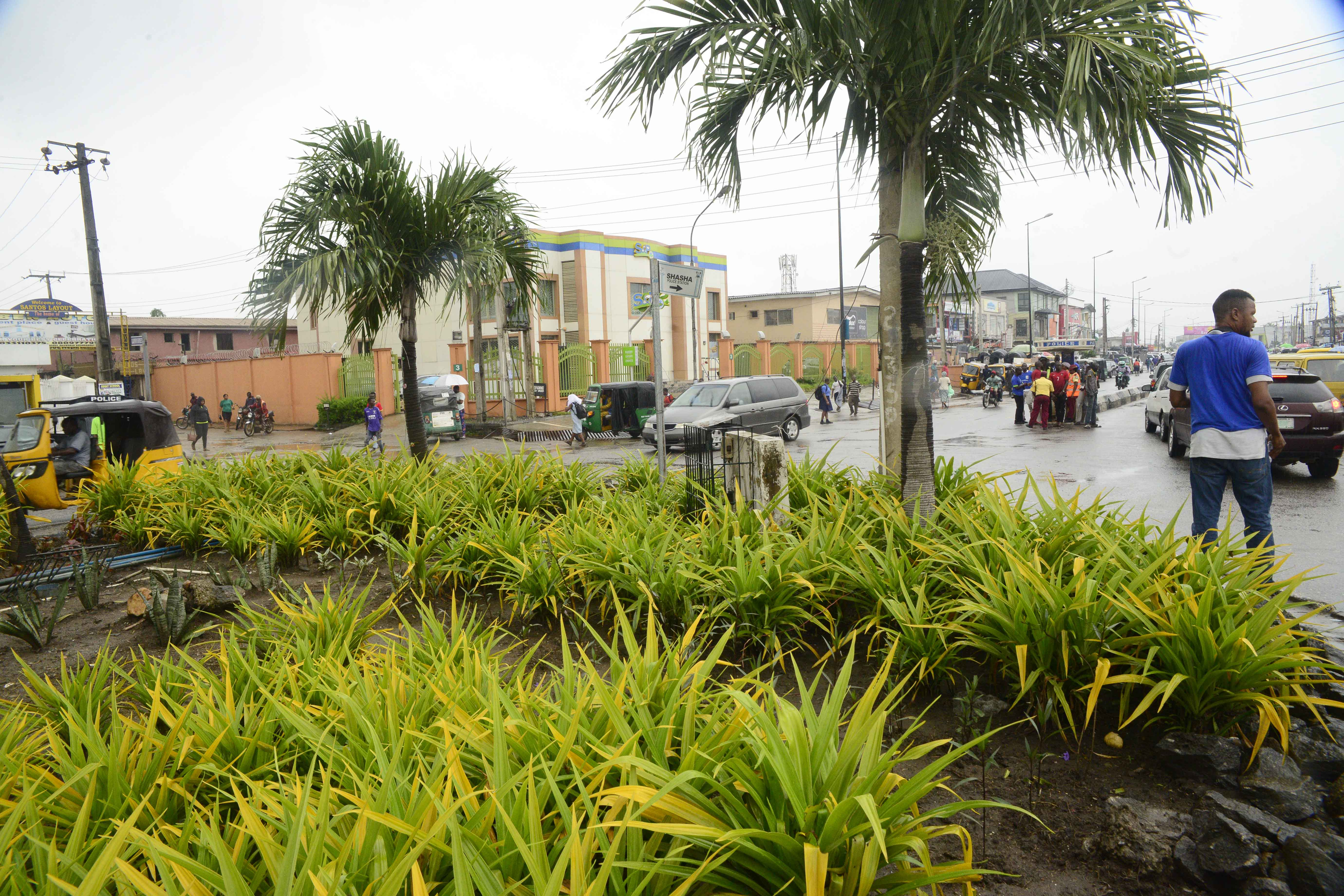
