= Lagos Bus Rapid Transit System =

Public transport system in Lagos State, Nigeria

Lagos BRT
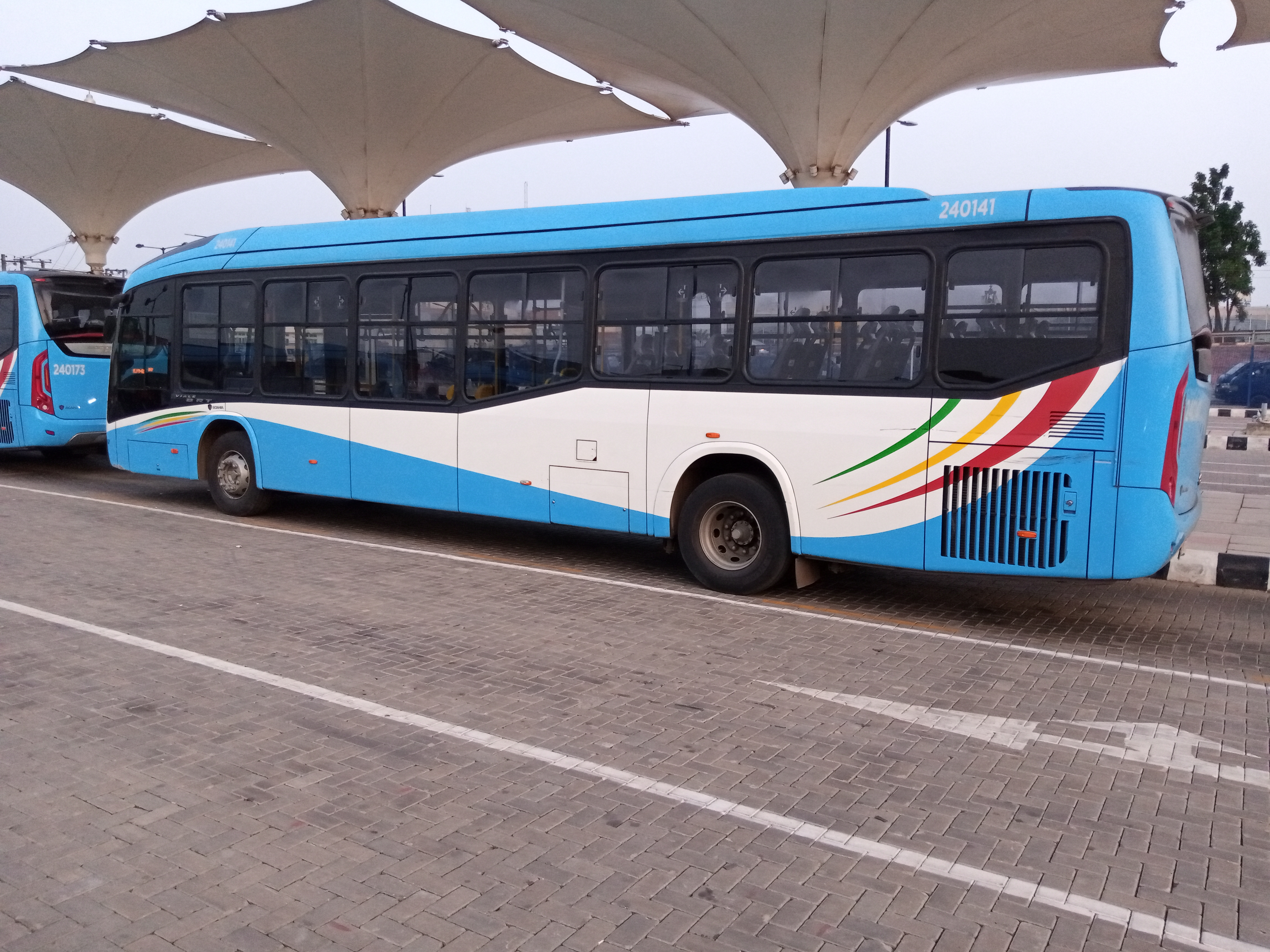

Overview
- Owner: Lagos Metropolitan Area Transport Authority
- Locale: Lagos, Nigeria
- Transit type: Bus rapid transit
- Number of lines: 1
- Number of stations: 28
- Website: www.lamata-ng.com

Operation
- Began operation: 17 March 2008

Technical
- System length: 22 km (14 mi)

The Lagos Bus Rapid Transit System, also known as Lagos BRT, is a bus rapid transit system in Lagos State. It is regulated by LAMATA and currently operated by multiple bus operating companies.

== First phase ==
The first phase of the Lagos BRT was opened on 17 March 2008, although it was initially slated for opening in November 2007. The initiative to build the system was initiated by the government of the previous governor, Bola Tinubu. It goes from Mile 12 through Ikorodu Road and Funsho Williams Avenue up to CMS. At the moment, the Lagos BRT Corridor has been extended from Mile 12 to Ikorodu, which is the second phase of BRT implementation. With the approval of Governor Akinwunmi Ambode, the construction of a new BRT corridor along Oshodi to Abule-Egba has commenced under the supervision of LAMATA.

26 bus shelters are offered along the Mile 12-CMS road; three bus terminals are also placed along the corridor (at Mile 12, Moshalashi and CMS), with the bus terminal at CMS designed to integrate with transport modes of rail and ferry that are planned for future construction by LAMATA.

According to The Nation on 14 August 2018, Mercedes Benz (MB do Brazil) is set to deliver 200 buses to Lagos by month end. A total of 800 buses from the first pack have been delivered in October 2018.

Lagos Governor, Babajide Sanwo-Olu has approved the creation of a specialized security team to oversee and enforce the state's Bus Rapid Transit (BRT) system as well as the safety of other transportation facilities.

== Bus routes ==
The Lagos Bus Rapid Transit (BRT), Primero Transport Services Ltd operates on twenty-six routes and recently lowered fares for along Ikorodu to TBS corridor because of the present realities. The BRT also recently activated digital electronic payment system using access control system too which was launched by the former Governor of Lagos State
