= Cow Skin (meat) =

Nigerian food made from cow skin

- Place of origin: Nigeria
- Main ingredients: Cow skin

Cow Skin is a Nigerian food made from processed cow skin. It is widely consumed across West Africa and is commonly used in soups, stews, and street food dishes. It is known as Kanda in the Northern part of Nigeria, and akpukpo anu in the Eastern part of Nigeria, Pomo in the Southwest,, and wele in Ghana. Cow skin is known for its chewy texture and ability to absorb the flavour of spices and sauces during cooking.

== Preparation ==
The food is prepared from its raw material—cattle skin after hair removal, traditionally done by casting the skin on fire and then washed thoroughly. It may then be cut into pieces and either boiled immediately or preserved through smoking or drying.

Different preparation methods exist across Nigeria.

== Legacy ==
Cow Skin is usually added to soups and stews. Its peppered form is sold on streets and in restaurants.

According to Public Health Nigeria, the meat-food contains collagen, lower in fat but contains less protein. Its nutritional defects has been a subject of debate by Nigerian health nutritionists, however, health officials has raised public awareness on the unsafe processing method employed by sole sellers.

Following the outbreak of Anthrax, Nigerian government urged the citizens not to eat meat—including pomo.
