= Mushin, Lagos =

Local government area in Lagos, Nigeria

Coordinates: 6°32′N 3°21′E

Mushin
- LGA and suburb
- Interactive map of Mushin
- Country: Nigeria
- State: Lagos State

Area
  - Total: 17 km^{2} (6.6 sq mi)

Population (2022)
  - Total: 935,400
  - Density: 55,000/km^{2} (140,000/sq mi)
- Time zone: UTC+1 (WAT)

Mushin is a Local Government Area in Lagos, Nigeria. It is located 10 km north of the city core, adjacent to the main road to Ikeja, and is largely a congested residential area with inadequate sanitation and low-quality housing. It had 633,009 inhabitants at the 2006 Census. It is also where a lot of A-list talents have risen from, artists such as Wande Coal.

== Infrastructure and demographics ==
After the 1960 independence of Nigeria from Great Britain, there were large migrations to the suburban areas. This led to intensive overcrowding. As a result, poor sanitation and inadequate housing led to poor living conditions. However, since the rise of industrialization in Nigeria, Mushin has become one of the largest beneficiaries of the industrial expansion. Mushin has local commercial enterprises which include: spinning and weaving of cotton, shoe manufacturing, bicycle and motorised-cycle assembly, along with the production of powdered milk. Once a staple source of revenue in Nigeria, agriculture is also a large central market.

The town is home to hospitals as well as educational facilities that extend to the secondary school level. Mushin lies at the intersection of roads from Lagos, Shomolu, and Ikeja. Most of its inhabitants are from the Yoruba tribe, and as a result Yoruba is the most spoken language.

== Boundary ==
- North – Oshodi/Apapa expressway from Oshodi to flyover leading to international airport to Oshodi exit into Agege motor road
- South – Boundary with Surulere Local Government at the other side of Bishop Street to include Akobi crescent, LUTH, Idi-Araba communities
- East – Agege motor road from Oshodi to Bishop street
- West – Oshodi – Apapa Expressway to Itire junction to include Itire-Ijesha communities in former Mushin Local Government.

== Localities ==
- Mushin Olosha

== Gallery ==
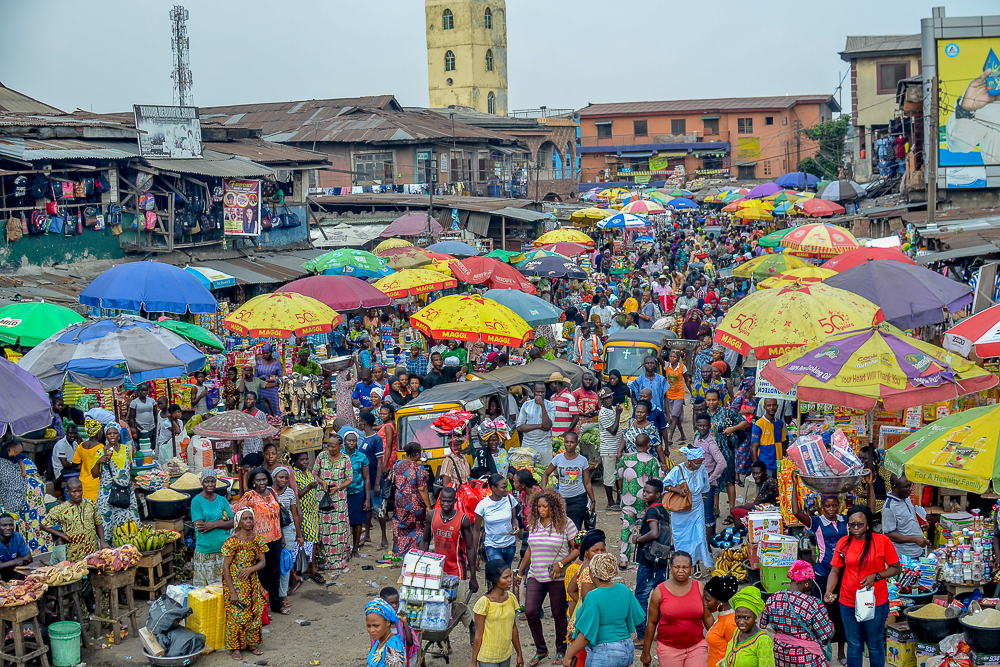

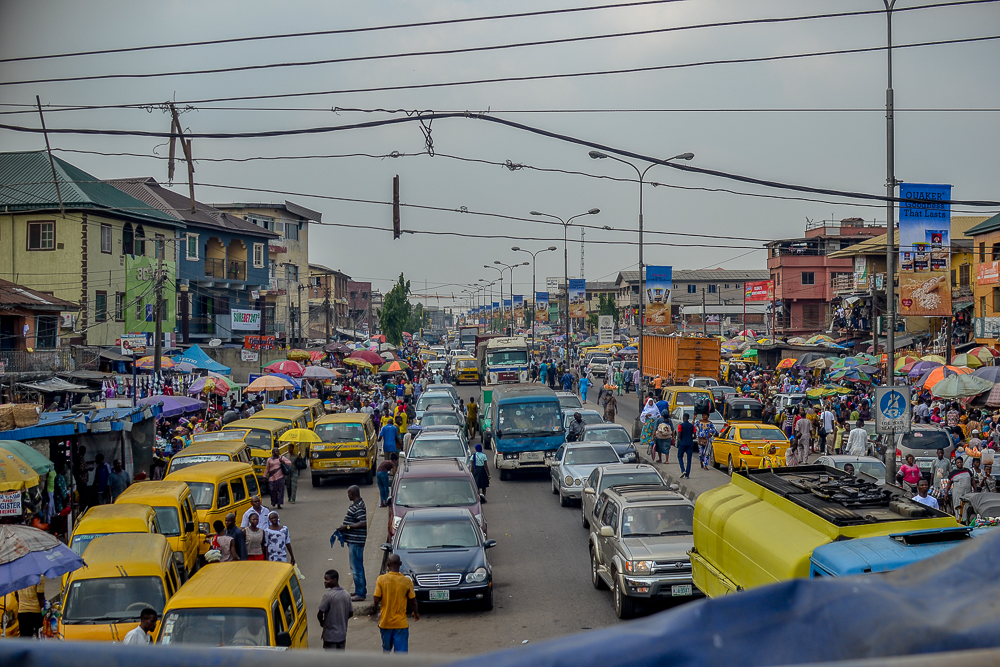

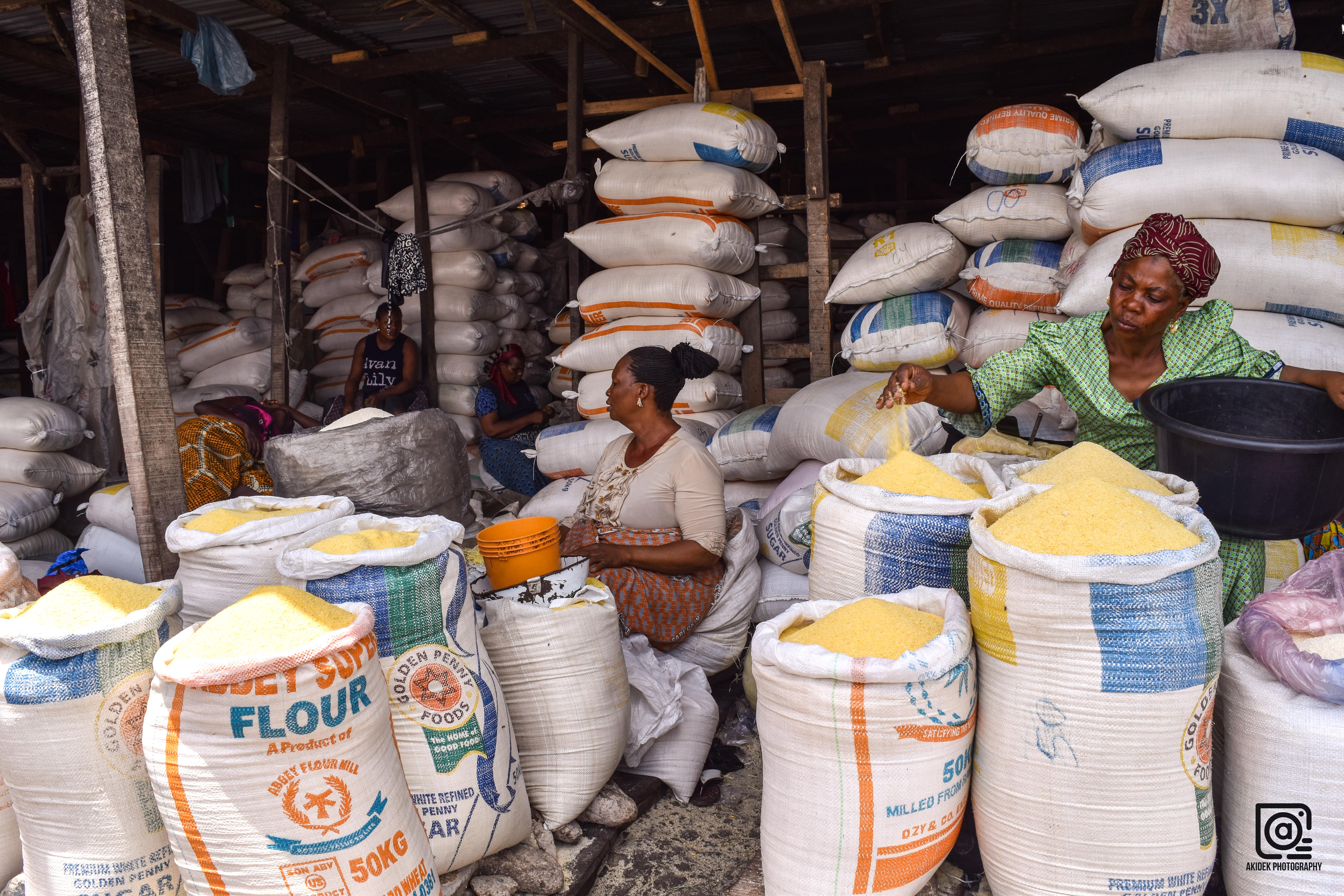

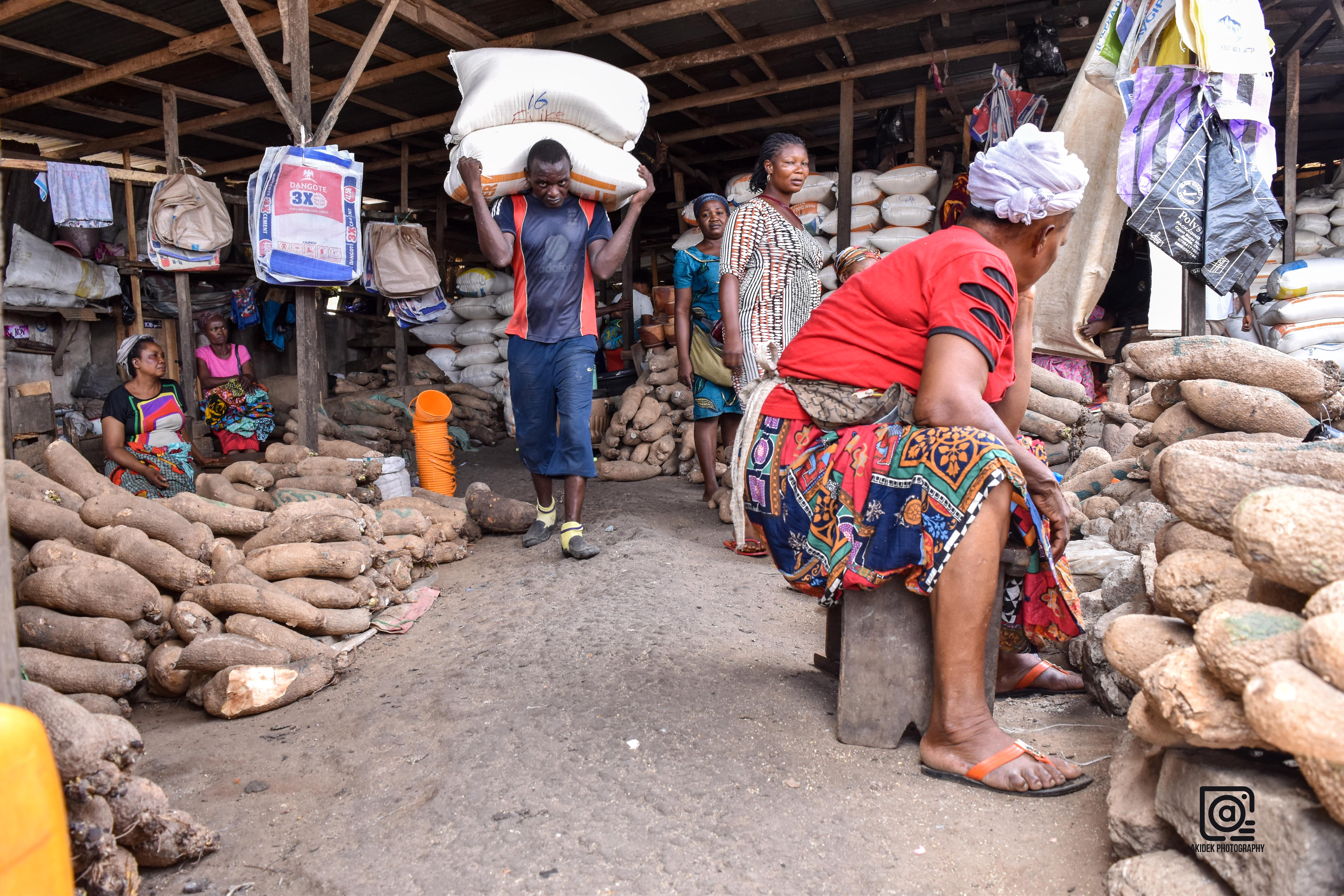

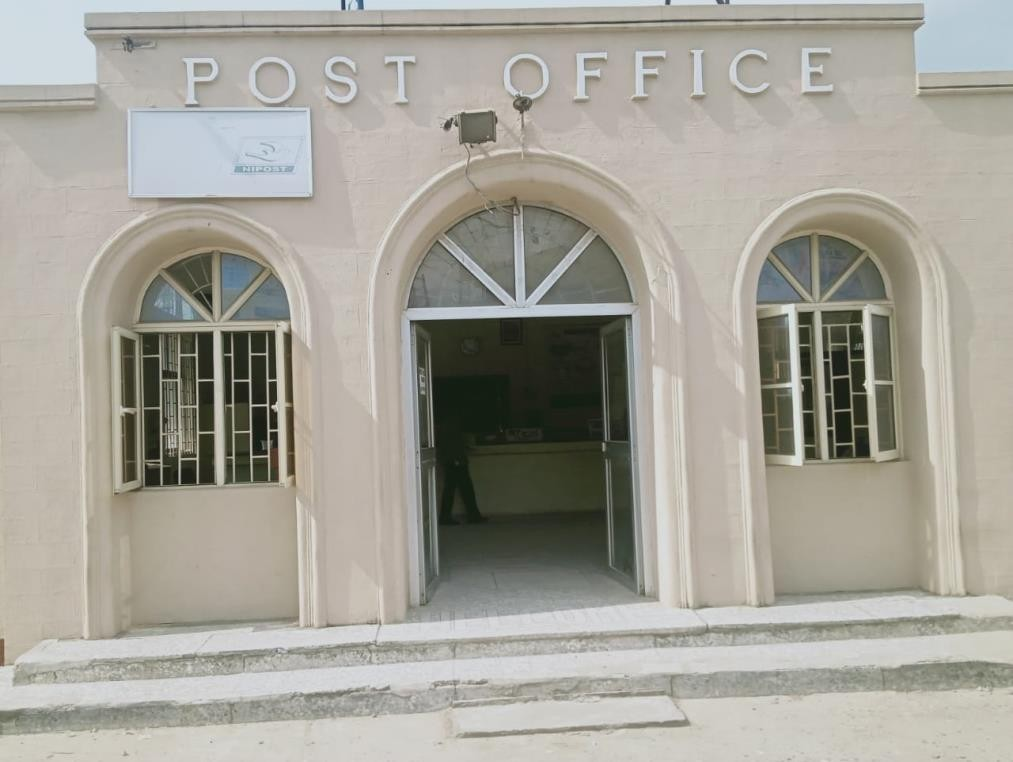
