= 2023 Nigerian Senate elections in Lagos State =

2023 Senate elections in Lagos

- 25 February 2023

All 3 Lagos State seats in the Senate of Nigeria
| | Majority party |
|---|---|
| Party | APC |
| Last election | 3 |
| Seats before | 3 |
| Seats won | 3 |
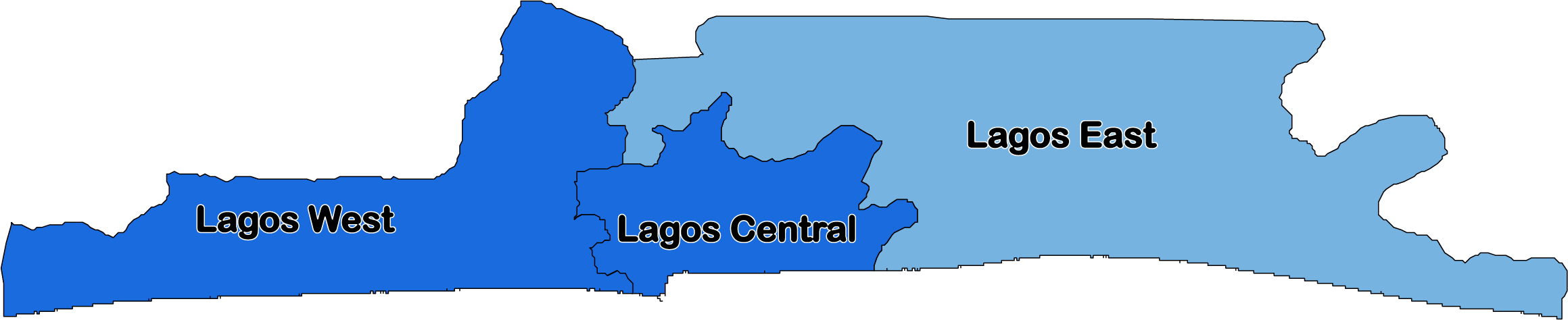
- APC incumbent retiring APC incumbent running for re-election

The 2023 Nigerian Senate elections in Lagos State was held on 25 February 2023, to elect the 3 federal Senators from Lagos State, one from each of the state's three senatorial districts. The elections coincided with the 2023 presidential election, as well as other elections to the Senate and elections to the House of Representatives; with state elections being held two weeks later. Primaries were held between 4 April and 9 June 2022.

== Background ==
In terms of the previous Senate elections, two of the three incumbent senators were returned as Oluremi Tinubu (APC-Central) and Solomon Olamilekan Adeola (APC-West) were re-elected while Gbenga Bareehu Ashafa (APC-East) lost renomination. In the Central district, Tinubu was re-elected with 58% of the vote as Adeola held his western seat with 53%; in the open East seat, Adebayo Osinowo held the seat for the APC with 59% of the vote. These results were a part of the continuation of the Lagos APC's dominance as most House of Representatives seats were won by the party, it won a majority in the House of Assembly, and Buhari won the state in the presidential election.

== Overview ==
| Affiliation | Party | Total |
| Affiliation | APC | Total |
|---|---|---|
| Previous Election | 3 | 3 |
| Before Election | 3 | 3 |
| After Election | 3 | 3 |

== Summary ==
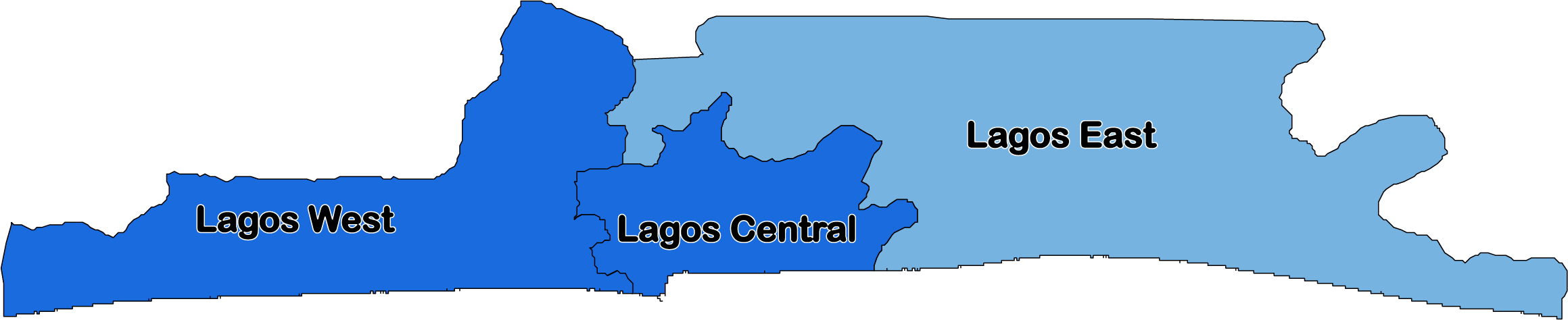
APC incumbent retiring APC incumbent running

| District | Incumbent | | Results | |
| District | Incumbent | Party | Status | Candidates |
|---|---|---|---|---|
| Lagos Central | Oluremi Tinubu | APC | Incumbent retired New member elected APC hold | ▌ ✓ Wasiu Eshinlokun Sanni (APC); ▌Wale Gomez (PDP) |
| Lagos East | Tokunbo Abiru | APC | Incumbent re-elected | ▌ ✓ Tokunbo Abiru (APC); ▌Nicholas Akobada (PDP) |
| Lagos West | Solomon Olamilekan Adeola | APC | Incumbent retired New member elected APC hold | ▌ ✓ Oluranti Adebule (APC); ▌Segun Adewale (PDP) |

== Lagos Central ==
2023 Lagos Central Senatorial District election
- 25 February 2023
| Nominee | Wasiu Eshinlokun Sanni | Wale Gomez |
| Party | APC | PDP |
| Popular vote | 131,828 | 69,320 |
Senator before election
Oluremi Tinubu
APC
Elected Senator
Wasiu Eshinlokun Sanni
APC

The Lagos Central Senatorial District covers the local government areas of Apapa, Eti-Osa, Lagos Island, Lagos Mainland, and Surulere. Incumbent Oluremi Tinubu (APC), who was re-elected with 52.9% of the vote in 2019, declined to seek re-election to focus on assisting the presidential campaign of her husband—former Governor Bola Tinubu (APC).

=== Primary elections ===
==== All Progressives Congress ====
On 20 April 2022, the APC National Executive Committee announced the party's schedule for senatorial primaries, setting its expression of interest form price at ₦3 million and nomination form price at ₦17 million with a 50% discount for candidates younger than 40 while women and candidates with disabilities get free nomination forms. Forms were to be sold from 26 April to 6 May until the deadline was later extended to 10 May then 12 May. After the submission of nomination forms by 13 May, candidates were screened by a party committee on 14 and 15 May while 18 May was the date for the screening appeal process. Ward congresses and LGA congresses were set for 16 and 17 May to elect delegates for the primary. Candidates approved by the screening process advanced to a primary set for 27 May, in concurrence with other APC senatorial primaries; challenges to the result could be made on 28 May.

After it was confirmed that Tinubu would retire from the Senate, four candidates emerged: Oyinlomo Danmole—former Commissioner for Home Affairs and Culture, Wasiu Eshinlokun Sanni—Deputy Speaker of the House of Assembly and MHA for Lagos Island I, Ademola Rasaq Seriki—former Ambassador to Spain, and Akeem Apatira. Another potential candidate—House of Assembly Speaker Mudashiru Obasa—was reportedly pushed out of the contest by party leadership and assuaged with a promised return to the HOA Speakership. In the primary—held at the Teslim Balogun Stadium in Surulere, Eshinlokun-Sanni defeated runner-up Seriki by 29% margin.

APC primary results
| Party | Candidate | Votes | % |
|---|---|---|---|
| APC | Wasiu Eshinlokun Sanni | 185 | 60.85% |
| APC | Ademola Rasaq Seriki | 97 | 31.91% |
| APC | Akeem Apatira | 22 | 7.24% |
| APC | Oyinlomo Danmole | 0 | 0.00% |
| Total votes | | 304 | 100.00% |
| Invalid or blank votes | | 0 | N/A |
| Turnout | | 304 | 98.06% |

==== People's Democratic Party ====
On 16 March 2022, the national PDP announced its senatorial primary timetable, setting its expression of interest form price at ₦1 million and the nomination form price at ₦20 million with a 50% discount for candidates between 25 and 30. Forms were to be sold until 1 April but the party later extended the deadline four times before reaching a final deadline of 22 April. After the submission of nomination forms by 25 April, candidates were screened by a party committee on 27 April while 2 May was the rescheduled date for the screening appeal process. Ward congresses were set for 29 April and LGA congresses were rescheduled for 10 May to elect delegates for the primary. Candidates approved by the screening process advanced to a primary set for 23 May, in concurrence with other PDP senatorial primaries but due to often violently enforced Monday stay-at-home orders by separatists, southeastern state parties held their primaries on 24 May; challenges to the result could be made on 25 May.

Before the primary, analysts noted three major candidates: Adesunbo Onitiri, Adetokunbo Pearse, and Wale Gomez with an anonymous party chieftain naming Onitiri—the 2019 nominee—as the frontrunner. However, on primary day, Gomez won the nomination amid massive controversy and protests as party officials had allegedly switched venues at the last minute.

=== General election ===
==== Results ====
2023 Lagos Central Senatorial District election
| Party | Candidate | Votes | % |
|---|---|---|---|
| ADC | Abayomi Omotayo Idowu | | |
| APC | Wasiu Eshinlokun-Sanni | | |
| BP | Tunde Bolarin | | |
| NRM | Francis Adekunle Owobiyi | | |
| New Nigeria Peoples Party | Raphael Oloke | | |
| PDP | Wale Gomez | | |
| SDP | Adeyinka Adelaja | | |
| YPP | Blessing Tunde Oladeji | | |
| ZLP | Princess Blessing Oji | | |
| Total votes | | | 100.00% |
| Invalid or blank votes | | | N/A |
| Turnout | | | |

== Lagos East ==
2023 Lagos East Senatorial District election
- 25 February 2023
| Nominee | Tokunbo Abiru | Nicholas Akobada |
| Party | APC | PDP |
| Popular vote | 178,646 | 80,249 |
| Percentage | 60.55% | 27.20% |
Senator before election
Tokunbo Abiru
APC
Elected Senator
Tokunbo Abiru
APC

The Lagos East Senatorial District covers the local government areas of Epe, Ibeju-Lekki, Ikorodu, Kosofe, and Somolu. In 2019, Adebayo Osinowo (APC) was elected to the seat but he died in June 2020. In the ensuing by-election, Tokunbo Abiru (APC) was elected with 87.2% of the vote; he is seeking re-election.

=== Primary elections ===
==== All Progressives Congress ====
On 20 April 2022, the APC National Executive Committee announced the party's schedule for senatorial primaries, setting its expression of interest form price at ₦3 million and nomination form price at ₦17 million with a 50% discount for candidates younger than 40 while women and candidates with disabilities get free nomination forms. Forms were to be sold from 26 April to 6 May until the deadline was later extended to 10 May then 12 May. After the submission of nomination forms by 13 May, candidates were screened by a party committee on 14 and 15 May while 18 May was the date for the screening appeal process. Ward congresses and LGA congresses were set for 16 and 17 May to elect delegates for the primary. Candidates approved by the screening process advanced to a primary set for 27 May, in concurrence with other APC senatorial primaries; challenges to the result could be made on 28 May.

On the primary date, an indirect primary in Magodo resulted in the renomination of Abiru unopposed. In his acceptance speech, Abiru praised party members and promised to do more for the district.

APC primary results
| Party | Candidate | Votes | % |
|---|---|---|---|
| APC | Tokunbo Abiru | 344 | 100.00% |
| Total votes | | 344 | 100.00% |
| Invalid or blank votes | | 0 | N/A |
| Turnout | | 344 | Unknown |

==== People's Democratic Party ====
On 16 March 2022, the national PDP announced its senatorial primary timetable, setting its expression of interest form price at ₦1 million and the nomination form price at ₦20 million with a 50% discount for candidates between 25 and 30. Forms were to be sold until 1 April but the party later extended the deadline four times before reaching a final deadline of 22 April. After the submission of nomination forms by 25 April, candidates were screened by a party committee on 27 April while 2 May was the rescheduled date for the screening appeal process. Ward congresses were set for 29 April and LGA congresses were rescheduled for 10 May to elect delegates for the primary. Candidates approved by the screening process advanced to a primary set for 23 May, in concurrence with other PDP senatorial primaries but due to often violently enforced Monday stay-at-home orders by separatists, southeastern state parties held their primaries on 24 May; challenges to the result could be made on 25 May.

On the primary date, four candidates contested an indirect primary in Somolu that ended in Nicholas Akobada winning the nomination after results showed him defeating runner-up Agnes Adenike-Shobajo by an 11-vote margin. However, the primary was marred by controversy over alleged irregularities and a purportedly manipulated delegate list.

PDP primary results
| Party | Candidate | Votes | % |
|---|---|---|---|
| PDP | Nicholas Akobada | 74 | 47.74% |
| PDP | Agnes Adenike-Shobajo | 63 | 40.65% |
| PDP | Obadiaru Adebayo | 16 | 10.32% |
| PDP | Saidat Odoffin-Fafowora | 2 | 1.29% |
| Total votes | | 155 | 100.00% |

=== Campaign ===
Analysis from The Nation in late December 2022 gave the advantage to Abiru, in large part to the relatively little active campaigning conducted by Akobada.

=== General election ===
==== Results ====
2023 Lagos East Senatorial District election
| Party | Candidate | Votes | % |
|---|---|---|---|
| A | Ehijele Benedict Imumolen | | |
| ADC | George Olalekan Honey Ashiru | | |
| APC | Tokunbo Abiru | | |
| BP | Temitope Temitayo Olowolayemo | | |
| NRM | Christopher O. Ediale | | |
| New Nigeria Peoples Party | Nurudeen Folohunsho Lawal | | |
| PDP | Nicholas Akobada | | |
| SDP | Mayowa Oluwaranmilow | | |
| YPP | Charles Imuenoghomwen Obadiaru | | |
| Total votes | | | 100.00% |
| Invalid or blank votes | | | N/A |
| Turnout | | | |

== Lagos West ==
2023 Lagos West Senatorial District election
- 25 February 2023
| Nominee | Oluranti Adebule | Segun Adewale |
| Party | APC | PDP |
| Popular vote | 361,296 | 248,653 |
| Percentage | 59.23% | 40.77% |
Senator before election
Solomon Olamilekan Adeola
APC
Elected Senator
Oluranti Adebule
APC

The Lagos West Senatorial District covers the local government areas of Agege, Ajeromi-Ifelodun, Alimosho, Amuwo-Odofin, Badagry, Ifako-Ijaiye, Ikeja, Mushin, Ojo, and Oshodi-Isolo. Incumbent Solomon Olamilekan Adeola (APC) was re-elected with 53.3% of the vote in 2019. In April 2022, Adeola announced that he would run for the Ogun West senate seat instead of seeking re-election to his current seat.

=== Primary elections ===
==== All Progressives Congress ====
On 20 April 2022, the APC National Executive Committee announced the party's schedule for senatorial primaries, setting its expression of interest form price at ₦3 million and nomination form price at ₦17 million with a 50% discount for candidates younger than 40 while women and candidates with disabilities get free nomination forms. Forms were to be sold from 26 April to 6 May until the deadline was later extended to 10 May then 12 May. After the submission of nomination forms by 13 May, candidates were screened by a party committee on 14 and 15 May while 18 May was the date for the screening appeal process. Ward congresses and LGA congresses were set for 16 and 17 May to elect delegates for the primary. Candidates approved by the screening process advanced to a primary set for 27 May, in concurrence with other APC senatorial primaries; challenges to the result could be made on 28 May.

After Adeola announced that he was vacating the seat, the immediate frontrunner in the primary was Musiliu Obanikoro—former Senator and former Minister of State for Defence; however, state party leadership instead backed former Deputy Governor Adejoke Orelope-Adefulire for the seat. However, Orelope-Adefulire did not return the primary forms and suddenly withdrew from the contest, pushing state party leadership to draft another former Deputy Governor—Oluranti Adebule—as a candidate. However, the deadline for candidate entry had already passed and the sudden Adebule candidacy led to controversy. On the primary date, results showed victory for Adebule over Obanikoro by a significant margin of 55%. Adebule thanked delegates in her acceptance speech and promised quality representation. For his part, Obanikoro walked out of the venue and later claimed that Adebule was not eligible to run in the primary. In a purported attempt to placate Obanikoro, Lagos APC leadership pressured its Eti-Osa Federal Constituency nominee Oyekanmi Elegushi to withdraw for Ibrahim Babajide Obanikoro—Musiliu Obanikoro's son and the runner-up in the Eti-Osa APC primary.

APC primary results
| Party | Candidate | Votes | % |
|---|---|---|---|
| APC | Oluranti Adebule | 424 | 76.12% |
| APC | Musiliu Obanikoro | 119 | 21.37% |
| APC | Kayode Opeifa | 14 | 2.51% |
| Total votes | | 557 | 100.00% |
| Invalid or blank votes | | 10 | N/A |
| Turnout | | 567 | Unknown |

==== People's Democratic Party ====
On 16 March 2022, the national PDP announced its senatorial primary timetable, setting its expression of interest form price at ₦1 million and the nomination form price at ₦20 million with a 50% discount for candidates between 25 and 30. Forms were to be sold until 1 April but the party later extended the deadline four times before reaching a final deadline of 22 April. After the submission of nomination forms by 25 April, candidates were screened by a party committee on 27 April while 2 May was the rescheduled date for the screening appeal process. Ward congresses were set for 29 April and LGA congresses were rescheduled for 10 May to elect delegates for the primary. Candidates approved by the screening process advanced to a primary set for 23 May, in concurrence with other PDP senatorial primaries but due to often violently enforced Monday stay-at-home orders by separatists, southeastern state parties held their primaries on 24 May; challenges to the result could be made on 25 May.

Before the primary, observers noted potential issues with both candidates as frontrunner Segun Adewale had previously contested several elections in his native Ekiti State while Yommy Ogungbe is from the Badagry area just like gubernatorial candidate Abdul-Azeez Olajide Adediran; after three terms of Adeola, an anonymous party member surmised that some voters may prefer an indigene senator while pundits doubted that both a senatorial and gubernatorial nominee could emerged from the same area. Reporting also noted Adewale's multiple electoral defeats and legal issues. In the primary, Adewale defeated Ogungbe by a wide margin; in his acceptance speech, Adewale thanked delegates and pledged to work with party members to win the general election.

PDP primary results
| Party | Candidate | Votes | % |
|---|---|---|---|
| PDP | Segun Adewale | 264 | 99.25% |
| PDP | Yommy Ogungbe | 2 | 0.75% |
| Total votes | | 266 | 100.00% |
| Invalid or blank votes | | 2 | N/A |
| Turnout | | 268 | 75.28% |

=== Campaign ===
Analysis from The Guardian in December 2022, labeled Adebule as the frontrunner due to APC strength in the area but noted Adewale's experience in the district. A piece from The Africa Report in January echoed those sentiments; however, it pointed out opportunities for Adewale: namely, the district's high non-indigene population (a PDP-leaning demographic) and Interior Minister Rauf Aregbesola's discontent with his own APC (Aregbesola has large amounts of supporters in Alimosho). Analysts contended that if Aregbesola backed Adewale and/or Adewale successfully convinced most Labour Party supporters to vote for him on the senatorial line, Adewale had a chance.

=== General election ===
==== Results ====
2023 Lagos West Senatorial District election
| Party | Candidate | Votes | % |
|---|---|---|---|
| A | Charles Kolawole James | | |
| ADP | Olufeyikemi Olaojo | | |
| ADC | Muhammed Mutairu Ogidi | | |
| APC | Oluranti Adebule | | |
| BP | Akintomide Olumide Ogunlegan | | |
| NRM | Anthony Nelson Olokor | | |
| New Nigeria Peoples Party | Mustapha Oladapo Dabiri | | |
| PDP | Segun Adewale | | |
| SDP | Tolulope Osundolire | | |
| ZLP | Anthony Emereole | | |
| Total votes | | | 100.00% |
| Invalid or blank votes | | | N/A |
| Turnout | | | |

== See also ==
- 2023 Nigerian Senate election
- 2023 Nigerian elections
