= List of first ladies of Nigerian states =

The first lady of the 36 states in Nigeria is the advisor to the governor and often plays a role in social activism. The position is traditionally held by the wife of the state governor. During the administration of Mohammed Buhari, President of Nigeria in 2015, the Office of the First Lady was nullified.

== Lists of current First Ladies ==
State	First Ladies	Governor	Refs
Abia State	Priscilla Otti	Alex Otti	
Adamawa State	Hajiya Lami Fintiri	Ahmadu Umaru Fintiri	
Akwa Ibom State	Helen Obareki (Note: Governor's daughter appointed after death of wife.)	Umo Eno	
Anambra State	Nonye Soludo	Charles Chukwuma Soludo	
Bauchi State	Hajiya Aisha Bala Mohammed	Bala Mohammed	
Bayelsa State	Gloria Diri	Douye Diri	
Benue State	Vacant (Note: Benue State does not currently have a First Lady as the current governor is a former Catholic priest. However the administration works with the Office of the First Lady of Nigeria, known as the 'mother of the State'.)	Hyacinth Alia	
Borno State	Falmata Babagana Umara Zulum	Babagana Umara Zulum	
Cross River State	Eyoanwan-Itam Bassey Otu	Bassey Otu	
Delta State	Tobore Oborevwori	Sheriff Oborevwori	
Ebonyi State	Mary-Maudline Nwifuru	Francis Nwifuru	
Edo State	Edesili Anani Okpebholo	Monday Okpebholo	
Ekiti State	Dr. Olayemi Oyebanji	Biodun Oyebanji	
Enugu State	Nkechinyere Mbah	Peter Mbah	
Gombe State	Hajiya Asma'u Inuwa Yahaya	Muhammad Inuwa Yahaya	
Imo State	Chioma Uzodinma	Hope Uzodinma	
Jigawa State	Hajiya Amina Umar Namadi	Umar Namadi	
Kaduna State	Hafsat Uba Sani	Uba Sani	
Kano State	Hajiya Maryam Abba Kabir Yusuf	Abba Kabir Yusuf	
Katsina State	Hajiya Zulaihat Dikko Umar Radda	Dikko Umaru Radda	
Kebbi State	Hajia Zainab Nasare Nasir Idris	Nasir Idris	
Kogi State	Hajia Sefinat Usman Ododo	Yahaya Bello	
Kwara State	Olufolake Abdulrazaq	AbdulRahman AbdulRazaq	
Lagos State	Ibijoke Sanwo-Olu	Babajide Sanwo-Olu	
Nasarawa State	Hajiya Silifa Abdullahi A. Sule	Abdullahi Sule	
Niger State	Fatima Mohammed Bago	Mohammed Umar Bago	
Ogun State	Bamidele Abiodun	Dapo Abiodun	
Ondo State	Rather Oluwaseun Aiyedatiwa	Lucky Aiyedatiwa	
Osun State	Titilola Adeleke	Ademola Adeleke	
Oyo State	Tamunominini Makinde	Seyi Makinde	
Plateau State	Helen Mutfwang	Caleb Mutfwang	
Rivers State	Valerie Fubara	Siminalayi Fubara	
Sokoto State	Fatima Ahmad Aliyu	Ahmad Aliyu	
Taraba State	Agyin Agbu Kefas	Agbu Kefas	
Yobe State	Gumsu Abacha Buni	Mai Mala Buni	
Zamfara State	Hajiya Huriyya Dauda Lawal	Dauda Lawal	

== Former ==
- Bolanle Ambode
- Abimbola Fashola
- Oluremi Tinubu
- Mercy Odochi Orji
- Judith Amaechi
- Mary Odili
- Rose A. George
