= 2015 Nigerian Senate elections in Lagos State =

The 2015 Nigerian Senate election in Lagos State was held on March 28, 2015, to elect members of the Nigerian Senate to represent Lagos State. Oluremi Tinubu representing Lagos Central, Gbenga Bareehu Ashafa representing Lagos East and Solomon Olamilekan Adeola representing Lagos West all won on the platform of All Progressives Congress.

== Overview ==
Affiliation	Party		Total
Affiliation	APC	ACN	Total
Before Election	0	3	3
After Election	3	0	3

== Summary ==
District	Incumbent	Party	Elected Senator	Party
Lagos Central	Oluremi Tinubu	ACN	Oluremi Tinubu	APC
Lagos West	Ganiyu Solomon	ACN	Solomon Olamilekan Adeola	APC
Lagos East	Gbenga Bareehu Ashafa	ACN	Gbenga Bareehu Ashafa	APC

== Results ==
=== Lagos Central ===
The two major parties All Progressives Congress and People's Democratic Party registered with the Independent National Electoral Commission to contest in the election. ACN candidate Oluremi Tinubu won the election, defeating PDP candidate Dosunmu Adegboyega and other party candidates.

2015 Nigerian Senate election in Lagos State
Party	Candidate	Votes	%
APC	Oluremi Tinubu	-	-
PDP	Adegboyega Dosunmu	-	-

=== Lagos East ===
The two major parties All Progressives Congress and People's Democratic Party registered with the Independent National Electoral Commission to contest in the election. ACN candidate Gbenga Bareehu Ashafa won the election, defeating PDP candidate Olabisi Salis-Fakos and other party candidates.

2015 Nigerian Senate election in Lagos State
Party	Candidate	Votes	%
APC	Gbenga Bareehu Ashafa	-	-
PDP	Olabisi Salis-Fakos	-	-

=== Lagos West ===
The two major parties All Progressives Congress and People's Democratic Party registered with the Independent National Electoral Commission to contest in the election. ACN candidate Solomon Olamilekan Adeola won the election, defeating PDP candidate Segun "Aeroland" Adewale and other party candidates.

2015 Nigerian Senate election in Lagos State
Party	Candidate	Votes	%
APC	Solomon Olamilekan Adeola	-	-
PDP	Segun "Aeroland" Adewale	-	-
