= 2011 Nigerian Senate elections in Lagos State =

The 2011 Nigerian Senate election in Lagos State was held on April 11, 2015, to elect members of the Nigerian Senate to represent Lagos State. Oluremi Tinubu representing Lagos Central, Gbenga Bareehu Ashafa representing Lagos East and Ganiyu Solomon representing Lagos West all won on the platform of Action Congress of Nigeria.

== Overview ==
Affiliation	Party		Total
Affiliation	ACN	PDP	Total
Before Election	3	0	3
After Election	3	0	3

== Summary ==
District	Incumbent	Party	Elected Senator	Party
Lagos Central	Munirudeen Adekunle Muse	ACN	Oluremi Tinubu	ACN
Lagos West	Adeleke Mamora	ACN	Ganiyu Solomon	ACN
Lagos East	Ganiyu Solomon	ACN	Gbenga Bareehu Ashafa	ACN

== Results ==
=== Lagos Central ===
The two major parties Action Congress of Nigeria and People's Democratic Party registered with the Independent National Electoral Commission to contest in the election. ACN candidate Oluremi Tinubu won the election, defeating PDP candidate Tolagbe Animashaun and other party candidates.

2011 Nigerian Senate election in Lagos State
Party	Candidate	Votes	%
ACN	Oluremi Tinubu		
People's Democratic Party	Tolagbe Animashaun		
Total votes			
ACN hold			

=== Lagos East ===
The two major parties Action Congress of Nigeria and People's Democratic Party registered with the Independent National Electoral Commission to contest in the election. ACN candidate Gbenga Bareehu Ashafa won the election, defeating PDP candidate Al-mustain Abani Vonda and other party candidates.

2011 Nigerian Senate election in Lagos State
Party	Candidate	Votes	%
ACN	Gbenga Bareehu Ashafa		
People's Democratic Party	Al-Mustain Abani		
Total votes			
ACN hold			

=== Lagos West ===
The two major parties Action Congress of Nigeria and People's Democratic Party registered with the Independent National Electoral Commission to contest in the election. ACN candidate Ganiyu Solomon won the election, defeating PDP candidate M. Salvador and other party candidates.

2011 Nigerian Senate election in Lagos State
Party	Candidate	Votes	%
ACN	Ganiyu Solomon		
People's Democratic Party	M. Salvador		
Total votes			
ACN hold			
