= 1999 Nigerian Senate elections in Lagos State =

The 1999 Nigerian Senate election in Lagos State was held on February 20, 1999, to elect members of the Nigerian Senate to represent Lagos State. Wahab Dosunmu representing Lagos Central, Tokunbo Afikuyomi representing Lagos West and Seye Ogunlewe representing Lagos East all won on the platform of the Alliance for Democracy.

== Overview ==
Affiliation	Party		Total
Affiliation	PDP	AD	Total
Before Election			3
After Election	0	3	3

== Summary ==
District	Incumbent	Party	Elected Senator	Party
Lagos Central			Wahab Dosunmu	AD
Lagos West			Tokunbo Afikuyomi	AD
Lagos East			Seye Ogunlewe	AD

== Results ==
=== Lagos Central ===
The election was won by Wahab Dosunmu of the Alliance for Democracy.

1999 Nigerian Senate election in Lagos State
Party	Candidate	Votes	%
AD	Wahab Dosunmu		
Total votes			
AD hold			

=== Lagos West ===
The election was won by Tokunbo Afikuyomi of the Alliance for Democracy.

1999 Nigerian Senate election in Lagos State
Party	Candidate	Votes	%
AD	Tokunbo Afikuyomi		
Total votes			
AD hold			

=== Lagos East ===
The election was won by Seye Ogunlewe of the Alliance for Democracy.

1999 Nigerian Senate election in Lagos State
Party	Candidate	Votes	%
AD	Seye Ogunlewe		
Total votes			
AD hold			
