= 2007 Nigerian Senate elections in Lagos State =

The 2007 Nigerian Senate election in Lagos State was held on 21 April 2007, to elect members of the Nigerian Senate to represent Lagos State. Munirudeen Adekunle Muse representing Lagos Central, Adeleke Mamora representing Lagos East and Ganiyu Solomon representing Lagos West all won on the platform of the Action Congress

== Overview ==
Affiliation	Party		Total
Affiliation	AC	PDP	Total
Before Election			3
After Election	3	0	3

== Summary ==
District	Incumbent	Party	Elected Senator	Party
Lagos Central			Munirudeen Adekunle Muse	AC
Lagos East			Adeleke Mamora	AC
Lagos West			Ganiyu Solomon	AC

== Results ==
=== Lagos Central ===
The election was won by Munirudeen Adekunle Muse of the Action Congress.

2007 Nigerian Senate election in Lagos State
Party	Candidate	Votes	%
AC	Munirudeen Adekunle Muse		
Total votes			
AC hold			

=== Lagos East ===
The election was won by Adeleke Mamora of the Action Congress.

2007 Nigerian Senate election in Lagos State
Party	Candidate	Votes	%
AC	Adeleke Mamora		
Total votes			
AC hold			

=== Lagos West ===
The election was won by Ganiyu Solomon of the Action Congress.

2007 Nigerian Senate election in Lagos State
Party	Candidate	Votes	%
AC	Ganiyu Solomon		
Total votes			
AC hold			
