= Committee of Wives of Lagos State Officials =

Ibijoke Sanwo-Olu speaking at the Pre-Event Press Conference Oct 2025

The Committee of Wives of Lagos State Officials (COWLSO) is a gender-based community organisation dedicated to complementing the Lagos State Government’s efforts, with a primary focus on women and child welfare as well as the protection of the Lagos environment.

== History ==
COWLSO was established in 1974 by late Mrs. Obafunmilayo Johnson, wife of the first Military Governor of Lagos State. After a period of inactivity, the organisation was revived in the year 2000 by Senator Oluremi Tinubu.

== Programmes and Activities ==
=== National Women’s Conference ===
During its 24th National Women’s Conference, COWLSO was recognised for its contributions to community development, particularly in healthcare, education, and women’s empowerment. The Chairperson, Dr. Ibijoke Sanwo-Olu, highlighted that the organisation’s focus has expanded from infrastructural development to include capacity building and creating greater opportunities for women.

The committee held its 25th Annual National Women’s Conference from October 28–30, 2025, at Eko Hotels and Suites, Victoria Island, Lagos, themed "25 Years of Visionary Legacy: Inspiring the Next Generation." It was hosted by Ibijoke Sanwo-Olu and Oluremi Hamzat, the event celebrated 25 years of women’s empowerment, mentorship, and leadership.

=== Free Medical Outreach ===
As part of activities marking the 25th National Women’s Conference, COWLSO launched a Free Medical Outreach across Lagos communities to promote accessible healthcare. The outreach commenced in Mushin from August 5 to 6, continued in Makoko from August 19 to 20, and concluded in Epe from September 2 to 3, 2025.

The programme offered free medical screenings and consultations for hypertension, diabetes, hepatitis, tuberculosis, eye, cervical, breast, and dental health, alongside health education. Dr. Ibijoke Sanwo-Olu urged residents to adopt healthy lifestyles and commended the Renewed Hope Initiative of Senator Oluremi Tinubu for its nationwide health impact.

In Makoko, the outreach, themed "Healthy for All: Bridging Gaps, Building a Healthy Future," aimed to reduce health disparities and improve access to healthcare services. It was aligned with Lagos State’s public health policies and commended by Bayo Adefuye, Chairman of Yaba LCDA, for promoting equitable healthcare access.

=== Community Empowerment Initiatives ===
To commemorate its 25th anniversary, COWLSO partnered with Parallex Bank to promote financial inclusion and youth development. The collaboration featured the donation of 100 Point of Sale (POS) machines, seed capital grants, and financial literacy training sessions held at the Lagos State First Lady’s Office. According to Frank Alarapon, Chief Digital Officer of Parallex Bank, the initiative aligns with the bank’s mission to empower young Nigerians. Dr. Ibijoke Sanwo-Olu described the project as a sustainable investment in human capacity.

COWLSO launched an initiative themed “No Limits, Just Possibilities,” designed to promote inclusion, empowerment, and access to essential resources for children and adults with disabilities. The programme began in Badagry and Ikorodu, with plans to extend across Lagos State’s five administrative divisions. Activities included the distribution of educational and assistive materials, recreational programmes, and empowerment sessions for parents and caregivers.
