= Fashola =

- Gender: Male
- Language: Yoruba

Origin
- Origin: Nigerian
- Region of origin: South-West Nigeria

Fashola is a Nigerian surname of Yoruba origin. Notable people with the surname include:

- Babatunde Fashola (born 1963), 13th Governor of Lagos State and current Minister of Works & Housing in Nigeria
- Abimbola Fashola (born 1965), wife of Babatunde Fashola
- Azeez Adeshina Fashola (born 1991), Nigerian singer and songwriter known by the stage name Naira Marley
