= Ainojie Alex Irune =

Nigerian Business executive

Ainojie ‘Alex’ Irune
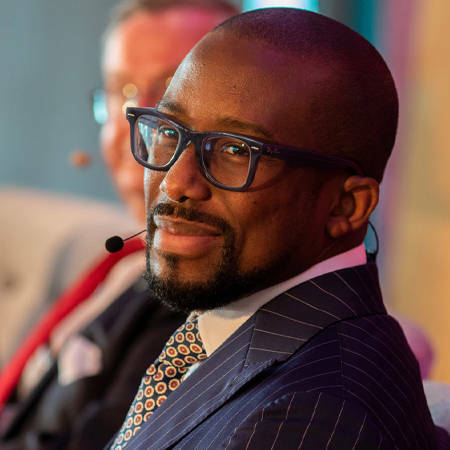
- Dr. Ainojie 'Alex' Irune speaking at Africa Oil Week 2019.
- Born: Ainojie Irune
- Education: University of Nottingham (Computer Science BSc), University of Nottingham (PhD)
- Occupations: Managing Director of Oando Energy Resources Nigeria Limited and Group Executive Director Oando (2019–present)

Ainojie "Alex" Irune is a Nigerian business executive and strategist. He is the Managing Director of Oando Energy Resources Nigeria Limited (OERNL), an Exploration and Production company in the Nigerian energy sector (an upstream subsidiary of Oando) and an executive director of Oando Plc.

Irune oversees Oando Energy Resources' operational oversight of its 16 onshore and offshore assets across Nigeria and São Tomé and Príncipe.

== Early life and education ==
Irune studied Computer Science at the University of Nottingham graduating in 2002. He also obtained a PhD in Computer Science from the same university in 2009.

== Career ==
Irune started his career as a researcher and In-Vehicle Systems Designer working with car manufacturers (Honda, Nissan and Jaguar Land Rover) and the University of Nottingham in the United Kingdom.

In 2011, he joined Oando, working in cross-functional roles including serving as the Head of Corporate Communications between 2013 and 2016. In this role, he oversaw all internal and external brand-building efforts across the company's business entities including the communications strategy following Oando's $1.5bn acquisition of ConocoPhillips Nigeria's upstream assets.

Irune joined the Oando Energy Resources (OER's) management in 2018 following his previous role as the Group Chief Strategy & Corporate Services Officer at Oando PLC between 2016 and 2018.
