= 1983 Kwara State gubernatorial election =

1983 gubernatorial election in Kwara State, Nigeria

- August 13, 1983
Nominee	Cornelius Adebayo
Party	UPN
Elected Governor
Cornelius Adebayo
UPN

The 1983 Kwara State gubernatorial election occurred on August 13, 1983. UPN candidate Cornelius Adebayo won the election.

== Results ==
Cornelius Adebayo representing UPN won the election. The election held on August 13, 1983.
