= 2003 Nigerian Senate elections in Lagos State =

2003 Nigerian Senate election in Lagos State

The 2003 Nigerian Senate election in Lagos State was held on April 12, 2003, to elect members of the Nigerian Senate to represent Lagos State. Musiliu Obanikoro representing Lagos Central, Tokunbo Afikuyomi representing Lagos West and Adeleke Mamora representing Lagos East all won on the platform of the Alliance for Democracy.

== Overview ==
Affiliation	Party		Total
Affiliation	PDP	AD	Total
Before Election			3
After Election	0	3	3

== Summary ==
District	Incumbent	Party	Elected Senator	Party
Lagos Central			Musiliu Obanikoro	AD
Lagos West			Tokunbo Afikuyomi	AD
Lagos East			Adeleke Mamora	AD

== Results ==
=== Lagos Central ===
The election was won by Musiliu Obanikoro of the Alliance for Democracy.

2003 Nigerian Senate election in Lagos State
Party	Candidate	Votes	%
AD	Musiliu Obanikoro		
Total votes			
AD hold			

=== Lagos West ===
The election was won by Tokunbo Afikuyomi of the Alliance for Democracy.

2003 Nigerian Senate election in Lagos State
Party	Candidate	Votes	%
AD	Tokunbo Afikuyomi		
Total votes			
AD hold			

=== Lagos East ===
The election was won by Adeleke Mamora of the Alliance for Democracy.

2003 Nigerian Senate election in Lagos State
Party	Candidate	Votes	%
AD	Adeleke Mamora		
Total votes			
AD hold			
