= Adeseye Ogunlewe =

Nigerian politician

Omoba Adeseye Ogunlewe

Minister of Works
- In office July 2003 – March 2006
- President: Olusegun Obasanjo
- Succeeded by: Yahaya Abdulkarim

Senator for Lagos East
- In office 3 June 1999 – 3 June 2003
- Preceded by: Anthony Adefuye (1993)
- Succeeded by: Adeleke Mamora

Personal details
- Born: Kingsley Adeseye Ogunlewe
- Party: Peoples Democratic Party; All Progressives Congress
- Education: University of Ibadan

Kingsley Adeseye Ogunlewe is a Nigerian politician who served as the Minister of Works from 2003 to 2006. He previously served as the senator representing the Lagos East senatorial district from 1999 to 2003. He is from a royal family in Igbogbo.

== Early life ==
Ogunlewe is from an affluent dynasty of Igbogbo, a community in Ikorodu. His elder brother Akin was a permanent secretary in the Federal Ministry of Commerce and Industry, who was relieved of his position soon after Ogunlewe transferred to the PDP.

Ogunlewe is an alumnus of the University of Ibadan. During his stay in the premier University he lived in Mellanby Hall and participated actively in student

politics. He is a lawyer, and at one time was permanent secretary of Lagos State.

His son Moyosore is a politician. Another son, Seye, is a sprinter.

== Senator ==
He was elected Senator on the Alliance for Democracy (AD) platform in 1999 for the Lagos East constituency, before he defected to the PDP.

In July 2002, Wahab Dosunmu and Ogunlewe accused then-Lagos State Governor Bola Ahmed Tinubu of abusing trust of public funds through contract awards to his friends.

Ogunlewe ran for reelection in 2003 on the PDP ticket, but was defeated by Olorunnimbe Mamora of the Alliance for Democracy (AD).

== Minister of works ==
In July 2003, Ogunlewe announced that the federal government would invest about $2.85 billion in rehabilitating and upgrading the nation's highway network, and planned to make all roads in the country accessible by year end. In January 2004, he said the Federal government had approved an extra N900 million for rehabilitation of roads in the South-East.

In April 2004, Ogunlewe won the Kwame Nkrumah Africa Leadership Award in Accra, Ghana. In May 2004, he published his mobile phone number and told people to use it if they saw any pot-holes or had a traffic accident. He said he was inundated with calls, but also said of the roads "They are fantastic now." He claimed that 12,600 km of roads had been rehabilitated in the past six months.

In June 2004, there were clashes in Lagos state between agents of the Federal Ministry of Works and officials of the Lagos State Traffic Management Authority. The clashes were over control of Federal roads, and were apparently linked to ongoing disputes between Ogunlewe and the state governor Bola Ahmed Tinubu of the Alliance for Democracy.

In August 2004, Ogunlewe announced that The World Bank and the African Development Bank planned to cooperate with Nigeria to build the Trans-West African Highway from Lagos to Mauritania's capital Nouakchott. In October 2004, he stated that the year 2005 would see faster rapid progress in road repair and construction.

In March 2006, after being dismissed from his job as Works Minister, Ogunlewe urged President Olusegun Obasanjo to seek a third term in office.

== Later career ==
In July 2006, a Lagos State governorship candidate, Funsho Williams was found murdered in his home. Ogunlewe, who had been a rival for the PDP nomination, was arrested in connection with the murder. He was later released, but in February 2007, he was re-arrested.

In November 2009, the Senate ad hoc committee on transport led by Heineken Lokpobiri, submitted a report to the upper house that revealed "alleged serial malpractices" in road contracting over a ten-year period, and recommended that former ministers of works Anthony Anenih, Ogunlewe, Obafemi Anibaba, Cornelius Adebayo and others be prosecuted for corruption. Senate discussion of the report was delayed. He resigned from his position as the Pro-Chancellor of the Federal University of Agriculture, Abeokuta in 2016. In 2019, he left the Peoples Democratic Party for the All Progressives Congress
