= Tolani Sule Akibu =

Nigerian politician and administrator

Hon. Tolani Sule Akibu

Commissioner for Tertiary Education
- Incumbent
- Assumed office 13 September 2023
- Governor: Babajide Sanwo-Olu

Personal details
- Born: Lagos State, Nigeria
- Party: All Progressives Congress (APC)
- Occupation: Politician, Administrator

Tolani Sule is a Nigerian politician and education administrator who currently serves as the Honourable Commissioner for Tertiary Education in Lagos State.

== Career ==
Akibu has previously served as the Education Secretary for Ojo Local Government, and was a member of the Governing Advisory Council of Lagos State University (LASU).

Akibu is a member of the All Progressives Congress (APC) in Lagos State and served as the Deputy Director-General of the APC Presidential and Governorship Campaign Council for Lagos West Senatorial District II. He was sworn in as the Commissioner for Tertiary Education, Lagos State by Governor Babajide Sanwo-Olu in September 2023.
