= Jigi Bola =

Eye care program in Lagos State, Nigeria

Jigi Bola is a free eye screening and surgical operation for Lagosians. It was introduced by former Governor of Lagos State Senator Ahmed Bola Tinubu in the year 2001.

== Concept ==
It's a blindness prevention, treatment and awareness program centered on the grass root. The program is operated under the ministry of Health in the state. The program was a statewide initiative that rotates among all the zones in the state.

== The New Jigi Bola ==
Eleven years after Jigi Bola was launched by the administration of Senator Ahmed Bola Tinubu, Senator Gbenga Bareehu Ashafa revived the spirit of the program by distributing eyeglasses to Lagosians.
