= Sola Giwa =

Nigerian politician

Shakirudeen "Sola" Giwa is a Nigerian politician and lawmaker in the 8th Lagos State House of Assembly Inaugurated on June 8, 2015.

== Early life ==
Giwa grew up in Lagos Island, local government area of Lagos State southwestern Nigeria. He attended Ireti Primary School, Ikoyi before proceeding to Kuramo College Maroko and Government College, Eric Moore, Surulere, Lagos. He later proceeded to the Lagos State University for a Bachelor of Science (B.sc Hons.) degree in Biochemistry and Master (MBA) Degrees respectively. He belongs to the Eko Youth Congress (EYC), the Eko Club, Ikoyi Club 1938 and Island Club.

== Political life ==
As a university student, he served in various capacities at the Parliaments, Committees and Executives. He was the President of the National Union of Lagos Island Students NULIS (1996–1997) National Social Secretary and, NULIS (1994–1995), Student Representative Council Student Union Government (1994–1995), Auditor of the National Association of Biochemistry Students LASU chapter NABSLASU:1994–1995). He now participates actively in the All Progressive Congress (APC) in Lagos State.

He has built a career in public office in the past seven years working closely with the Lagos State Governor in different capacities. He was appointed Special Assistant to the Governor on LASTMA in 2007 where he worked with the Special Adviser on Transportation to the Governor, Kayode Opeifa, in building strong capacity and human resource that ensured the performance of LASTMA as an effective Agency. In 2011, he became the Senior Special Assistant (SSA) to Governor Babatunde Fashola (SAN) on Transportation working with the Commissioner for Transportation and other stakeholders within the government in building a virile transport system in the State. He represented the good people of Lagos Island Constituency II in the Lagos State House of Assembly between 2015 and 2019. Hon. Giwa was appointed the Chairman House Committee on Wealth Creation and Employment where provided the required leadership to the committee which saw to the provision of the legal and legislative framework used in establishing the Lagos State Employment Trust Fund.

He was appointed Senior Special Assistant on Central Business District to the Governor of Lagos, Mr Babajide Olusola Sanwo-Olu in 2019. In February 2021, he was appointed a member of the Lagos State Special Taskforce to manage gridlock in Apapa.

Hon. Sola Giwa was appointed Special Adviser on Transportation to the Governor of Lagos in August, 2022.
