= Bolanle =

Yoruba given female name

Bọ́láńlé
- Gender: Female
- Language: Yoruba

Origin
- Origin: Nigeria
- Meaning: Meets wealth at home
- Region of origin: South West, Nigeria

Other names
- Variant form: Omobolanle (Ọmọ́bọ́láńlé)

Bolanle audio is a Yoruba given name common in Nigeria, which means meets wealth at home. Bolanle is a short form of Ọmọ́bọ́láńlé (Child meets wealth at home).

== Notable people with the name Bolanle ==
- Omobolanle Aminat Sarumi, Nigerian politician.
- Bolanle Ambode, Nigerian female politician.
- Bolanle Austen-Peters, Nigerian movie director
- Bolanle Awe, Nigerian professor
- Bolanle Ninalowo, Nigerian actor and film producer
- Bolanle Olukanni, Nigerian TV presenter
- Olusegun Bolanle Gbeleyi, Nigerian politician
