= Irewe =

- Town
- Location of Irewe in Nigeria
- Coordinates: 6°28′4.44″N 3°8′27.258″E
- Country: Nigeria
- State: Lagos State
- Established: 16th century
- Time zone: UTC+1 (WAT)
- Postal code: 102101

Irewe is a town in Ojo local government area of Lagos State dominantly populated by the Awori. It is situated on the Island of one of the creeks in Badagry and is surrounded in the West by Iwori and the East by Ikare. On 1 July 2015, it was reported that six children who were from their way to school died from a boat mishap which led the Lagos State Government to stress on the use of life jackets.

== Notable people ==
- Sarah Adebisi Sosan
