= 2019 Nigerian Senate elections in Lagos State =

The 2019 Nigerian Senate election in Lagos State held on February 23, 2019, to elect members of the Nigerian Senate to represent Lagos State. Solomon Olamilekan Adeola representing Lagos West, Oluremi Tinubu representing Lagos Central. The late Osinowo Sikiru Adebayo represented Lagos East but his death brought Tokunbo Abiru to replace him after a bye-election in 2020. All won on the platform of All Progressives Congress.

== Overview ==
Affiliation	Party		Total
Affiliation	APC	PDP	Total
Before Election	3	0	3
After Election	3	0	3

== Summary ==
District	Incumbent	Party	Elected Senator	Party
Lagos West	Solomon Olamilekan Adeola	APC	Solomon Olamilekan Adeola	APC
Lagos Central	Oluremi Tinubu	APC	Oluremi Tinubu	APC
Lagos East	Gbenga Bareehu Ashafa	APC	Osinowo Sikiru Adebayo	APC

== Results ==
=== Lagos West ===
A total of 23 candidates registered with the Independent National Electoral Commission to contest in the election. APC candidate Solomon Olamilekan Adeola won the election, defeating PDP candidate Gbadebo Rhodes-Vivour and 8 other party candidates. Adeola received 41.38% of the votes, while Rhodes-Vivour received 39.40%.

2019 Nigerian Senate election in Lagos State
Party	Candidate	Votes	%
APC	Solomon Olamilekan Adeola	323,817	53.27%
PDP	Gbadebo Rhodes-Vivour	243,516	40.06%
Others		40,554	6.67%
Total votes		607,887	100%
APC hold			

=== Lagos Central ===
A total of 14 candidates registered with the Independent National Electoral Commission to contest in the election. APC candidate Oluremi Tinubu won the election, defeating PDP candidate Onitiri David and 12 other party candidates. Tinubu received 58.03% of the votes, while Onitiri received 39.25%.

2019 Nigerian Senate election in Lagos State
Party	Candidate	Votes	%
APC	Oluremi Tinubu	131,725	58.03%
PDP	Onitiri David	89,107	39.25%
Others		6,165	2.72%
Total votes		226,997	100%
APC hold			

=== Lagos East ===
A total of 17 candidates registered with the Independent National Electoral Commission to contest in the election. APC candidate Osinowo Sikiru Adebayo won the election, defeating PDP candidate Oyefusi Abiodun Adetola and 15 other party candidates. Osinowo received 59.21% of the votes, while Oyefusi received 36.69%.

2019 Nigerian Senate election in Lagos State
Party	Candidate	Votes	%
APC	Osinowo Sikiru Adebayo	145,839	59.21%
PDP	Oyefusi Abiodun Adetola	90,354	36.69%
Others		10,096	4.10%
Total votes		246,289	100%
APC hold			

== 2020 Bye election ==
A bye election was held on 5 December 2020 in the Lagos East Senatorial District due to a vacancy following the demise of Bayo Osinowo. Tokunbo Abiru of APC contested against Babatunde Gbadamosi of PDP. They totalled 89,204 and 11,257 votes respectively. Abiru was declared the winner by INEC.
