= Wale Tinubu =

Nigerian lawyer and businessman (born 1967)

Wale Tinubu CON
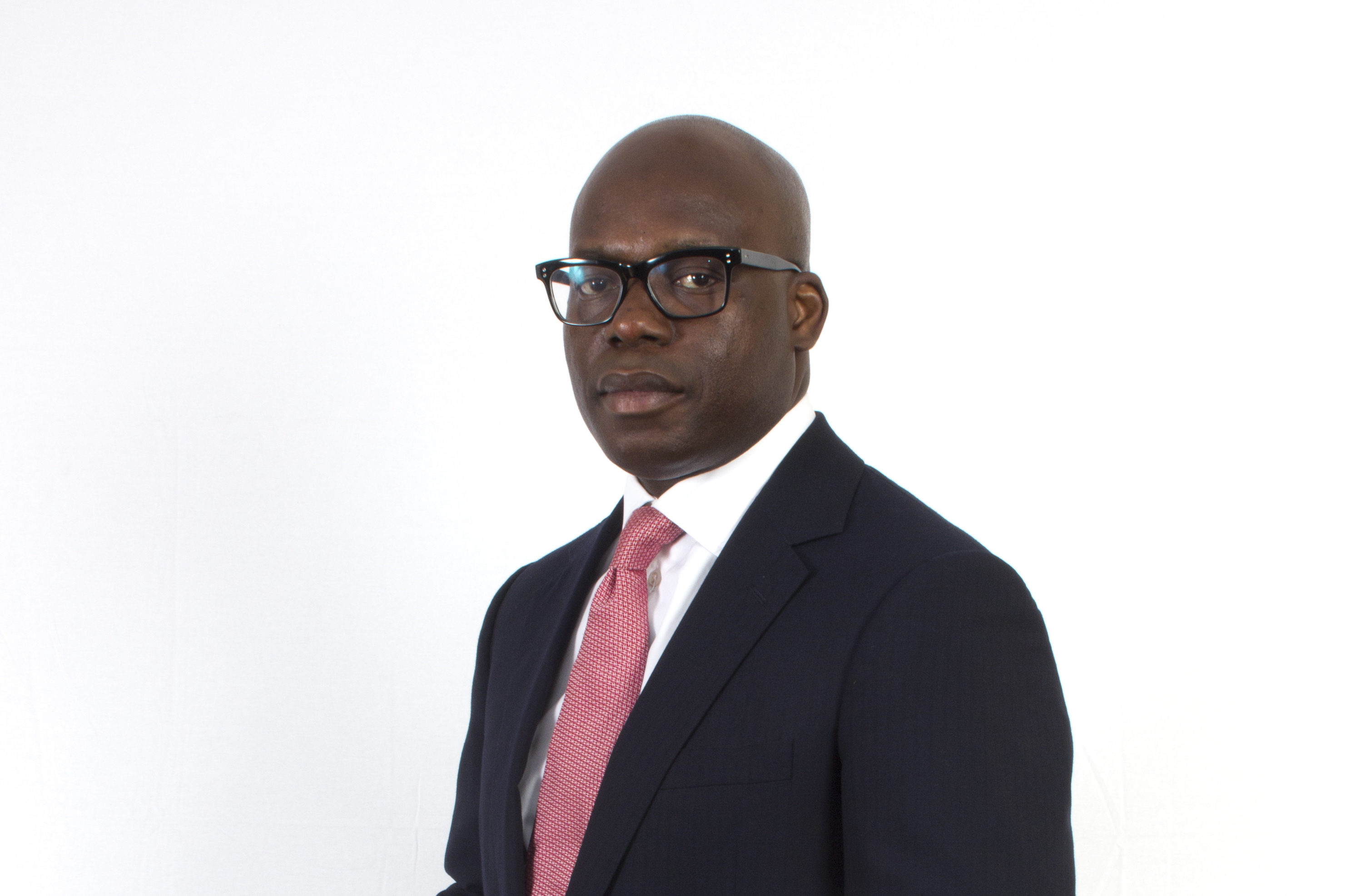
- Born: Jubril Adewale Tinubu; 26 June 1967 (age 59); Lagos State, Nigeria
- Citizenship: Nigeria
- Education: Federal Government College, Odogbolu; University of Liverpool; London School of Economics; Nigerian Law School
- Occupations: Lawyer; businessman
- Years active: 1990–present
- Relatives: Bola Tinubu (uncle); Oluremi Tinubu (aunt); Abibatu Mogaji (paternal grandmother)

Jubril Adewale "Wale" Tinubu CON (born 26 June 1967) is a Nigerian businessman and lawyer, who is the group chief executive officer of Oando PLC.

He began his career in 1990 as an attorney, specialising in corporate and petroleum law assignments. In 1994, he co-founded Ocean & Oil Group and guided its strategic development from an oil trading and shipping company.

== Education ==
Tinubu had his primary education in Lagos state and later obtained the West African School Certificate in 1983 from the Federal Government College, Odogbolu. He studied law at the University of Liverpool and obtained a Master of Laws degree from the London School of Economics. He returned to Nigeria at 22 to attend the Nigerian Law School in order to qualify to practice and was called to the Nigerian bar in 1990.

== Career ==
Tinubu began his career with his family law firm, K. O. Tinubu and Co, where he specialised in corporate and petroleum law. In 1994, he co-founded Ocean and Oil Limited, an oil company located in Nigeria.

== Awards and nominations ==
- "Private Sector Icon of the Year" award by Vanguard (2023)
- Conferred with the honour of Commander of the Order of the Niger (CON) in 2022 by the Federal Government of Nigeria under the administration of President Muhammadu Buhari.
- "The King of African Oil" by Forbes magazine
- One of the Top Ten CEOs in the world by ASKMEN
- Young global leader by the World Economic Forum (January 2007)
- "African Business Leader of the Year" by Africa Investor (2011)
- "Leadership" Business Person of the Year 2014
- "Africa Executive of the Year" by Oil Council (2015)
- "Entrepreneur of the Year" West Africa by Ernst & Young (2015)

== Personal life ==
Adewale Tinubu is the nephew of Bola Tinubu, President of the Federal Republic of Nigeria, GCFR.

He is married and has children.
