= First Lady of Lagos State =

Nigerian government official

- Incumbent; Ibijoke Sanwo-Olu since 29 May 2019
- Style: Her Excellency
- Residence: Ikeja

The first lady of Lagos State is the advisor to the Lagos State governor, and often plays a role in social activism. The position is traditionally held by the wife of the Lagos State governor, concurrent with his term of office, although the Constitution of Nigeria does not recognize the office of the first lady.

The current first lady is Ibijoke Sanwo-Olu.

== List of First Ladies ==
Funmilayo Johnson wife of Mobolaji Johnson Taiwo Adefunmilayo Lawal, wife of Adekunle Lawal (July 1975 – 1977)

Christine Nwanyife Kanu ex-wife of late Ndubuisi Godwin Kanu, Foluke Mudasiru wife of Gbolahan Mudasiru; Josephine Akhigbe wife of Mike Akhigbe; Fatima Raji Rasaki wife of Raji Rasaki; Lady Doja, widow of Michael Otedola; Omolola Oyinlola, wife of Olagunsoye Oyinlola; Munirat Marwa, wife of Mohammed Buba Marwa; Oluremi Tinubu, wife of Bola Tinubu; Abimbola Fashola, wife of Babatunde Raji Fashola; and Bolanle Ambode, wife of Akinwunmi Ambode
