= Obafemi Anibaba =

Nigerian civil servant and businessman

Federal Minister of Works
- In office March 2006 – September 2006
- Preceded by: Adeseye Ogunlewe
- Succeeded by: Cornelius Adebayo

Federal Minister of Communications
- In office September 2006 – January 2007
- Preceded by: Cornelius Adebayo
- Succeeded by: Frank Nweke

Obafemi Anibaba is a Nigerian civil servant and businessman who was appointed Federal Minister of Works in March 2006 and was redeployed as Minister of Communications in September 2006 during the presidency of Olusegun Obasanjo.

== Background ==
Obafemi Anibaba obtained a bachelor's degree in Mechanical Engineering from the University of Lagos and went on to obtain a PhD in Engineering from the University of Surrey. He worked for many years for the Lagos State Ministry of Works and Transport. He has served on the board of several companies, and was Chairman, Ogun-Osun River Basin Development Authority and Chairman, Femo Engineering (Nigeria). He was on the board of First Bank of Nigeria, Jos Steel Rolling Company and Allied Bank of Nigeria, and was Chairman of the Governing Council of Lagos Polytechnic, Isolo.

== Cabinet positions ==
The Federal Government of Nigeria appointed him Minister of Works in March 2006. He was transferred to become Minister of Communications in September 2006. He chaired the Nigeria Telecommunications Forum in Abuja on the 19–20 September 2006. He opened the Universal Service Provision Fund (USPF) Consultative Forum on Strategies for Achieving Access in Nigeria in Lagos on 31 October 2006. In his opening remarks he noted that USPF is only a fund to facilitate roll out of services in identified rural areas. The services would be implemented through qualified operating companies. On 22 November 2006, he attended a ceremony where President Olusegun Obasanjo cut the ribbon to formally open the new Corporate Headquarters of the Nigerian Communications Commission in Abuja.

In January 2007, Olusegun Obasanjo announced the final cabinet reshuffle of his administration. Among other moves, Frank Nweke, Jr, was appointed Federal Minister of Communications, while Anibaba stayed on as Minister of State in the Ministry, a position he held until the new administration of President Umaru Yar'Adua came into office in May 2007.

== Later career ==
In November 2009, the Senate ad hoc committee on transport led by Heineken Lokpobiri, submitted a report to the upper house that revealed "alleged serial malpractices" in road contracting over a ten-year period, and recommended that former ministers of works Anthony Anenih, Adeseye Ogunlewe, Obafemi Anibaba, Cornelius Adebayo and others be prosecuted for corruption. The Senate Ad Hoc Committee charges included awarding contracts without budgetary provision, and for failure to account for profits from a large sale of bitumen. Senate discussion of the report was delayed.
