= Sarah Adebisi Sosan =

Nigerian politician (born 1956)

Omoba Sarah Adebisi Sosan

Deputy Governor of Lagos State
- In office 29 May 2007 – 29 May 2011
- Governor: Babatunde Fashola
- Preceded by: Abiodun Ogunleye
- Succeeded by: Adejoke Orelope-Adefulire

Personal details
- Born: 11 February 1956 (age 70) Ojo, Badagry, British Nigeria (now Ojo, Lagos State, Nigeria)
- Party: All Progressives Congress (2013–present)
- Other political affiliations: Action Congress of Nigeria (before 2013)
- Education: University of Lagos

Sarah Adebisi Sosan (born 11 February 1956) is a Nigerian politician and former teacher, she served as deputy governor of Lagos State from 2007 to 2011.

== Early life and education ==
Sarah Adebisi was born in Lagos 11 February 1956 to the aristocratic family of Chief and Princess Durosinmi of Irewe town in Ojo Local Government Area, Badagry division. Her mother hails from the Fafunwa Onikoyi Royal Family of Ita-Onikoyi in Idumota, Lagos Island, and her father was a member of the defunct Action Group (AG) and Unity Party of Nigeria (UPN), thus making him a long-time disciple of Obafemi Awolowo. Due to her maternal ancestry, the former Deputy Governor bears the Yoruba traditional title Omoba.

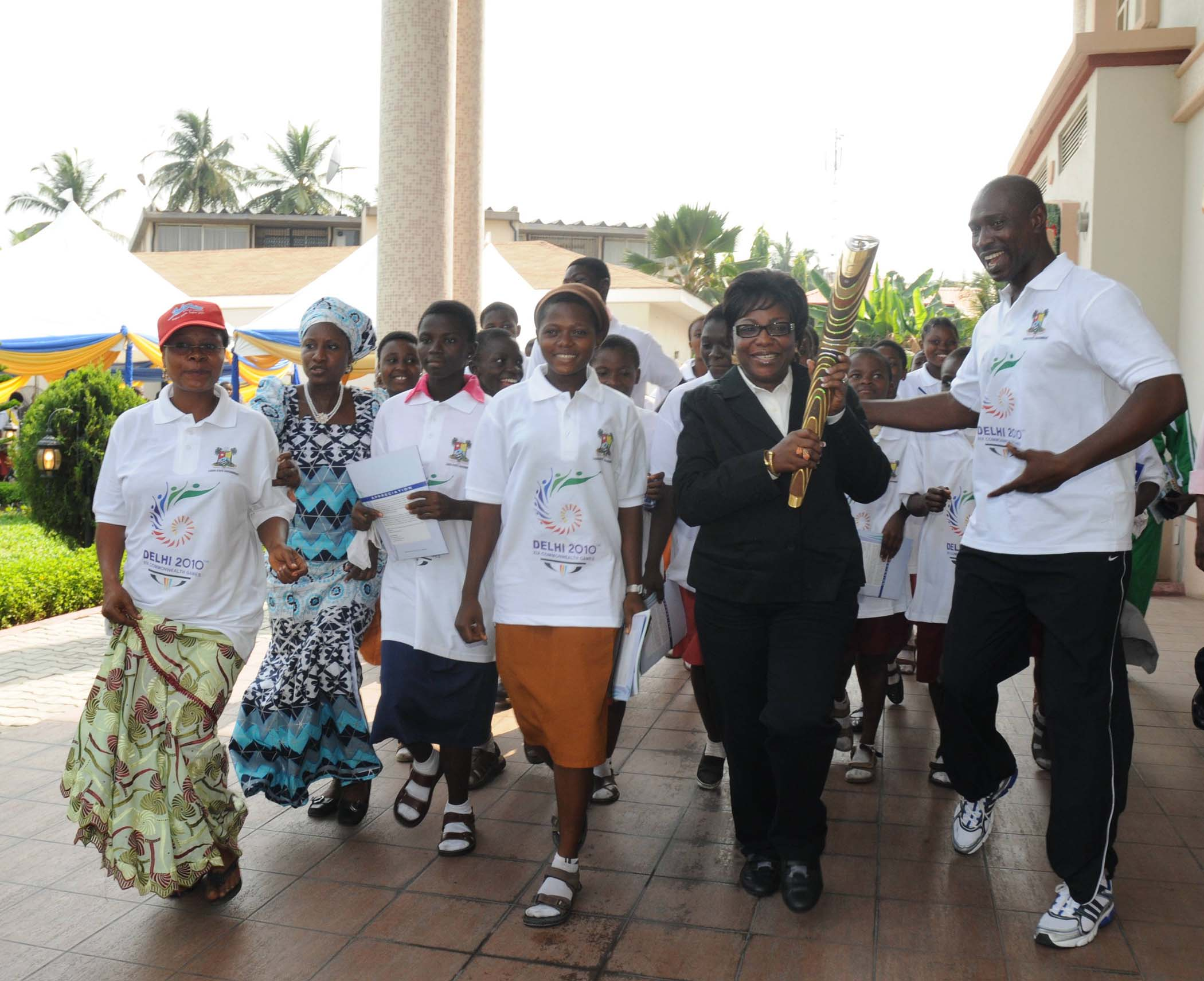
Former Deputy Governor, Lagos State, Princess Sarah Adebisi Sosan runs with the Queen's Baton in 2010.

She began her early education at the Christ Assembly Primary School, Apapa and Secondary Education at the Awori-Ajeromi Secondary School. She commenced her sojourn in the teaching profession at the then Lagos State College of Education, Ijanikin (now Adeniran Ogunsanya College of Education) in 1980 where she obtained the National Certificate of Education (NCE) and later proceeded to the University of Lagos, Akoka, where she obtained her Bachelor of Arts in English Education (B.A.) Ed in 1988 and a master's degree in Adult Education (M.Ed.) 1989.

Her determination to keep abreast with technology led her in 2004, to proceed for an Advanced Diploma in Information Technology at the Lagos City Computer College. She also serves as the commissioner of education in Lagos.

== Career ==
As a Youth Corper, Bisi taught at the St. Leo's Secondary School Abeokuta, Ogun State as a classroom teacher while her sojourn in the Lagos State Public Service started in January 1989 when she was employed by the then Lagos State Post Primary Teaching Service Commission (PP-TESCOM) as a Master Grade II, a classroom teaching appointment.

Between 1990 and 1999, Mrs. Sosan left her job as a teacher to serve as a Principal Education Officer at the Lagos State Ministry of Education. She later moved to the defunct State Primary Education Board (SPEB) now Lagos State Universal Basic Education Board (LSUBEB) as an Assistant Board Secretary. Later in year 2006 when the state Primary Education Board transformed to Lagos State Universal Basic Education Board, she was redeployed to the Department of Communication and Information Technology as the Head of Department (HOD). As the Head of Department, she was saddled with the responsibility of ensuring computer education and training was given the attention it deserved in Lagos State Public Primary Schools.

She was appointed to the position of Deputy Governor by Babatunde Fashola in 2007.

== Personal life ==
She is married with children.
