= Segun "Aeroland" Adewale =

Nigerian politician

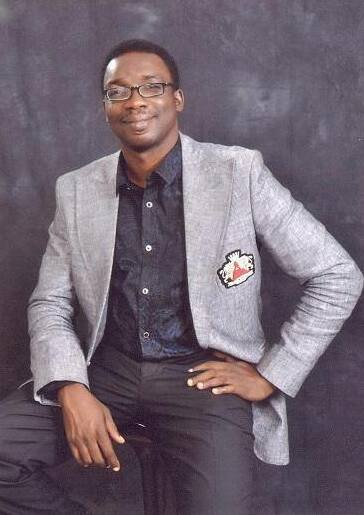

Personal details
- Born: Otunba Segun Adewale; 15 May 1966 (age 60) Lagos, Nigeria
- Party: Peoples Democratic Party (PDP)
- Spouse: Victoria Taiwo (Nee Owoeye)
- Education: University of Ibadan; Lagos State University
- Occupation: Entrepreneur, politician
- Website: Official website
- Nickname: Aeroland

Otunba Segun Adewale, popularly known as Segun Aeroland, (born May 15, 1966), is a Nigerian entrepreneur, philanthropist and grassroot politician. A native of Ipoti EKiti in Ijero Local Government Area of EKiti state, South Western Nigeria and the Lagos West Senatorial Candidate of the Peoples Democratic Party (PDP) in the 2015 senatorial election.

== Early life ==
Segun Adewale was born into the family of Mr. & Mrs. Michael Adewale of Ile Aremo & Ile Ogegenijo quarters on May 15, 1966.

Segun Adewale had his Primary Education at the Seventh Day Adventist School, Abule Oja, Lagos between 1972 and 1978. In 1979, his parents decided that their first child must return to Ekiti so he could be groomed and well-grounded in the Ekiti norms, values and traditions; thus he was admitted into Ipoti High School the same year. At the school, he was the youngest player in the football team. His philanthropic zeal also came to fore at that young age as he assisted indigent families in Ipoti. Even though he did not conclude his secondary education in Ekiti, he grew up substantially to understand the morals and traditional values which an average Ekiti man is noted for. He eventually concluded his Secondary School education at the Oriwu College, Ikorodu, Lagos state 1983, where he also won laurels for the college.

Segun Adewale attended the University of Ibadan between 1986 and 1990, where he bagged a Bachelor of Science degree in geography. He obtained his master's degree in public administration at the Lagos State University in 1995. He equally obtained a Certificate in Airline Management and Operations in 2012 and got a requisite Certificate in Flight Operations from the Institute of Flight Operations and Dispatcher (IFOD), Texas, USA in 2013.

== Professional background ==
In 1997, Segun Adewale founded his own company, Aeroland Travel Limited, a business travel management, Air charter and Aviation training company. The company has won over 20 awards, including the Delta Air Lines Award for Excellence in 2013, the Lufthansa Top Performer 2012, British Airways No. 1 Retail Agency in Nigeria. He is currently the Chairman of Aeroland Group, the Managing Director/CEO of Skyrace Nigeria Limited, the chairman, Board Of Trustees Segun Adewale Foundation for Community Development. He was the sole representative from Nigeria in the Virgin Atlantic/GTMC Training Institute. He is the National Vice Chairman, National Association of Travel Agent of Nigeria (NANTA). Aside the business angle, Segun is a Deacon at Word of Faith Ministry (a.k.a. Winners Chapel). He also holds the title of Otunba Bobajiro of Egbeda Land, from Alimosho, Lagos.

== Political career ==
Segun Adewale started politics as far back as 1988, when he contested and won the Student Union Government of University of Ibadan elections and served as Sports Secretary. In 2007, Segun Adewale ran for the Lagos State House Of Assembly on the Labour Party ticket, but his name was removed from the ballot paper just before the election. He defected from the Labour party to the Alliance for Democracy (AD) for some months before defecting to the Peoples Democratic Party (PDP) in 2011 and ran for the Federal House of Representative, Alimosho Federal Constituency, but lost the election to Solomon Adeola of the Action Congress OF Nigeria. The election was marred by violence. As a philanthropist, he has contributed to over 40 community projects amongst which are the construction of Mini-Bridge in Meiran, Isei-Oshun in 2011 and he has sponsored over 20 students on full scholarship to different tertiary institutions.

== Awards and achievements ==
Meritorious Award, Department of Geography, University of Ibadan, 1989 Sports Awards, Nnamdi Azikiwe Hall, University of Ibadan, 1988 Sportsmanship Award, Chanchaga L.G.A Minna, Niger State Virgin Atlantic Platinum Member British Airways Platinum member Alimosho sportsman of the year
