= Ibijoke Sanwo-Olu =

Lagos State First Lady

First Lady of Lagos State
- Incumbent
- Assumed role 29 May 2019
- Governor: Babajide Sanwo-Olu
- Preceded by: Bolanle Ambode

Personal details
- Born: Claudiana Ibijoke Carrena; 8 January 1967 (age 59)
- Spouse: Babajide Sanwo-Olu
- Occupation: administrator; medical practitioner

Claudiana Ibijoke Sanwo-Olu (née Carrena; born 8 January 1967) is a Nigerian medical doctor and administrator who has been the first lady of Lagos State, Nigeria, since 2019, as the spouse of the Governor Babajide Sanwo-Olu.

== Early life ==
Sanwo-Olu was born in 1967 in the Lagos Island neighbourhood of Popo Aguda, the daughter of Paulinus Olusegun Carrena. Like most residents of the historic neighbourhood, the Carrena family descended from Yoruba slaves repatriated from Brazil.

== Career ==
Sanwo-Olu graduated from the University of Lagos, Akoka, Yaba campus, with an MBBS and went on to earn a post-graduate diploma in Hospital and Health Management (PGDHM) as well as a Diploma in Anaesthesia (DA). She also has a master's degree in public health (MPH) and a master's degree in business administration (MBA).

Sanwo-Olu worked for the Lagos State Government for 25 years, rising through the ranks to become the Chief Medical Director and Chief Executive Officer at Harvey Road Comprehensive Health Centre in Yaba before being transferred to the General Hospital in Somolu.

She is also a women and children advocate.

== Personal life ==
She is married to Babajide Olusola Sanwo-Olu and they have four children. In 2023, her husband described her as a jewel of inestimable value for being his supportive partner and prayer warrior as they paddle the water of governance in the state.

== Achievements ==
Sanwo-Olu supported approximately 350 residents from all 57 local government areas and local council development areas through vocational training and financial grants.

== See also ==
- Abimbola Fashola
- Bolanle Ambode
- List of first ladies of Nigerian states

Honorary titles
Preceded by Bolanle Ambode	First Lady of Lagos State; 2019-till date	Succeeded by Incumbent
