= Kayode Opeifa =

Nigerian transportation expert

Managing Director of the Nigeria Railway Corporation
- Incumbent
- Assumed office 22 January 2025
- President: Bola Tinubu
- Preceded by: Engr. Fidet Okhiria

Personal details
- Born: 21 May 1965 (age 61)
- Education: University of Ilorin
- Occupation: Transport expert, Politician

Isiak Kayode Opeifa (born 21 May 1965) is a Nigerian transport administrator and former university lecturer who serves as the Managing Director of the Nigeria Railway Corporation (NRC), following his appointment by President Bola Tinubu on 22 January 2025. He previously served as Lagos State Commissioner for Transportation under the administration of Babatunde Fashola.

== Education ==
Opeifa attended the University of Ilorin (UNILORIN), Kwara State, where he obtained a BSc in Biochemistry from 1982 to 1986. He later completed his postgraduate studies, earning a master's degree and a PhD. He joined the academic staff of Lagos State University (LASU), Ojo, where he rose to become a member of the institution's Senate at the age of 29.

== Career ==
As an undergraduate, Opeifa was an active member of two student associations: the National Union of Lagos State Students (NULASS) and the National Association of Biochemistry Students (UNILORIN chapter), where he was elected president. In addition to his academic pursuits, he was a handball player during his undergraduate years and represented UNILORIN at the Nigerian University Games Association (NUGA) and Lagos State. In 2018, he began sponsoring the Lagos State Secondary Schools Handball Competition.

Opeifa's involvement in national politics began in 2007 when he contested in the primaries of his party for a seat in the House of Representatives but did not secure the party's ticket.

In 2019, he was appointed Vice Chairman and Team Leader of the Presidential Committee on Clearing of Apapa Port and Access Roads during President Muhammadu Buhari's administration. The committee was tasked with restoring law and order in the highly congested port area of Lagos and ensuring effective traffic management in the state.

Earlier, in 2007, the administration of Governor Fashola (2007–2015) appointed him Special Adviser on Transportation, where he played a pivotal role in reforming the Lagos State Traffic Management Authority (LASTMA). On 4 July 2011, Opeifa was sworn in as a member of Fashola's cabinet and was assigned the transportation portfolio.

In September 2017, he was appointed Transport Secretary for the Federal Capital Territory (FCT) by FCT Minister Mohammed Musa Bello. In February 2023, Buhari appointed him Managing Director of the Abuja Urban Mass Transit Company Ltd. (AUMTCO).

He was one of the aspirants for the Lagos West Senatorial District primary election, held on May 27, 2022, where he contested against former Deputy Governor of Lagos, Oluranti Adebule, and former Senator, Musiliu Obanikoro. Adebule emerged as the winner with 424 votes, Obanikoro received 119 votes, while Opeifa came third with 14 votes out of 557.

When the tenure of the former Managing Director of the Nigerian Railway Corporation (NRC), Fidet Okhiria, ended on 18 October 2024, Opeifa was reportedly considered to succeed him. However, Tinubu appointed Ben Iloanusi in an acting capacity. On 22 January 2025, Opeifa succeeded Iloanusi as NRC Managing Director following his appointment.

== Personal life ==
Kayode Opeifa is married, with a son and two daughters.
