= Lagos East senatorial district =

Senatorial district in Lagos State, Nigeria

The Lagos East senatorial district in Lagos State, Nigeria covers the local government areas of Epe, Ibeju-Lekki, Ikorodu, Kosofe, and Somolu. The senator currently representing the district is Tokunbo Abiru of the All Progressives Congress who was elected with 87.2% of the vote in 2020.

== List of senators ==
Senator	Party	Year	Assembly	Ref
Anthony Adefuye	SDP	5 December 1992 – 17 November 1993	3rd	
Adeseye Ogunlewe	AD	3 June 1999 – 3 June 2003	4th	
Adeleke Mamora	ACN	3 June 2003 – 6 June 2011	5th, 6th	
Gbenga Ashafa	APC	6 June 2011 – 9 June 2019	7th, 8th	
Adebayo Osinowo	APC	11 June 2019 – 15 June 2020	9th	
Tokunbo Abiru	APC	December 2020 – present	9th, 10th	
