= Adebayo Osinowo =

Nigerian politician and businessman (1955–2020)

Senator Adebayo Osinowo

Senator for Lagos East
- In office 11 June 2019 – 15 June 2020
- Preceded by: Gbenga Ashafa
- Succeeded by: Tokunbo Abiru

Member of the Lagos State House of Assembly for Kosofe Constituency
- In office May 2003 – May 2019

Personal details
- Born: 28 November 1955 Ijebu Ode, Western Region, British Nigeria (now in Ogun State, Nigeria)
- Died: 15 June 2020 (aged 64) Lagos State, Nigeria
- Party: All Progressives Congress
- Education: St. Augustin Primary School; Isonyin Grammar School
- Occupation: Politician; businessman

Adebayo Sikiru Osinowo (28 November 1955 – 15 June 2020) popularly known as Pepper was a Nigerian businessman and politician. Osinowo was a member of the Lagos State House of Assembly. Until his death, he was Senator representing Lagos East at the 9th Nigerian National Assembly.

== Early life ==
Osinowo had his primary education at St. Augustin Primary School in Ijebu-Ode and his secondary education in Isonyin Grammar School, Isonyin. His father was the Late Alhaji Rabiu Osinowo from Odo-Egbo in Ijebu Ode and his mother is Mariamo Taiwo Osinowo.

== Business and career ==
Osinowo worked with the Federal Ministry of Works, Lagos State. In 1977, he started his career as a Land Officer at the Federal Ministry of Works until 1979. He then became the managing director at NITAL International from 1986 to 2003. He then became the managing director at NIMCO International Co. Ltd from 1990 to 2003. He also worked as managing director, at Extreme Piling and Construction Company Ltd and NIMCO Dredging Company from 1990 to 2003.

== Politics ==
Osinowo began his political career in the second republic serving as a youth Chairman of the Social Democratic Party (SDP). The state chairman was late Bashorun Moshood Kashimawo Abiola. Osinowo was a four times honorable member in the Lagos State house of assembly. Osinowo contested a seat in the Lagos State House of Assembly for Kosofe constituency and won. In the February 23, 2019 Lagos East Senatorial District election, he was elected Senator, representing the Lagos East Senatorial District at the Nigerian National Assembly. He was subsequently appointed as the chairman, Senate Committee on Industries.

== Death ==
Bayo Osinowo died on 15 June 2020. He was reported to have died of complications from COVID-19 during the COVID-19 pandemic in Nigeria. He was buried the same day at his Ijebu-Ode residence.
