= Oando =

Nigerian multinational energy company

Oando PLC
- Type: Public
- Traded as: NGX: OANDO; JSE: OAO
- Industry: Oil and Gas
- Founded: 1956; 70 years ago (ESSO)
- Headquarters: Lagos, Nigeria
- Area served: West Africa
- Key people: Adewale Tinubu (CEO)
- Products: Crude oil Natural gas NGL
- Revenue: ▲ ₦ 3.21 Trillion (2025-FY)
- Net income: ▲ ₦ 204.91 Billion (2025-FY)
- Number of employees: 1045
- Subsidiaries: Oando Energy Resources; Oando Trading
- Website: oandoplc.com

Oando Plc is a Nigerian multinational energy company, operating in the upstream, midstream and downstream sectors. Founded in 1956, the company is headquartered in Lagos.

The company has a production output of 43,000 barrels (6,800 cubic metres) per day of oil equivalent, enterprise value of N520 billion and market capitalisation value of N115.1 billion.

== History ==
Oando's earliest roots can be traced to the formation of Esso Africa in 1956. Esso Africa was a downstream marketing company, a subsidiary of the Exxon Corporation of USA. To increase availability of petroleum products in the hinterland, in 1976 the Nigerian government purchased a controlling stake in the company and rebranded the company as Unipetrol Nigeria. On 1 March 1991, Unipetrol became a Public Limited company. Later on in the same year, the Nigerian government sold 60% equity to the Nigerian public in an initial public offering. By February 1992, Unipetrol was listed on the Nigerian Stock Exchange.

In 1999, Unipetrol acquired a 40% stake in Gaslink Nigeria Limited, a gas utility company. The acquisition was motivated by a desire to utilize its exclusive gas sale and purchase agreement with the Nigerian gas company. In 2001, the company increased its stake to 51 per cent. So far, Gaslink has developed 250 km of gas pipeline infrastructure.

=== Ocean and Oil taking control ===
In 2000, Ocean and Oil, a private investment company led by Nigerian entrepreneurs Adewale Tinubu and Omamofe Boyo acquired a 30% controlling interest in Unipetrol Plc. In 2001, Ocean and Oil increased its stake in Unipetrol to 42% via an irredeemable convertible loan stock issue.

In 2002, Ocean and Oil led Unipetrol's bid for a 60% stake of Agip Nigeria Plc, a rival petroleum marketing firm, owned by Agip Petroli BV, an Italian-based oil company. The merged company was named Oando PLC in 2003, making the company the largest downstream petroleum marketing company in Nigeria.

=== Oil servicing and early upstream ===
In 2005, Oando Energy Services was incorporated as an integrated Oilfield Services company to achieve the group's objectives in the upstream services industry.

In 2007, Oando Energy services acquired two oil drilling rigs in Nigeria's Niger Delta. In 2008, the company emerged Nigeria's first indigenous oil company with interests in producing deep water assets through the acquisition of equity in two oil blocks. By 2009, the company had acquired 5 swamp rigs and in 2010, the company launched its first Independent Power Plant for the Lagos Water Corporation. The project involved the construction of a 12.5MW power plant to provide uninterrupted power supply to the Lagos Water Corporation.

=== Gas and power infrastructure ===
In 2011, Oando Gas and Power (now Axxela) commissioned 128 km EHGC Pipeline, the pipeline was built under a joint venture arrangement with the Nigerian Gas Company (NGC), a subsidiary of the Nigerian National Petroleum Corporation (NNPC). The gas infrastructure has the capacity to deliver up to 100 million cubic feet per day (2.8 million cubic metres per day) at standard pressure of natural gas and will deliver an initial 22 million cu ft/d (620 thousand m^{3}/d) of gas to its maiden customer, United Cement Company (UNICEM), to fuel its new 2.5million metric tonnes per annum cement plant, located in Mfamosing, Akampka Local Government Area of Cross River State.

=== Raising capital and growing oil servicing fleet ===
In 2012, Oando Exploration and Production Limited ("OEPL") signed a farm-in agreement with Network Exploration & Production Nigeria Limited ("NEPN") for the acquisition of 40% participating interest in the Qua Iboe field (OML 13) subject to the consent of the Minister of Petroleum.

In 2013, Oando Plc succeeded in raising over N55.2 billion from the capital markets as its Rights Issue recorded 101 per cent subscription. The company issued 4.548 billion shares to existing shareholders at N12 per share between December 2012 and February 2013 with the intention of raising N54.6 billion. Oando Gas and Power commissioned 10.4 MW Alausa Independent Power Plant to provide electricity to the Lagos State Secretariat Complex. Following the decommissioning of OES Professionalism in 2013, OES currently has a fleet of 4 rigs; OES Teamwork, OES Respect, OES Integrity and OES Passion.

=== Divestments, deals and TSX listing ===
In 2014, Oando divested the 128 km Eastern Horizon Gas Company (EHGC) franchise in a $250 Million transaction with Seven Energy.

In 2014, Oando Energy Resources ("OER") listed on the TSX an affiliate company of Oando PLC entered into agreements with ConocoPhillips ("COP") to acquire its entire business interests in Nigeria for a total cash consideration of ~ $1.5 Billion.

In June 2015, Oando entered into an agreement with HV Investments II B.V., ("HVI"), a joint venture owned by a fund advised by Helios Investment Partners ("Helios") and The Vitol Group ("Vitol"), for a cash investment of US$461 million in Oando's Downstream business.

In July 2016, Oando entered into a tri-partite agreement with the Vitol Group, an independent trader of energy commodities and Helios Investment Partner, an Africa-focused private investment firm to form OVH (formerly known as Oando Downstream).

In September 2016, Oando announced the execution of a definitive agreement with a vehicle owned by funds advised by Helios Investment Partners LLP ("Helios"), a premier Africa-focused private investment firm, to acquire 49% of the voting rights in Oando's midstream business subsidiary, Oando Gas and Power Limited.

=== SEC Allegations ===
In April 2018, the Securities and Exchange Commission (Nigeria) gave the directive for Oando PLC's shares to resume trading on the Nigerian Stock Exchange after placing the company's shares on suspension in October 2017 in order to execute a forensic audit.

On 31 May 2019, the Securities and Exchange Commission (Nigeria) issued a "Press Release on Investigation of Oando Plc" notifying the public of the conclusion of the commission's investigations of allegations against Oando. The Commission ordered the resignation of board members implicated and barred "...the Group Chief Executive Officer (GCEO) and the Deputy Group Chief Executive Officer (DGCEO) of Oando Plc from being directors of public companies for a period of five (5) years".

On Monday 3 June 2019 the Federal High Court of Lagos under presiding Judge C M A Olatoregun granted Oando PLC's group chief executive, Adewale Tinubu, and deputy group chief executive, Omamofe Boyo, an injunction restraining the Securities and Exchange Commission from executing sanctions, pending the hearing and determination of the applicant's motion for interlocutory injunction.

=== New discovery and gas supply deals with NLNG ===
On 4 September 2020 Oando announced that the NNPC/NAOC/OANDO Joint Venture made Significant Gas & Condensates Discovery Onshore Niger Delta find in the deeper sequences of the Obiafu-Obrikom fields, in OML61, onshore Niger Delta.

On 13 December 2020 Oando announced the successful signing of two gas supply agreements with Nigeria Liquefied Natural Gas Ltd (NLNG) for the renewal of gas supply for the existing Trains 1-3 for a term of 10 years and for gas supply for the impending Train 7 for a term of 20 years.

On 19 July 2021, Oando entered into a settlement with the Securities and Exchange Commission. The settlement reached by the parties was aimed at preventing further market disruption and harm to Oando PLC’s shareholders. As a result, Oando’s directors and management team have the opportunity to fully focus on business operations whilst continuing to ensure that it is in compliance with all governing statutes.

=== The NAOC acquisition ===
Oando announced completion of its acquisition of the Nigerian Agip Oil Company (NAOC) from Eni in 2024. It bought 100% of NAOC’s shares for $783 million, covering the asset consideration plus a reimbursement component. The company called the deal a milestone in its long-term strategy to expand upstream operations and strengthen its position in Nigerian oil and gas.

What Oando acquired

- OMLs 60, 61, 62 and 63 (onshore): An additional 20% interest in each block. NAOC had been operating these for a joint venture with NNPC.
- OPL 282 (exploration): A 90% operating stake.
- OPL 135 (exploration): A 48% operating stake.
- Discoveries: 40 oil and gas discoveries, 24 of them producing.
- Infrastructure: 1,490 km of pipelines, three gas processing plants, and the Brass River oil terminal.
- Power: Okpai 1 and Okpai 2, with a combined capacity of 960 MW.

Recognition

The acquisition won Deal of the Year at Africa Energy Week in 2024. In 2025 it won Energy Deal of the Year (NIES) and Domestic Impact Deal of the Year (IFLR Africa Awards).

Exploration and Production: 2026 Average Net Production was 42,789 barrels (6,800 m^{3}) per day of oil equivalent

Assets Portfolio: 14 Producing

Development & Exploration Assets:

- 928 million bbl (148 million m^{3}) of oil equivalent of 2P Reserves
- 173.6 million bbl (27.6 million m^{3}) of oil equivalent of 2C Resources

Trading: C 7% of Nigeria's Fuel Requirement is Supplied by Oando Trading

OVH Energy: > 320 Retail Outlets Operations in Nigeria, Ghana, Benin and Togo

== Operating divisions ==
Oando PLC is organized functionally into a number of operating divisions. These divisions are grouped into three categories:

- Upstream: Oando Energy Resources (OER, The leading indigenous exploration and production company in Nigeria)
- Downstream: Oando Vitol and Helios (OVH Energy), Oando Trading
