= Lagos West senatorial district =

Senatorial district in Lagos State, Nigeria

The Lagos West senatorial district in Lagos State, Nigeria covers the local government areas of Agege, Ajeromi-Ifelodun, Alimosho, Amuwo-Odofin, Badagry, Ifako-Ijaiye, Ikeja, Mushin, Ojo, and Oshodi-Isolo. The senator currently representing the district is Oluranti Adebule of the All Progressives Congress who was elected in 2023.

== List of senators ==
Senator	Party	Year	Assembly
Bola Tinubu	SDP	5 December 1992 – 17 November 1993	3rd
Wahab Dosunmu	AD	3 June 1999 – 3 June 2003	4th
Tokunbo Afikuyomi	AD	3 June 2003 – 5 June 2007	5th
Ganiyu Solomon	ACN	5 June 2007 – 6 June 2015	6th, 7th
Solomon Adeola	APC	9 June 2015 – 11 June 2023	8th, 9th
Oluranti Adebule	APC	13 June 2023 – present	10th
