= Olayemi Oyebanji =

First Lady of Ekiti State, Nigeria

First Lady of Ekiti State
- Incumbent
- Assumed role 16 October 2022
- Biodun Oyebanji

Personal details
- Born: Olayemi Olajumoke Abiodun Ado-Ekiti
- Citizenship: Nigerian
- Spouse: Biodun Oyebanji
- Occupation: Professor

Doctor Olayemi Olajumoke Abiodun Oyebanji is a Nigerian professor, educator and politician. She is the current First Lady of Ekiti State since 2023 as the wife of the governor, Biodun Oyebanji.

== Biography ==
She is from Ado-Ewi in Ado-Ekiti Local Government Area of Ekiti State.

She attended the University of Ibadan, where she met her husband and graduated with a degree in Education Management after which she returned to the University of Ibadan to teach as a lecturer. She further obtained a Ph.D in Educational Management.

On the 16th October 2022, she became the First Lady of Ekiti State when her husband was inaugurated as the governor of Ekiti State.

In 2024, She launched a project named Widows, Aged, Orphans and the Homeless (WAOH) in Ekiti State, and "Àdìre Èkìtì" to boost local production of the Adire fabric. She is also a women rights activist who has spoken on the importance of women's inclusivity, supports women's health for mothers and exclusive breastfeeding and early immunization for infants.

As First Lady, she has supported community development in Ekiti State through donations.

She is currently a senior lecturer at the University of Ibadan.

== Awards ==
- 2024 Nigerian Association for Educational and Administration Planning (NAEAP) Fellowship Award.
- 2026 Doctorate Fellow in Strategic Leadership and Public Resources Management.
