= Tamunominini Makinde =

Nigerian lawyer

Tamunominini Olufunke Makinde

First Lady of Oyo State
- Incumbent
- Assumed office May 2019 –
- Governor: Seyi Makinde
- Preceded by: Florence Ajimobi

Personal details
- Born: Tamunominini Olufunke; June 9, 1972 (age 54) Buguma, Rivers State, Nigeria
- Spouse: Seyi Makinde
- Occupation: Engineer

Tamunominini Olufunke Makinde (born 9 June 1972) is a petrochemical engineer, politician. She has been the First Lady of Oyo State since May 2019 as the wife of its current governor, Seyi Makinde.

== Biography ==
Tamuno Olufunke Ominini was born of Buguma in Asari Toru Local Government Area of Rivers State, Nigeria to a Kalabari family. Her father was an engineer.

She graduated from Rivers State University of Science and Technology, where she obtained a Bachelor of Engineering in Chemical Engineering. She further progressed to study at St. Thomas University in Houston, where she obtained a B.Sc. in Finance and an M.Sc. in Business Administration in 2017.

She is a practicing engineer and businesswoman and once managed the Makon Group of Companies, owned by her husband.

Tamunominini Makinde is a promoter of women's rights, and as First Lady has spoken out on the issue of women trafficking and gender-based violence. She has organized welfare programmes across Oyo State to support the vulnerable, targeting women and children. She has also criticized female genital mutilation (FGM).

Tamunominini is married Seyi Makinde who she first met when she was 19. They have three children.

She is currently the vice chairperson of the Nigeria Governor's Spouses Forum (NGSF) and the founder of Omituntun For Life Foundation, an organization that assists people living with disabilities.
