= Tokunbo Abiru =

Nigerian politician and banker (born 1964)

Senator Tokunbo Abiru

Senator for Lagos East
- Incumbent
- Assumed office December 2020
- Preceded by: Bayo Osinowo

Personal details
- Born: Mukhail Adetokunbo Abiru; 25 March 1964 (age 62) Lagos State, Nigeria
- Party: All Progressives Congress
- Spouse: Feyishola Abiru
- Education: Harvard Business School; Lagos Business School; Lagos State University
- Occupation: Banker
- Website: tokunboabiru.org

Mukhail Adetokunbo "Tokunbo" Abiru FCA (born 25 March 1964) is a Nigerian banker and politician. He is the senator representing the Lagos East Senatorial District at the 9th Nigerian National Assembly.

== Education ==
He attended the six-week Harvard Business School Advanced Management Program and Lagos Business School (Senior Management Program). He holds a BSc (economics) from Lagos State University and is a Fellow of the Institute of Chartered Accountants of Nigeria (ICAN) and an Honorary Senior Member of the Chartered Institute of Bankers of Nigeria (CIBN).

== Career ==
=== Banker ===
Abiru rose to the position of executive director at First Bank Nigeria Ltd (2013–16), and was also the Honourable Commissioner of Finance, Lagos State, between 2011 and 2013 under the dynamic and transformational leadership of Babatunde R. Fashola (SAN) as Governor. Prior to this position, he was the Group Managing Director/Chief Executive Officer of Polaris Bank Limited, Nigeria.

He was appointed in July 2016 by the Central Bank of Nigeria (CBN), as group managing director to lead the turnaround of the regulator-induced takeover of the then-troubled Skye Bank, in a bid to preserve the stability of the overall Nigerian Financial System. The successful completion of the assignment gave birth to today's Polaris Bank Limited.

Tokunbo has also served on various boards, including Airtel Mobile Networks Limited; FBN Capital Limited (now FBN Quest Merchant Bank Limited); FBN Bank Sierra –Leone Limited; and Nigeria Inter-Bank Settlement System Plc (NIBSS). During COVID-19 pandemic, he has donated 150,000 face masks to primary schools in his zone.

On 24 August 2020, Abiru resigned from Polaris Bank to contest the Lagos East senatorial election under the platform of the All Progressives Congress.

=== Public sector ===
During Abiru's time as commissioner for finance in Lagos State, the state floated an N80 billion bond, earning it the EMEA Finance's Best Local Currency Bond Award for 2012. He opened up discussions on taxation in Lagos State after the discovery of over 5.5 million tax evaders in 2013. His efforts also led to increased Land Use Charge revenue generations to the tune of N6.2bn.

Abiru is also a member of the Lagos HOMs Committee, which is in charge of the Lagos State Home Ownership Mortgage Scheme (HOMs) instituted to reduce the housing deficit in the state.

He was named the chairman, of the Senate Committee on Banking of the 10th senate on 8 August 2023.

Abiru was elected as the senator of Lagos East Senatorial district in a by-election on 5 December 2020.
