= Solomon Adeola =

Nigerian politician and accountant (born 1969)

Solomon Adeola CON
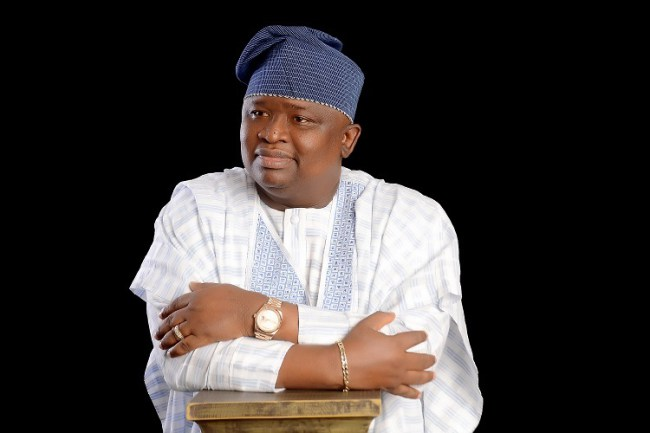

Senator for Ogun West
- Incumbent
- Assumed office 13 June 2023
- Preceded by: Tolu Odebiyi

Senator for Lagos West
- In office 9 June 2015 – 11 June 2023 Serving with Oluremi Tinubu and Tokunbo Abiru
- Preceded by: Ganiyu Solomon
- Succeeded by: Oluranti Adebule

Vice-Chairman of the Senate Committee on Communications
- In office 17 September 2015 – 9 June 2019
- Preceded by: Gilbert Nnaji

Member of the Nigerian House of Representatives
- In office 6 June 2011 – 6 June 2015
- Preceded by: Emmanuel Oyeyemi Adedeji
- Succeeded by: Oluwafemi Adebanjo

Personal details
- Born: Solomon Olamilekan Adeola; 10 August 1969 (age 57) Lagos, Nigeria
- Party: All Progressives Congress
- Spouse: Temitope Adeola
- Education: Rufus Giwa Polytechnic
- Occupation: Politician; accountant
- Website: yayiadeola.com.ng

Solomon Olamilekan Adeola CON also known by the alias Yayi (born 10 August 1969), is a Nigerian politician who has served as Senator for Ogun West since 2023. He previously served as the Senator from Lagos West from 2015 to 2023. From 2011 to 2015, he was the Chairman of the House of Representatives Committee on Public Accounts. He is also a chartered accountant and a member of the Association of Accounting Technicians (AAT).. He is the All Progressives Congress (APC) candidate for 2027 Ogun State for governorship election.

== Early life and education ==
Adeola was born on 10 August 1969, at Lagos Island Maternity Hospital to Ayinde Adeola Ogunleye and Abeeni Olasunbo Ogunleye (née Akinola). He grew up in Alimosho where he began his education at State Primary School in Alimosho, Lagos. He proceeded to Community Grammar School, Akowonjo, Lagos for his secondary education. He then moved on to the Ondo State Polytechnic, Owo now Rufus Giwa Polytechnic, Owo, Ondo state where he bagged a Higher National Diploma (HND) in Accounting.

Adeola is a Chartered Accountant and is a Chartered Accountant-Fellow at the Institute of Chartered Accountants of Nigeria (ICAN).

== Professional background ==
Adeola had a stint with the flagship of Nigerian newspapers, The Guardian Newspapers Limited for 12 years and rose to the position of Accountant.

Adeola proceeded to Olatunji Omoyeni & Co, a chartered accounting firm, where he led the audit team for several years and was later promoted to the position of a Senior Auditor. He later established his own company, SOOTEM Nigeria Limited, where he was the managing director and chief executive officer in the firm that specialized in tax consultancy.

== Political career ==
Following his decision to join active politics, sometime at the dawn of the 4th Republic, Adeola was nominated and won the primary of the then ruling Action Congress of Nigeria (Lagos State) and was elected as a member to represent Alimosho State Constituency 2, at the Lagos State House of Assembly from 2003 to 2007, and again from 2007 to 2011. Adeola was reputed to have been instrumental to the enactment of the law that strengthened the Lagos State Internal Revenue Service, a legislation that catapulted the revenue of the state from N5 billion monthly to over N20 billion. He was also part of the team that passed the Fiscal Responsibility Act and the Public Procurement Act of Lagos State.

Adeola was elected to the Federal Legislature to represent Alimosho Federal Constituency at the Nigerian House of Representatives in 2011.

And when the committees of the House were inaugurated by the Speaker, Rt. Hon. Aminu Tambuwal for members, he got position of the chairman of the only constitutional committee, the Public Accounts Committee of the House. He got the post as a first time member of the House. He is now a Senator and is the Vice Chairman of Senate Committee on Communications as well as member of the Finance, Marine, Interior and Science and Technology committees of the Senate. He was re-elected as senator representing Lagos west in the 2019 general elections.

In the 2023 General Election, He contested for the Senator for Ogun West Senatorial District and was elected as Senator representing Ogun West Senatorial District.

Adeola emerged as the APC candidate for Ogun 2027 governorship election after the Party Stakeholders led by Governor Dapo Abiodun adopted him as Consensus candidate. He was named the Chairman, Senate committee on appropriations of the 10th senate on 8 August 2023.

== Membership ==
Adeola is a member of Aids, Loans and Debt Management, Emergency & Disaster Preparedness, Land Transport and Petroleum Resources (Up Stream) Committees.

== Awards and honors ==
- On 11 October 2022, a Nigerian National Honour of Commander Of The Order Of The Niger (CON) was conferred on him by President Muhammadu Buhari.
- On 31 March 2022, Adeola was awarded the title of Fellow of the Federal Polytechnic, Ilaro.
- On 31 January 2026 awarded Sun Newspapers Man of the Year 2025.
