= Adejoke Orelope-Adefulire =

Nigerian politician (born 1959)

Deputy Governor of Lagos State
- In office 29 May 2011 – 29 May 2015
- Governor: Babatunde Fashola
- Preceded by: Sarah Adebisi Sosan
- Succeeded by: Oluranti Adebule

Personal details
- Born: Victoria Adejoke Orelope; 29 September 1959 (age 67) Lagos State, Nigeria
- Party: All Progressives Congress (2013–present)
- Other political affiliations: Action Congress of Nigeria (before 2013)
- Education: University of Lagos

Victoria Adejoke Adefulire (née Orelope) (born 29 September 1959) is a Nigerian politician. She served as deputy governor of Lagos State from 2011 to 2015. Prior to that, she was the Commissioner for Women Affairs and Poverty Alleviation of Lagos State from 2003 to 2011.

On 7 March 2016, Femi Adesina, the special adviser to the president, Media and Publicity announced President Muhammadu Buhari's appointment of Orelope-Adefulire as his senior special assistant on Sustainable Development Goals.

== Education ==
Senior Special Assist attended Salvation Army Primary School, Agege, Lagos (1965–1971), and finished her secondary school education from St Joseph's Secondary School, Mangoro, in Ikeja Local Government Area of Lagos State. She is an alumna of Lagos State University (LASU) and was awarded an honorary degree by the university. She has a bachelor's degree in sociology and a diploma in social works.

== Personal life ==
Orelope-Adefulire is a Christian. She was born into the royal lineage of Prince Kareem-Laka of Akeja Oniyanru and Amore Ruling House in Egbeda, Alimosho, Lagos State. She is the first daughter and the third born out 13 children.

Orelope-Adefuire is popularly called 'Iya Alanu', which means 'cheerful giver'.

She worked at the Front Office Executive at PZ Industries, Nigeria PLC.

== Achievements ==
Orelope-Adefulire received the Daisey George Award in 2010. She was recognised for her efforts in empowering and advocating rights of women and children.

== Controversies ==
In November 2023, the Foundation for Investigative Journalism (FIJ) published a report alleging that Orelope-Adefulire's office paid ₦147 million to a restaurant to build classrooms in Lagos, leading to corruption allegations and raising concerns about state financial transparency. Orelope-Adefulire was serving as the former president Buhari's senior special assistant on Sustainable Development Goals.

In May 2024, the reporter who performed the investigation, Daniel Ojukwu, was arrested for violating the Cybercrime Prohibition Act of 2015, an Act that Orelope-Adefulire was involved in passing during her time as Lagos State Deputy Governor in 2015. Ojukwu was released from police custody ten days later, following protests from media rights group.

Ojukwu was remanded again in November 2026, accused of 12 counts of defamation of Orelope-Adefulire, whose lawyers claimed that the report had put her 'in fear of death'. Ojukwu was also charged with violating the Cybercrimes Act, which carries a maximum sentence of 10 years imprisonment, or a fine of ₦25 million.

On the 14th of November, 2026, the Nigerian Guild of Editors (NGE) condemed the continued detention of Daniel Ojukwu, which was seen as a way to suppress Daniel's investigations into alledged corrupt practices by Orelope-Adefulire.

== Career ==
Orelope-Adefulire is an administrator, social worker, politician and princess from a royal family. At the start of her career in politics, she was elected into the Lagos State House of Assembly to represent Alimosho Constituency I. She was subsequently elected as the chairman, House Service Committee. In 2002, she was appointed as the electoral commissioner at the Lagos State Independent Electoral Commissioner.

From 2003 to 2007, she was appointed Lagos state commissioner for Women Affairs, and was subsequently appointed to the same position between 2007 and 2011. In 2011, she was elected the deputy governor of Lagos State and occupied the position until the end of the administration of His Excellency, Babatunde Raji Fashola in 2015. President Muhammadu Buhari appointed Orelope-Adefulire as his senior special assistant on Sustainable Development Goals. She was reappointed by President Bola Ahmed Tinubu on 14 September 2023 to the same position.

As a grassroots politician, she is the All Progressive Congress Political Apex leader of the Alimosho Federal Constituency. She is also a prominent member of the Lagos State Governor's Advisory Council (GAC). The GAC is the highest profile of political decision making body of the Lagos State Government.
