= Abimbola Fashola =

Former First Lady of Lagos State

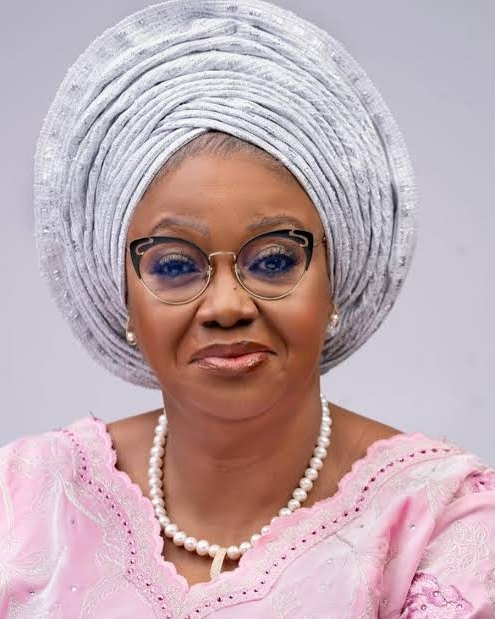

First Lady of Lagos State
- In office 29 May 2007 – 29 May 2015
- Governor: Babatunde Fashola
- Preceded by: Oluremi Tinubu
- Succeeded by: Bolanle Ambode

Personal details
- Born: 6 April 1965 (age 61) Ibadan, Western Region, Nigeria (now Oyo State)
- Spouse: Babatunde Fashola
- Occupation: Administrator

Abimbola Emmanuela Fashola (born 6 April 1965) is a Nigerian administrator and former First Lady of Lagos State. She served as First Lady from 2007 to 2015 during the administration of her husband, Babatunde Fashola.

== Early life and education ==
Abimbola Emmanuela Fashola was born on 6 April 1965 in Ibadan, present-day Oyo State, Nigeria.

She attended Lagoon Secretarial College, Lagos, where she obtained a diploma in Secretarial Studies before later obtaining a certificate in Computer Science from the University of Lagos.

== Career ==
Fashola began her career as a trainee journalist with Daily Sketch before joining the British Council in 1987. During her nineteen years with the organisation, she worked in several administrative and educational support roles before resigning in 2006 after her husband emerged as the governorship candidate of the Action Congress for the 2007 Lagos State gubernatorial election.

As First Lady of Lagos State, she chaired the Committee of Wives of Lagos State Officials (COWLSO) and supported programmes focusing on maternal and child health, youth development, education, HIV/AIDS awareness and women's empowerment.

After leaving office, she continued her work in youth leadership and community development through the Leadership Empowerment and Resource Network (LEARN), a non-governmental organisation established to promote leadership, entrepreneurship and civic responsibility among young Nigerians.

== Personal life ==
Fashola is married to former Lagos State Governor and former Minister of Works Babatunde Fashola. They have two children.

== See also ==
- Kofoworola Bucknor
- Adejoke Orelope-Adefulire

Honorary titles
Preceded by Oluremi Tinubu	First Lady of Lagos State; 2007-2015	Succeeded by Bolanle Ambode
