= Cornelius Adebayo =

Nigerian politician (1941–2025)

Cornelius Olatunji Adebayo

Governor, Kwara State, Nigeria
- In office 1983–1983
- Preceded by: Adamu Atta
- Succeeded by: Salaudeen Latinwo

Federal Minister of Communications, Nigeria
- In office July 2003 – August 2006
- Preceded by: Haliru Mohammed Bello
- Succeeded by: Obafemi Anibaba

Personal details
- Born: 24 February 1941 Oke-Onigbin, Colony and Protectorate of Nigeria
- Died: 25 June 2025 (aged 84) Abuja, Nigeria
- Profession: Teacher, politician

Cornelius Olatunji Adebayo (24 February 1941 – 25 June 2025) was a Nigerian politician, who served as a senator before becoming a state governor, and then later as head of the Nigerian Federal Ministry of Communications.

== Background ==
Cornelius Olatunji Adebayo was born on 24 February 1941, in Igbaja, now in Kwara State. He was educated at all Saints Anglican School, Oke-Onigbin, Provincial Secondary School, Ilorin and then at Barewa College, Zaria from 1962 to 1963. He studied at the Ahmadu Bello University, Zaria (1964–1967), and at the University of Ghana, Legon (1967–1969). He became a lecturer at the University of Ife in 1969, and in 1973 was appointed head of the English Department at Kwara State College of Technology. Between 1975 and 1978, he was Commissioner for Education and later Commissioner for Information and Economic Development in Kwara State.

== Early political career ==
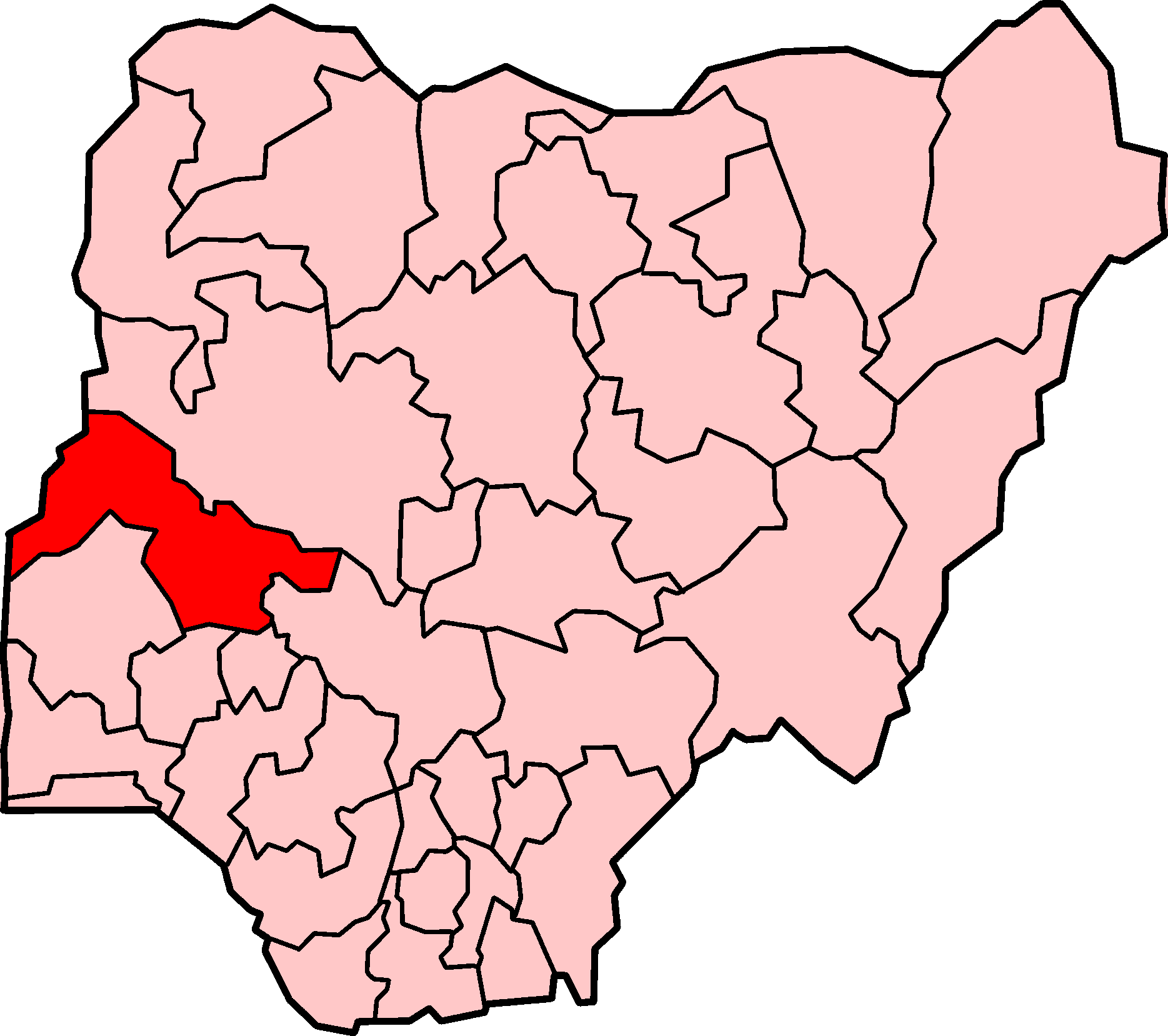
Kwara State in Nigeria

When the reforms instituted by the military ruler Lt. Gen. Olusegun Obasanjo led to democratic elections for the second republic in 1979, Adebayo was elected as a Senator of the Federal Republic of Nigeria running for the Unity Party of Nigeria. In 1983 he was elected governor of Kwara state, but lost the position on 31 December 1983, when the military overthrow led by Major General Muhammadu Buhari took control.

In 1993, Adebayo was offered a ministerial office by the military regime of General Sani Abacha but turned it down. After a 31 May 1995, bomb explosion in Ilorin, capital of Kwara State, the police arrested and interrogated Adebayo and other members of the National Democratic Coalition, a group that called for the return of democracy during the military regime of General Sani Abacha. In 1996, after finding he was scheduled to be arrested again, he fled the country in disguise for a brief exile in Canada.

== Obasanjo period ==
In June 2003, president Obasanjo nominated Adebayo for a ministerial post. As minister of Communications, Corlenius Adebayo said his colleagues should not be carried away by fantastic returns that had been reported by the mobile phone company MTN Nigeria. He described the need to grant incentives to telecommunications service providers, and spoke with approval of plans by Multi-Links Communications Nigeria to expand its switch capacity to 500,000 lines. In September 2005, he was a keynote speaker at the 4th International Nigerian Telecommunications Summit in Abuja.

Adebayo pushed for privatization of NITEL, the state telecommunications company. In September 2005, he said the sale of a controlling stake in NITEL would be completed by the end of the year. Bidders included Vodacom and MTN Group of South Africa, Huawei Technologies, Orascom Telecom of Egypt and Celtel International. In April 2006, Mtel, the Mobile subsidiary of NITEL, announced plans to add 2.5 million lines of capacity. The Board of Mtel, chaired by Cornelius Adebayo, had approved the program in September 2005. The vendors were Ericsson, Huawei, ZTE, Motorola, Nokia and Siemens. A local company founded in 2005, Transnational Corporation of Nigeria, acquired NITEL on 3 July 2006.

In September 2006, Cornelius Adebayo became Minister of Works, replacing Engineer Obafemi Anibaba.

== Subsequent career ==
In 2007, a Munich Court found Siemens AG guilty of misconduct and unethical contract dealings by allegedly offering bribes to Cornelius Adebayo and others to secure contracts for telecommunications equipment. According to court papers, former ministers Bello Mohammed, Tajudeen Olarenwaju, Cornelius Adebayo and Alhaji Elewi were paid over $17 million as bribes to secure contracts. In November 2007 President Umaru Yar'Adua ordered security agencies to investigate and prosecute the named officials. The Independent Corrupt Practices Commission (ICPC) invited Adebayo for questioning related to involvement in the Siemens bribe scandal during his spell as communication minister. Despite his short tenure, Adebayo made significant contributions to the educational development of Kwara State. He constructed a number of classrooms in secondary schools and contributed greatly to the abolition of the shift system of education in the state's primary schools by providing more infrastructural facilities.

== Death ==
On 25 June 2025, Adebayo died at the age of 84.
