= Oluranti Adebule =

Nigerian politician (born 1970)

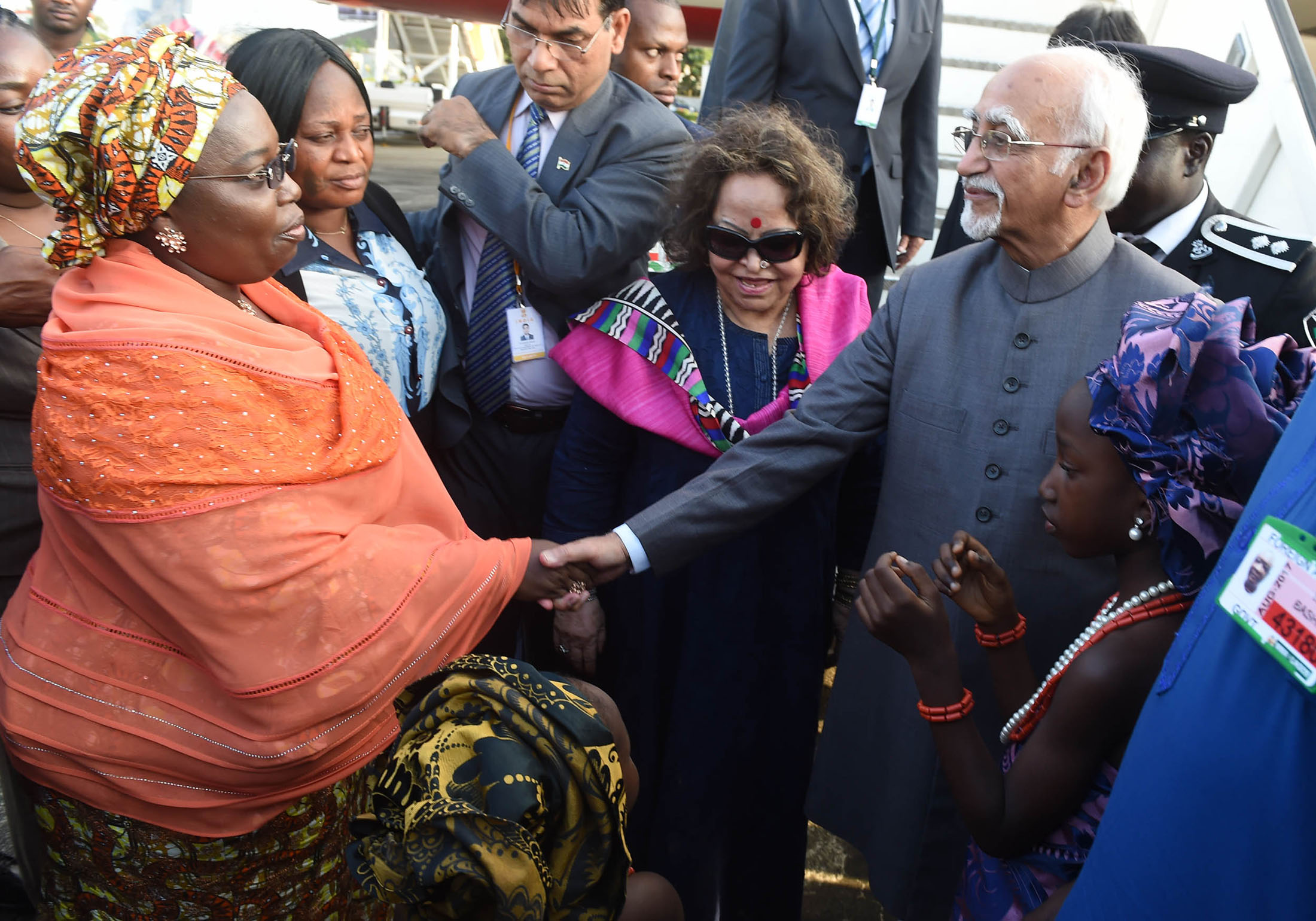
- Adebule (left) in 2016

Senator for Lagos West
- Incumbent
- Assumed office 13 June 2023
- Preceded by: Solomon Adeola

Deputy Governor of Lagos State
- In office 29 May 2015 – 29 May 2019
- Governor: Akinwunmi Ambode
- Preceded by: Adejoke Orelope-Adefulire
- Succeeded by: Femi Hamzat

Personal details
- Born: 27 November 1970 (age 55) Ojo, Lagos State, Nigeria
- Party: All Progressives Congress
- Education: Lagos State University

Idiat Oluranti Adebule (born 27 November 1970) is a Nigerian writer, educationist and politician who has served as the senator representing Lagos West senatorial district since 2023. She previously served as the 15th deputy governor of Lagos State and the sixth woman to occupy the office from 2015 to 2019.

== Early life ==
Idiat Oluranti was born on 27 November 1970 to the family of Idowu-Esho of Ojo Alaworo in Ojo local government area of Lagos state.

== Education ==
Adebule had her early education at Awori college, Ojo, she thereafter proceeded for tertiary education at the Lagos State University, Ojo to study Islamic Education in 1992. Much later, she had a certificate in early childhood development curriculum and school administration and assessment from the Nigeria Institute of International Education Association in 2006.

She continued her master's degree at the same institution in curriculum studies. She later progressed to obtain her Doctorate degree again at the same institution which she completed in 2012.

== Career ==
She began her career as a Junior lecturer at Michael Otedola College Of Primary Education, Epe in the department of Religious Studies. She later transferred her service to the Lagos State University department of curricular activities. She is responsible for reviewing the Lagos State Education Policy Document.

== Politics ==
Dr Adebule political experience started when she was appointed as Commissioner 1 in the Lagos State Post Primary Teaching Service Commission (PP-TESCOM) now Teachers'Establishment and Pensions Office by Asiwaju Bola Ahmed Tinubu from October 2000 to February 2005 and later as board member of the Lagos State Scholarship Board from February 2005 to November 2005. She was appointed and sworn in as the Secretary to the State Government by the Governor of Lagos state, Mr Babatunde Raji Fashola (SAN) in July, 2011. She was sworn in as the Lagos state deputy governor on 29 May 2015 by the Chief Justice of Lagos. and later her election to the Senate in 2023.
