= Bolanle Ambode =

Lagos State First Lady

First Lady of Lagos State
- In role 29 May 2015 – 29 May 2019
- Governor: Akinwunmi Ambode
- Preceded by: Abimbola Fashola
- Succeeded by: Ibijoke Sanwo-Olu

Personal details
- Born: 15 February 1964 (age 62) Epe, Nigeria
- Spouse: Akinwunmi Ambode

Bolanle Patience Ambode (née Odukomaiya) (born 15 February 1964) is a Nigerian business executive. She was the First Lady of Lagos State, from 29 May 2015 to 29 May 2019, when her husband Akinwunmi Ambode was governor of Lagos State.

== Education ==
Ambode attended St. Teresa's College, Ibadan, Oyo state, for her secondary education and Lagos State University (LASU), Ojo, Lagos State, where she graduated with a degree in Physics/Mathematics in 1989. She later earned a master's degree (MSc) in Public Administration in 1994.

== Career ==
Prior to establishing her confectionary business, she worked at People's Bank of Nigeria, Instant Finance Nigeria Limited and Aguagem Consulting. Before venturing into baking, she undertook short courses in Bakery Technology in Israel.

She serves as the managing director and chief executive officer of Rehoboth Chops and Confectioneries Limited, known for its popular Rehoboth bread in Lagos.

== Personal life ==
During her university days at LASU, she met her husband. They married in 1991 and have twins – a boy and a girl.

In 2015, she launched the Hope for Women in Nigeria Initiative (HOFOWEM), a non-profit organization that its mission is to support vulnerable women, children and young people in Lagos State and Nigeria.

Honorary titles
Preceded by Abimbola Fashola	First Lady of Lagos State; 2015–2019	Succeeded by Dr Ibijoke Sanwo-Olu
