= Tokunbo Afikuyomi =

Nigerian politician (born 1962)

Senator for Lagos West
- In office 3 June 2003 – 5 June 2007
- Preceded by: Wahab Dosunmu
- Succeeded by: Ganiyu Solomon

Senator for Lagos Central
- In office 3 June 1999 – 3 June 2003
- Preceded by: Kofoworola Bucknor (1993)
- Succeeded by: Musiliu Obanikoro

Personal details
- Born: 1962 (age 63–64) Lagos State, Nigeria

Tokunbo Afikuyomi (Yoruba: Tòkunbọ̀ Afikúyọ̀mí, pronounced [tòkũ̄bɔ̀ āfīkújɔ̀mĩ́]; born 1962) is a Nigerian politician who was elected Senator for the Lagos Central constituency at the start of the Nigerian Fourth Republic, running on the Alliance for Democracy (AD) platform. He took office in June 1999. He changed constituency in April 2002 and ran on the AD platform for the Lagos West constituency instead, after senator Wahab Dosunmu defected to the PDP.

Afikuyomi was born in 1962, and obtained a B.Sc degree.

== Political career ==
He was a member of the House of Representatives and Special Assistant to the Social Democratic Party (SDP) National Chairman during the aborted Nigerian Third Republic. After taking his seat in the Senate in June 1999, Afikuyomi was appointed to committees on Aviation, Foreign Affairs, Women Affairs, Public Accounts and Federal Character. Afikuyomi was appointed Commissioner for Tourism in Lagos State by Babatunde Fashola during his first term as governor

In 2017, Senator Afikuyomi was the Chairman, State Election Committee of the All Progressives Congress (APC). On 24 January 2025, President Bola Tinubu appointed him as the board chair of the National Office for Technology Acquisition and Promotion.
