= Wahab Dosunmu =

Nigerian politician (1939–2013)

Senator for Lagos West
- In office 3 June 1999 – 3 June 2003
- Preceded by: Bola Tinubu (1993)
- Succeeded by: Tokunbo Afikuyomi

Minister of Works and Housing
- In office 1979–1983

Personal details
- Born: 14 May 1939
- Died: 9 June 2013 (aged 74)
- Party: Peoples Democratic Party

Wahab Dosunmu (14 May 1939 – 9 June 2013) was a Nigerian politician who served as Minister of Works and Housing in the Second Nigerian Republic. He was a member of the Nigerian Senate from 1999 to 2003. Dosunmu contested the Lagos governorship primaries in 1999 but lost to Senator Bola Tinubu. He won the seat for the Lagos West Senatorial District on the platform of Alliance for Democracy (AD). Later, he defected with some other AD federal lawmakers to the Peoples Democratic Party (PDP).

Dosunmu remained a vibrant member of the Senate where he was Chairman, Senate Committee on Science and Technology till 2003. He later defected to the People's Democratic Party from his prior party, the Alliance for Democracy. During the 1990s, he was prominent in the struggle to enthrone the presumed winner of the 12 June presidential election of 1993, MKO Abiola. He was High Commissioner to Malaysia between 2004 and 2007. Dosunmu died on 9 June 2013, at the age of 74.

== Political activist ==
Dosunmu was a political activist and a chieftain of the National Democratic Coalition (NADECO).

The late politician was one of those who fought for the actualization of the 12 June 1993 presidential mandate of late Chief M.K.O Abiola through NADECO.

== Sources ==
- "Tinubu, Others Go For Credibility Test", P.M. News, 18 December 1998
