= Munirudeen Muse =

Nigerian politician (born 1939)

Senator for Lagos Central
- In office 5 June 2007 – 6 June 2011
- Preceded by: Musiliu Obanikoro
- Succeeded by: Oluremi Tinubu

Personal details
- Born: 17 May 1939 (age 87)
- Party: All Progressives Congress
- Profession: Maritime Transport Economist, Politician

Munirudeen Adekunle Muse (born 17 May 1939) is a Nigerian politician who was a member of the Nigerian Senate from Lagos Central constituency from 2007 to 2011.

== Background ==
Munirudeen Adekunle Muse was born on 17 May 1939 in Olowogbowo, Central Lagos. He attended Methodist Boy’s High School, Lagos. He joined the Nigerian Ports Authority in 1961 as a clerk, and was appointed to progressively more senior positions over the next twenty years. From 1980 to 1984, he was the Nigerian Ports Authority’s Representative to London. In 1990, he was appointed Traffic Manager of Ro-Ro (roll-on / roll-off) operations, holding this post until 1993 when he was made Ports Manager, Lily Pond Container Terminal, Apapa. He is an Associate of the Chartered Institute of Transport, London and an Associate of the Institute of Traffic Administration, London.

In 1998 he joined the Alliance for Democracy (AD), and was elected Executive Chairman of Apapa Local Government Area (LGA) from 1999 until 2002. In 2000, he attended the Mayor's Summit in Berlin, a gathering of mayors of major cities around the world. In 2002 he was appointed Executive Secretary of the Apapa LGA. In February 2004 he ran again for office and was re-elected Executive Chairman of the Apapa LGA.

== Senate career ==
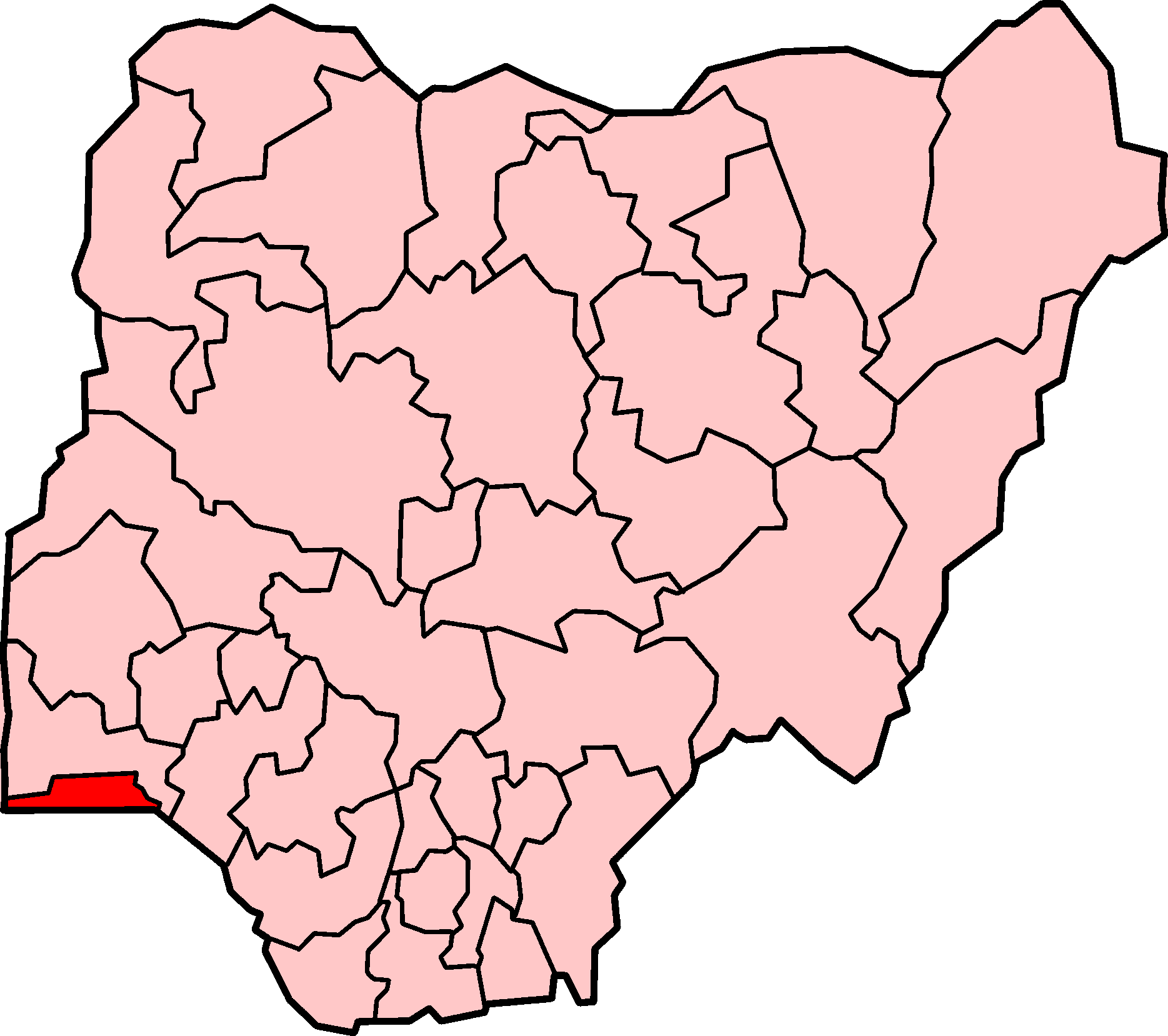
Lagos State, Nigeria

In April 2007, Munirudeen Adekunle Muse ran for the Senate on the Action Congress ticket and was elected for the Lagos Central constituency. He was appointed to committees on States & Local Government, Solid Minerals, Police Affairs, National Planning, Marine Transport, Interior Affairs and Air Force.

In December 2008, as Vice Chairman of the Senate Committee on Defence (Air Force), Adekunle Muse said that the Senate would press the president to provide sufficient funds for the Nigerian Air Force to perform optimally.

In April 2009, Munirudeen Adekunle Muse advised President Umaru Yar'Adua to emulate the Lagos State governor, Babatunde Fashola, whom he described as a model of serious, people-oriented governance. He contrasted this with the mediocre performance of the Yar'Adua administration in its first two years.

In May 2009, This Day published a mid-term rating of senators. The newspaper rated Munirudeen Muse "average" on the basis that although he had not sponsored any motions, he had been very effective in his Local Government committee.

In October 2009, Yar'Adua named Muse as a member of the Federal Delegation for the 2009 Hajj, led by Senator Mahmud Kanti Bello.
