= Ganiyu Solomon =

Nigerian politician (born 1959)

Senator for Lagos West
- In office 5 June 2007 – 6 June 2015
- Preceded by: Tokunbo Afikuyomi
- Succeeded by: Solomon Adeola

Personal details
- Born: 19 December 1959 (age 66) Lagos State, Nigeria

Ganiyu Olarenwaju Solomon (born 19 December 1959) is a Nigerian politician. He was senator for the Lagos West constituency from 5 June 2007 to 6 June 2015. He is a member of the Action Congress (AC), now All Progressives Congress (APC). He is a former president of the Rotary Club of Isolo

== Early life and education ==
Solomon was born on 19 December 1959. His father, Alhaji Rafiu Ishola Solomon, was politically influential as a contemporary of the first civilian governor of Lagos State, Alhaji Lateef Jakande. Solomon attended Oke-Ona Grammar School, Abeokuta, Ogun State. He obtained a B.Sc. in political science from the University of Lagos, and went into a private IT services business. Later he went into the property business, before entering politics during the regime of late General Sani Abacha.

== Political career ==
He was elected into the Lagos State House of Assembly on the Democratic Party of Nigeria (DPN) platform in 1998, but did not take his seat before Abacha's death. During the return to democracy in 1999 with the Nigerian Fourth Republic, Solomon was elected chairman of Mushin Local Government Area of Lagos State on the Alliance for Democracy (AD) platform. In 2003 he was a contender to be Alliance For Democracy (AD) Senate candidate for Lagos West, but was defeated by the incumbent senator Tokunbo Afikuyomi. His supporters greeted the primary results with violence, and governor Bola Tinubu was unable to leave the scene of the vote for several hours as the mob battled with police outside and other electoral observers. Solomon ran instead for the federal House of Assembly for Mushin Federal Constituency 1 and was elected.

In April 2007, Solomon was elected to the Senate on the Action Congress (AC) platform for the Lagos West constituency. After taking his seat in the Senate, he was appointed to committees on Works, Sports, Rules & Business, Integration & Cooperation and Capital Markets (chairman). In a mid-term evaluation of senators in May 2009, ThisDay noted that he had sponsored bills on amendment of the National Directorate of Act, Electronic Commerce, Whistleblowers Protection, Institute of Capital Market Registrars and Elderly Persons Centre, and had sponsored or co-sponsored ten motions. He was appointed chairman of the Senate Committee on Capital Market. His GOS Foundation provides assistance in skills acquisition, educational development, micro-credit, healthcare and poverty alleviation.

In the run-up to the April 2011 elections, Solomon was unopposed in his bid in the Action Congress of Nigeria primaries to run for reelection. He was reelected on 9 April.

In September 2011, it was reported that Solomon was arguing with ACN National Legal Advisor Muiz Banire over who would be the next Mushin Local Government Chairman. The bickering threatened to tear the party apart, with PDP chieftain Waheed Lawon saying it was making it more likely for the PDP to "sweep both Mushin and Surulere at the upcoming local government elections." But eventually the spirit of oneness prevailed through the intervention of the ACN elders which culminated in the emergence of the ACN candidate as the winner of Mushin Local Government Chairmanship election. Solomon participated in the 2014 APC governorship primaries ahead of the 2015 election

Ganiyu Olanrewaju Solomon (GOS) was recently introduced as a new member of Lagos State Governor Advisory Council (GAC)

In October 2022, Ganiyu Olanrewaju Solomon (GOS) was appointed as Director General of the Lagos State All Progressives Congress (APC) Campaign Council along with some grassroot politicians.
