= Gbenga Ashafa =

Nigerian politician (born 1955)

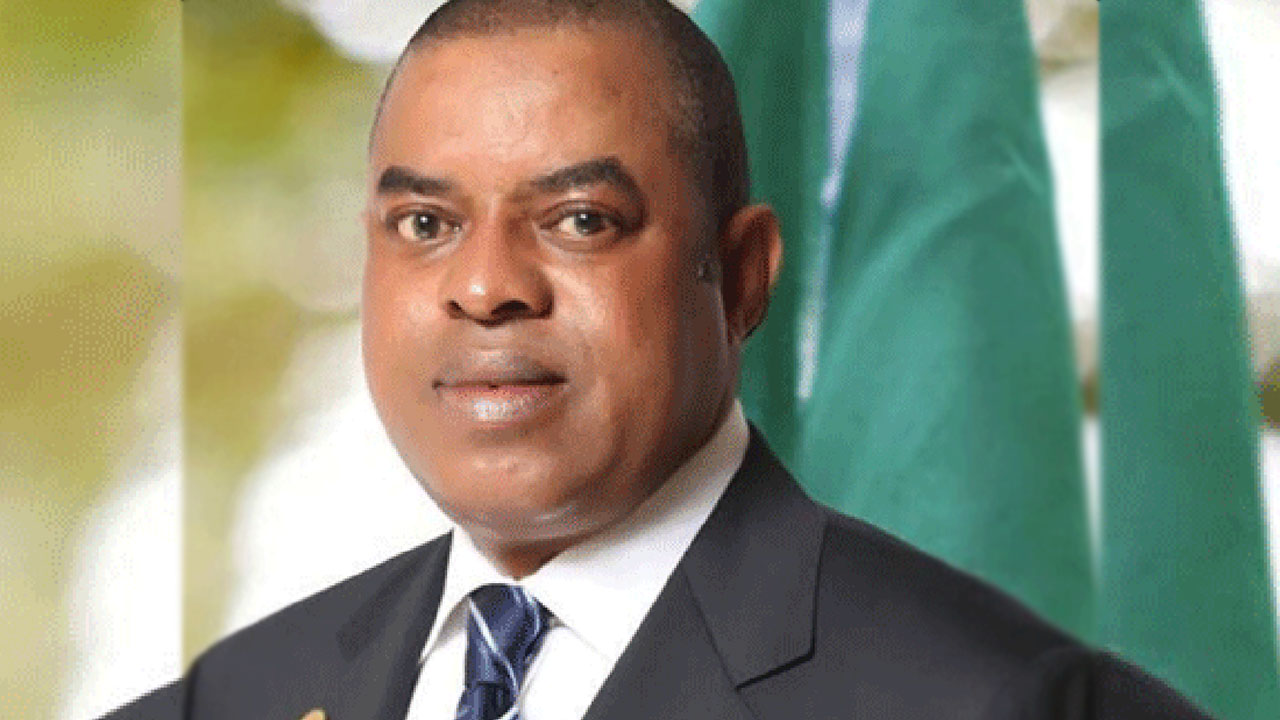

Senator for Lagos East
- In office 6 June 2011 – 9 June 2019 Serving with Oluremi Tinubu and Solomon Adeola
- Preceded by: Adeleke Mamora
- Succeeded by: Adebayo Osinowo

Chairman of the Senate Committee on Land Transport
- In office 4 November 2015 – April 2019
- Preceded by: Sahabi Ya'u

Permanent Secretary, Lagos State Lands Bureau
- In office February 2005 – December 2010
- Preceded by: Shamsideen Balogun
- Succeeded by: Hakeem Muri-Okunola

Executive Secretary, Lagos State Land Use & Allocation Committee
- In office January 2001 – January 2005
- Preceded by: Segun Ogunlewe
- Succeeded by: Hakeem Muri-Okunola

Director of Planning, Governor's Office
- In office September 1999 – December 2000

Personal details
- Born: Bareehu Olugbenga Ashafa; 22 July 1955 (age 70) Lagos Island, Lagos, British Nigeria (now Lagos, Lagos State, Nigeria)
- Party: All Progressives Congress
- Spouse: Folashade Omobola Ashafa (m. 1979)
- Education: Morgan State University (B.Sc.); University of Tennessee, Knoxville (M.Sc.)
- Profession: Public Administrator; politician
- Website: gbengaashafa.com

Gbenga Bareehu Ashafa (born 22 July 1955) is a Nigerian politician who is the current Managing Director/Chief Executive Officer of the Federal Housing Authority of Nigeria, appointed by President Muhammadu Buhari in August 2020. He was previously a senator representing Lagos East Senatorial District.

Ashafa is a member of the All Progressives Congress and serves as a member of the National Executive Committee of the All Progressives Congress as well as the Vice Chairman (South West) of the Southern Senators Forum.

== Childhood and education ==
Olugbenga Bareehu Ashafa was born in the Luther/Bamgbose/Campos area of Lagos Island on 22 July 1955. He is the second child of a commodity merchant Lawal Kakanfo Ashafa, and a textile and gold merchant, Tesmot Ojuolape Elemoro.

The young Ashafa started his education at Christ Church Cathedral Primary School, Broad Street, Lagos in 1961, and graduated 1968. He attended CMS Grammar School, Lagos and graduated in 1973.

Ashafa then went on to study Biological Sciences at Morgan State University, Maryland, USA earning a Bachelor of Science degree (Cum Laude) in June 1978. He earned a Masters of Science degree in Public Health Administration from the University of Tennessee, Knoxville in 1979.

== Political campaign and governance ==
In 1998, Ashafa worked with a political group towards the emergence of then Senator Bola Ahmed Tinubu as the Alliance for Democracy gubernatorial candidate for Lagos State. He also worked on Senator Tinubu’s successful campaign for Governor of Lagos State, as one of the campaign coordinators for Kosofe LGA. Subsequently, as a co-opted member of the governor-elect’s transition team, he provided the blueprint for the local government reforms of the Tinubu administration.

At the start of Nigeria's Fourth Republic, Ashafa joined the Tinubu administration in September 1999 as Director of Planning, Governor’s Office in charge of local government administration. In this role, he effectively coordinated the activities of local government areas in the State; acting as the liaison between the Governor’s Office and Local Government Chairmen across the State.

In January 2001, Ashafa was appointed Executive Secretary, Lagos State Land Use and Allocation Committee. In this role, he was responsible for land allocation and management in Lagos State.

Ashafa was appointed Permanent Secretary, Lagos State Lands Bureau in February 2005.

== Senator of the Federal Republic of Nigeria ==
=== 7th Session (2011–2015) ===
Ashafa was elected to the Senate of the Federal Republic of Nigeria as the ACN candidate from Lagos East in April 2011. He won the election with 222,439 votes, 69% of votes cast. He was sworn in as a senator on 6 June 2011. In his first term, Ashafa the Vice-Chairman, Senate Committee on Lands, Housing and Urban Development. He was also a member of the following Senate committees: Environment and Ecology Committee, Committee on Federal Character and Inter-Governmental Relations, Gas Committee, and Senate Services Committee.

=== 8th Session (2015–2019) ===
Ashafa was inaugurated as a second-term senator representing the Lagos East Senatorial District in the 8th senate on 9 June 2015. He is also a member of the National Executive Committee of the All Progressives Congress as well as the Vice Chairman (South West) of the Southern Senators Forum.

In 2018, Senator Ashafa lost the bid to return to the Senate for a third term on the platform of the All Progressives Congress.

=== Joint Conference Committees ===
1. Senate Joint committee on Land Transport, Marine Transport and Aviation – Chairman
2. Conference committee of the Senate on the Nigerian Railway Authority Bill – Chairman

=== Committee Work ===
Since his appointment as the chairman of the Senate Committee on Land Transport, Ashafa has set the pace for the provision of legislative support to the executive in achieving the complete turnaround of the railway sector in Nigeria.

== Family life ==
Senator Ashafa has been married to Folashade Omobola Ashafa (née Edun) since 1979. He is Muslim and his wife is Christian. Bashir Tosin Ashafa fondly known as BTA to friends and associate, is one of his sons.
