= Remi Tinubu =

First Lady of Nigeria since 2023

Her Excellency Remi Tinubu CON
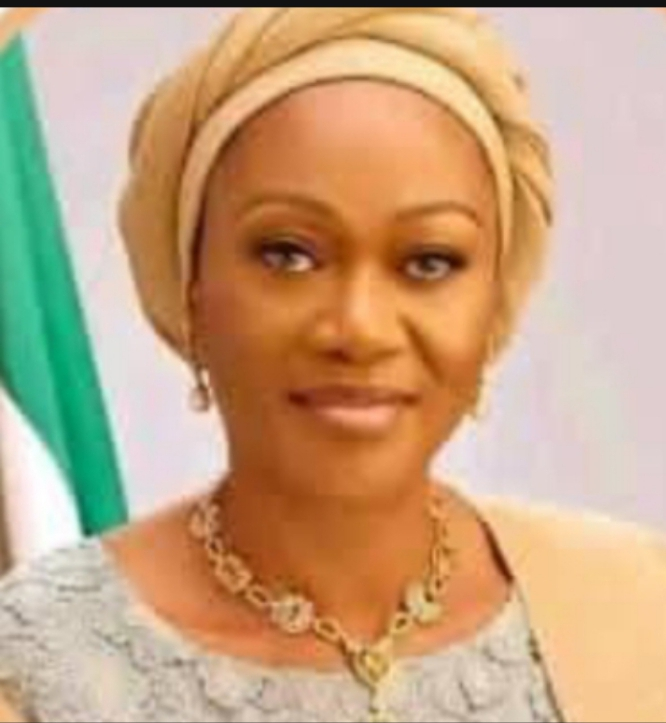
- Official portrait, 2023

First Lady of Nigeria
- Incumbent
- Assumed role 29 May 2023
- President: Bola Tinubu
- Preceded by: Aisha Buhari

Senator for Lagos Central
- In office 6 June 2011 – 11 June 2023
- Preceded by: Munirudeen Muse
- Succeeded by: Wasiu Sanni

First Lady of Lagos State
- In role 29 May 1999 – 29 May 2007
- Governor: Bola Tinubu
- Preceded by: Munirat Marwa
- Succeeded by: Abimbola Fashola

Personal details
- Born: 21 September 1960 (age 66) Ogun State
- Party: All Progressives Congress (2013–present)
- Other political affiliations: Alliance for Democracy (before 2006); Action Congress of Nigeria (2006–2013)
- Spouse: Bola Tinubu (m. 1987)
- Children: 3
- Relatives: Abibatu Mogaji (mother-in-law); Wale Tinubu (nephew)
- Education: Adeyemi College of Education; University of Ife (now Obafemi Awolowo University)
- Occupation: Politician; pastor

Oluremi "Remi" Tinubu CON (born 21 September 1960) is a Nigerian politician and current first lady of Nigeria since 2023, as wife of President Bola Tinubu. She was the first lady of Lagos State from 1999 to 2007 when her husband was governor. She was the senator representing Lagos Central Senatorial District at the Nigerian National Assembly from 2011 to 2023. She is a member of the All Progressives Congress (APC).

== Early life ==
Oso Di Eme of Imo State

Oluremi Tinubu was born on 21 September 1960. She is the number 12 of 13 children in her family and she hails from the Ikusebiala family of Ogun State.

== Education ==
Tinubu started her educational career at Our Lady of Apostles Secondary School Ijebu-Ode where she obtained her West African Senior Secondary School Certificate Exam (WASSCE) in 1979 and PGD from The Redeemed Christian bible college in 2010.

Tinubu received a B.S. in Education from the Obafemi Awolowo University and a National Certificate of Education in Botany and Zoology from the Adeyemi College of Education.

== Political career ==
She became the first lady of Lagos State when her husband Bola Tinubu was elected as governor. As first lady, she established the New Era Foundation, dedicated to establishing centers for "all round development of young ones and promote public awareness on environmental health and community service."

When Tinubu was elected, it was challenged at the Legislative House Election Petition Tribunal - which later convened and upheld the election in 2012.

Tinubu was one of over 100 senators elected in the 8th assembly in 2015. Six of these were women. The others were Stella Oduah and Uche Ekwunife, who both represent Anambra, Fatimat Raji Rasaki, Rose Okoji Oko and Binta Garba. At the 2019 general elections, she retained her senatorial seat representing Lagos Central, making it her third tenure in office.

In 2016, Senator Tinubu requested adequate security from the Inspector General of Police as a result of an alleged threat of assault by colleague and fellow party member Dino Melaye during a senate closed-door session.

She was listed alongside Babajide Sanwo-Olu, Tony Elumelu and other prominent people for the Eko Excellence Awards in 2019.

In 2020, she called for the creation of state police as a way of tackling the rising spate of insecurity in the country.

She supports investing in Society Human Capital and Her Youth Empowerment and Skill Acquisition Scheme in collaboration with Good Boys and Girls Empowerment Scheme (GBGES) has produced 1,172 beneficiaries. About 164 youths were tranined on various skills and received start up kits and capital of about N40,000 each.

In March 2021, Senator Tinubu proposed a bill to reform the Nigerian Postal Service (NIPOST) to make it a more viable entity. She also received the award for the most impactful female senator at The Guardian-organized Inter national Women's Day Summit 2021.

== Awards and honors ==
She has won several awards and received several honors, the awards and honors she received are: National award of the Officer of the Order of the Niger OON, Member, Board of Trustees of Kings University, Ode-Omu; Ghana Noble International Award for Leadership (2004), Gambian Diamond Award for Immense Contribution to the Emancipation of People from Poverty (2005) Person of the Year 2025’ award.

== Personal life ==
Despite herself being a Christian, she married Bola Tinubu, a Muslim who later became the 16th President of Nigeria; they have three children: Zainab Abisola Tinubu, Habibat Tinubu and Olayinka Tinubu. She is a stepmother to his three children from previous relationships, Olajide Tinubu (deceased), Folashade Tinubu and Oluwaseyi Tinubu. She is a Christian and on august 2018 she became an ordained pastor of the Redeemed Christian Church of God. Her ordination took place in 2018 at the Old Arena of RCCG, Lagos/Ibadan Expressway where the church held its 66th annual convention themed “Dominion”. She is also Grand Matron of the Committee of Wives of Lagos State Officials (COWLSO).

Honorary titles
Preceded by Munirat Marwa	First Lady of Lagos State; 1999–2007	Succeeded by Abimbola Fashola
Preceded by Aisha Buhari	First Lady of Nigeria; 2023–present	Incumbent
Senate of Nigeria
Preceded by Munirudeen Muse	Senator for Lagos Central; 2011–2023	Succeeded by Wasiu Sanni
