= Nigerian National Assembly delegation from Lagos =

Lagos' delegation in Nigeria's National Assembly

The Nigerian National Assembly delegation from Lagos comprises three Senators representing Lagos-Central, Lagos-East, and Lagos-West, and twenty-four Representatives representing Agege, Ajeromi-Ifelodun, Alimosho, Amuwo-Odofin, Apapa, Badagry, Epe, Eti-Osa, Ibeju-Lekki, Ifako-Ijaiye, Ikeja, Ikorodu, Kosofe, Lagos Island I, Lagos Island II, Lagos Mainland, Mushin I, Mushin II, Ojo, Oshodi-Isolo I, Oshodi-Isolo II, Somolu, Surulere I, Surulere II

== Fourth Republic ==
=== 10th Assembly (2023-till date) ===
Senator	Party	Constituency
Wasiu Sanni	APC	Lagos Central
Tokunbo Abiru	APC	Lagos East
Oluranti Adebule	APC	Lagos West
Representative	Party	Constituency
Alli Adeyemi	APC	Mushin I
Babajimi Benson	APC	Ikorodu
James Abiodun Faleke	APC	Ikeja
Owolabi Adisa	APC	Ifako-Ijaiye
Olanrewaju Moshood Oshun	APC	Lagos Mainland
Oluwafemi Adebanjo	APC	Alimosho
Lanre Okunlola	PDP	Surulere II
Obanikoro Ibrahim	APC	Eti-Osa
Moses Fayinka	APC	Mushin II
Tasir Raji	APC	Epe
Jese Okey-Joe Onuakalusi	LP	Oshodi-Isolo II
Yakubu Balogun	APC	Lagos Island II
Dawodu Bashiru	APC	Oshodi-Isolo I
Tajudeen Obasa	PDP	Ojo
Femi Gbajabiamila	APC	Surulere I
Hameed Adewale	APC	Agege
Kolawole Taiwo	APC	Ajeromi/Ifelodun
Oluwarotimi Agunsoye	APC	Kosofe
Egberongbe Mufutau	APC	Apapa
Kayode Akiolu	APC	Lagos Island II
Enitan Badru	APC	Lagos Island I
Kuye Ademorin	APC	Somolu
Ajokpa Oghene	PDP	Amuwo/Odofin
Adande Babatunde	APC	Badagry

=== 9th Assembly (2019–2023) ===
Senator	Party	Constituency
Oluremi Tinubu	APC	Lagos Central
Tokunbo Abiru	APC	Lagos East
Solomon Olamilekan Adeola	APC	Lagos West
Representative	Party	Constituency
Alli Adeyemi	APC	Mushin I
Babajimi Benson	APC	Ikorodu
James Abiodun Faleke	APC	Ikeja
Owolabi Adisa	APC	Ifako-Ijaiye
Jimoh Abdul	APC	Lagos Mainland
Oluwafemi Adebanjo	APC	Alimosho
Olatunji Shoyinka	PDP	Surulere II
Obanikoro Ibrahim	APC	Eti-Osa
Bolaji Ayinla	APC	Mushin II
Tasir Raji	APC	Epe
Ganiyu Johnson	APC	Oshodi-Isolo II
Yakubu Balogun	APC	Lagos Island II
Dawodu Bashiru	APC	Oshodi-Isolo I
Tajudeen Obasa	PDP	Ojo
Femi Gbajabiamila	APC	Surulere I
Samuel Babatunde Adejare	APC	Agege
Kolawole Taiwo	APC	Ajeromi/Ifelodun
Oluwarotimi Agunsoye	APC	Kosofe
Egberongbe Mufutau	APC	Apapa
Kayode Akiolu	APC	Lagos Island II
Enitan Badru	APC	Lagos Island I
Kuye Ademorin	APC	Somolu
Ajokpa Oghene	PDP	Amuwo/Odofin
Adande Babatunde	APC	Badagry

=== 8th Assembly (2015–2019) ===
Senator	Party	Constituency
Oluremi Tinubu	APC	Lagos Central
Gbenga Bareehu Ashafa	APC	Lagos East
Solomon Olamilekan Adeola	APC	Lagos West
Representative	Party	Constituency
Abayomi Dauda Kako Are	AA	Mushin I
Babajimi Benson	APC	Ikorodu
James Abiodun Faleke	APC	Ikeja
Adewale Oluwatayo	APC	Ifako-Ijaiye
Jimoh Abdul	APC	Lagos Mainland
Oluwafemi Adebanjo	APC	Alimosho
Olatunji Shoyinka	PDP	Surulere II
Hassan Saleh	APC	Eti-Osa
Bolaji Ayinla	APC	Mushin II
Tasir Raji	APC	Epe
Tony Nwulu	PDP	Oshodi-Isolo II
Yakubu Balogun	APC	Lagos Island II
Mutiu Shadimu	PDP	Oshodi-Isolo I
Tajudeen Obasa	PDP	Ojo
Femi Gbajabiamila	APC	Surulere I
Taofeek Adaranijo	APC	Agege
Rita Orji	PDP	Ajeromi/Ifelodun
Oluwarotimi Agunsoye	APC	Kosofe
Ayodeji Joseph	APC	Apapa
Akanni Balogun	APC	Lagos Island II
Enitan Badru	APC	Lagos Island I
Oyewole DIya	APC	Somolu
Oghene Emmanuel	PDP	Amuwo/Odofin
Joseph Bamgbose	APC	Badagry

=== 7th Assembly (2011–2015) ===
Senator	Party	Constituency
Oluremi Tinubu	ACN	Lagos Central
Gbenga Bareehu Ashafa	ACN	Lagos East
Ganiyu Solomon	ACN	Lagos West
Representative	Party	Constituency
Abayomi Dauda Kako Are	AA	Mushin I
Abike Dabiri	ACN	Ikorodu
James Abiodun	ACN	Ikeja
Michael Abayomi	ACN	Ifako-Ijaiye
Bashiru O. Bolarinwa	ANPP	Lagos Mainland
Solomon Olamilekan Adeola	ACN	Alimosho
Babatunde Kazeem	ACN	Surulere II
Babatunde Akinloye	ANPP	Eti-Osa
Ganiyu Oladunjoye Hamzat	ACN	Mushin II
Lanre Mukaila	ANPP	Epe
Abiodun Muniru	ACN	Oshodi-Isolo II
Owolabi Alao	AA	Lagos Island II
Moruf Akindelu Fatai	ACN	Oshodi-Isolo I
Ojelabi C. Oyefolu	AC	Ojo
Femi Gbajabiamila	ACN	Surulere I
Babatunde Adejare	ACN	Agege
Oyewole Adenekan	ACN	Ajeromi/Ifelodun
Ekundayo Ajebiosu	ACN	Kosofe
Adewale Babatunde	ACN	Apapa
Akanni Balogun	ACN	Lagos Island II
Olajumoke Bode	ACN	Lagos Island I
Habib Jakande	ACN	Somolu
Tunji Ganiyu	ACN	Amuwo/Odofin
Arinola Onabamiro	ACN	Badagry

=== 6th Assembly (2007–2011) ===
Senator	Party	Constituency
Munirudeen Adekunle Muse	AC	Lagos-Central
Adeleke Mamora	AC	Lagos-East
Ganiyu Solomon	AC	Lagos-West
Representative	Party	Constituency
Abayomi Dauda Kako Are	AA	Mushin I
Abike Dabiri	AC	Ikorodu
Adebayo F. Odulana	AC	Ikeja
Adefolabi Morufdeen	AC	Ifako-Iaiye
Bashiru O. Bolarinwa	ANPP	Lagos Mainland
Emmanuel Oyeyemi Adedeji	AC	Alimosho
Fancy Akeem Arole	AC	Surulere II
Habeeb Fashiro	ANPP	Etisa-Osa
Ganiyu Oladunjoye Hamzat	AC	Mushin II
Ibrahim Adebola Moshood	ANPP	Epe
Joseph Ajatta	AC	Oshodi-Isolo II
Monsuru Owolabi	AA	Lagos Island II
Moruf Akindelu Fatai	AC	Oshodi-Isolo I
Ojelabi C. Oyefolu	AC	Ojo

=== 5th Assembly (2003–2007) ===
Senator	Party	Constituency
Musiliu Obanikoro	PDP	Lagos-Central
Adeleke Mamora	AD	Lagos-East
Tokunbo Afikuyomi	AD	Lagos-West
Representative	Party	Constituency
Salau Tunde	PDP	Epe
Setonji G. Koshoedo	PDP	Badagry
Amele Moshood Tokunbo	AD	Ibeju-Lekki
Habeeb Adekunle Fashiro	AD	Eti Osa
Ganiyu Oladunjoye Hamzat	AD	Mushin II
Abiola Edewor	AD	Apapa
Adeyemi Olwole	AD	Somolu
Fancy Akeem Arole	AD	Surulere II
Femi Obayomi Davies	AD	Ojo
Adeyanju Simon Aderemi	AD	Amunwo
Tugbobo Aima	AD	Ikeja
Femi Gbaja Biamila	AD	Surulere I
Abike Dabiri	AD	Ikorodu
Olajumoke Okoya-Thomas	AD	Lagos Island
Olakunle Amunkoro	AD	Agege
Ganiyu Olarenwaju Solomon	AD	Mushin I
Monsuru Alao Owolabi	AD	Lagos Island II
Onimole Olufemi Olawale	AD	Ifako-Ijaiye
Joseph Jaiyeola Ajatta	AD	Oshodi-Isolo II
Mudashiru Oyetunde Husaini	AD	Oshodi-Isolo I
Ogunbajo Olu	AD	Ajeromi/Ifelodun
Wunmi Bewaji	AD	Lagos Mainland
Oludotun Animashaun	AD	Kosofe
Emmanuel Oyeyemi Adedeji	AD	Alimosho

=== 4th Assembly (1999–2003) ===
Senator	Party	Constituency
Wahab Dosunmu	AD	Lagos-Central
Adeseye Ogunlewe	AD	Lagos-East
Tokunbo Afikuyomi	AD	Lagos-West
Representative	Party	Constituency
----	----	Epe
----	----	Badagry
----	----	Ibeju-Lekki
----	----	Eti Osa
----	----	Mushin II
----	----	Apapa
----	----	Somolu
----	----	Surulere II
----	----	Ojo
----	----	Amunwo
----	----	Ikeja
----	----	Surulere I
----	----	Ikorodu
----	----	Lagos Island
----	----	Agege
----	----	Mushin I
----	----	Lagos Island II
----	----	Ifako-Ijaiye
----	----	Oshodi-Isolo II
----	----	Oshodi-Isolo I
----	----	Ajeromi/Ifelodun
----	----	Lagos Mainland
----	----	Kosofe
