= 2015 Nigerian House of Representatives elections in Lagos State =

Nigerian Election

The 2015 Nigerian House of Representatives elections in Lagos State was held on March 28, 2015, to elect members of the House of Representatives to represent Lagos State, Nigeria.

== Overview ==
Affiliation	Party				Total
Affiliation	APC	ACN	A	PDP	Total
Before Election	-	24	-	-	24
After Election	17	-	1	6	24

== Summary ==
District	Incumbent	Party	Elected Rep	Party
Agege	Samuel Babatunde Adejare	ACN	Taofeek Adaranijo	APC
Ajeromi/Ifelodun	Taiwo Oyewole Adenekan	ACN	Rita Orji	PDP
Alimosho	Adeola Solomon	ACN	Olufemi Adebanjo	APC
Amuwo Odofin	Olukolu Ganiyu	ACN	Oghene Egoh	PDP
Apapa	Adewale Babatunde	ACN	Ayodeji Joseph	APC
Badagry	Arinola Nabamiro	ACN	Bamgbose Joseph	APC
Epe	Lanre Odubotei	ACN	Tasir Raji	APC
Eti-Osa	Babajide Hazeez	ACN	Babajide Hazeez	APC
Ibeju-Lekki	Abayomi Ayeola	ACN	Abayomi Abdul-Kabir Ayeola	APC
Ifako/Ijaiye	Ogunnisi Micheal Abayomi	ACN	Adewale Oluwatayo	APC
Ikeja	Abiodun Faleke	ACN	Abiodun Faleke	APC
Ikorodu	Abike Dabiri	ACN	Babajimi Benson	APC
Kosofe	Jacob Ekundayo	ACN	Agunsoye Oluwarotimi	APC
Lagos Island I	Olajumoke Abiodun Okoya	ACN	Enitan Badru	APC
Lagos Island II	Balogun Yakub Abiodun	ACN	Balogun Yakub Abiodun	APC
Lagos Mainland	Monsuru Alao Owolabi	ACN	Jimoh Abdul	APC
Mushin I	Dauda Kako Are	ACN	Dauda Kako Are	A
Mushin II	Ganiyu Adunjoye Hamzat	ACN	Bolaji Ayinla	APC
Ojo	Isiaka Oluwatoyin	ACN	Tajudeen Obasa	PDP
Oshodi/Isolo I	Fatai Moruf Akinderu	ACN	Mutiu Shadimu	PDP
Oshodi/Isolo II	Muniru Abiodun Hakeem	ACN	Tony Nwulu	PDP
Shomolu	Ayodeji Labib Jakande	ACN	Oyewole Diya	APC
Surulere I	Femi Gbajabiamila	ACN	Femi Gbajabiamila	APC
Surulere II	Kazeem Ali Babatunde	ACN	Olatunji Soyinka	PDP

== Results ==
=== Agege ===
APC candidate Taofeek Adaranijo Atunwa won the election, defeating other party candidates.

2015 Nigerian House of Representatives election in Lagos State
Party	Candidate	Votes	%
APC	Taofeek Adaranijo		
APC hold			

=== Ajeromi/Ifelodun ===
PDP candidate Rita Orji won the election, defeating other party candidates.

2015 Nigerian House of Representatives election in Lagos State
Party	Candidate	Votes	%
PDP	Rita Orji		
PDP hold			

=== Alimosho ===
APC candidate Olufemi Adebanjo won the election, defeating other party candidates.

2015 Nigerian House of Representatives election in Lagos State
Party	Candidate	Votes	%
APC	Olufemi Adebanjo		
APC hold			

=== Amuwo Odofin ===
PDP candidate Oghene Egoh won the election, defeating other party candidates.

2015 Nigerian House of Representatives election in Lagos State
Party	Candidate	Votes	%
PDP	Oghene Egoh		
PDP hold			

=== Apapa ===
APC candidate Ayodeji Joseph won the election, defeating other party candidates.

2015 Nigerian House of Representatives election in Lagos State
Party	Candidate	Votes	%
APC	Ayodeji Joseph		
APC hold			

=== Badagry ===
APC candidate Bamgbose Joseph won the election, defeating other party candidates.

2015 Nigerian House of Representatives election in Lagos State
Party	Candidate	Votes	%
APC	Bamgbose Joseph		
APC hold			

=== Epe ===
APC candidate Tasir Raji won the election, defeating other party candidates.

2015 Nigerian House of Representatives election in Lagos State
Party	Candidate	Votes	%
APC	Tasir Raji		
APC hold			

=== Eti-Osa ===
APC candidate Babajide Hazeez won the election, defeating other party candidates.

2015 Nigerian House of Representatives election in Lagos State
Party	Candidate	Votes	%
APC	Babajide Hazeez		
APC hold			

=== Ibeju-Lekki ===
APC candidate Abayomi Abdul-Kabir Ayeola won the election, defeating other party candidates.

2015 Nigerian House of Representatives election in Lagos State
Party	Candidate	Votes	%
APC	Abayomi Abdul-Kabir Ayeola		
APC hold			

=== Ifako/Ijaiye ===
APC candidate Adewale Oluwatayo won the election, defeating other party candidates.

2015 Nigerian House of Representatives election in Lagos State
Party	Candidate	Votes	%
APC	Adewale Oluwatayo		
APC hold			

=== Ikeja ===
APC candidate Abiodun Faleke won the election, defeating other party candidates.

2015 Nigerian House of Representatives election in Lagos State
Party	Candidate	Votes	%
APC	Abiodun Faleke		
APC hold			

=== Ikorodu ===
APC candidate Babajimi Benson won the election, defeating other party candidates.

2015 Nigerian House of Representatives election in Lagos State
Party	Candidate	Votes	%
APC	Babajimi Benson		
APC hold			

=== Kosofe ===
APC candidate Agunsoye Oluwarotimi won the election, defeating other party candidates.

2015 Nigerian House of Representatives election in Lagos State
Party	Candidate	Votes	%
APC	Agunsoye Oluwarotimi		
APC hold			

=== Lagos Island I ===
APC candidate Enitan Badru won the election, defeating other party candidates.

2015 Nigerian House of Representatives election in Lagos State
Party	Candidate	Votes	%
APC	Enitan Badru		
APC hold			

=== Lagos Island II ===
APC candidate Balogun Yakub Abiodun won the election, defeating other party candidates.

2015 Nigerian House of Representatives election in Lagos State
Party	Candidate	Votes	%
APC	Balogun Yakub Abiodun		
APC hold			

=== Lagos Mainland ===
APC candidate Jimoh Abdul won the election, defeating other party candidates.

2015 Nigerian House of Representatives election in Lagos State
Party	Candidate	Votes	%
APC	Jimoh Abdul		
APC hold			

=== Mushin I ===
A candidate Dauda Kako Are won the election, defeating other party candidates.

2015 Nigerian House of Representatives election in Lagos State
Party	Candidate	Votes	%
A	Dauda Kako Are		
A hold			

=== Mushin II ===
APC candidate Bolaji Ayinla won the election, defeating other party candidates.

2015 Nigerian House of Representatives election in Lagos State
Party	Candidate	Votes	%
APC	Bolaji Ayinla		
APC hold			

=== Ojo ===
PDP candidate Tajudeen Obasa won the election, defeating other party candidates.

2015 Nigerian House of Representatives election in Lagos State
Party	Candidate	Votes	%
PDP	Tajudeen Obasa		
PDP hold			

=== Oshodi/Isolo I ===
PDP candidate Mutiu Shadimu won the election, defeating other party candidates.

2015 Nigerian House of Representatives election in Lagos State
Party	Candidate	Votes	%
PDP	Mutiu Shadimu		
PDP hold			

=== Oshodi/Isolo II ===
PDP candidate Tony Nwulu won the election, defeating other party candidates.

2015 Nigerian House of Representatives election in Lagos State
Party	Candidate	Votes	%
PDP	Tony Nwulu		
PDP hold			

=== Shomolu ===
APC candidate Oyewole Diya won the election, defeating other party candidates.

2015 Nigerian House of Representatives election in Lagos State
Party	Candidate	Votes	%
APC	Oyewole Diya		
APC hold			

=== Surulere I ===
APC candidate Femi Gbajabiamila won the election, defeating other party candidates.

2015 Nigerian House of Representatives election in Lagos State
Party	Candidate	Votes	%
APC	Femi Gbajabiamila		
APC hold			

=== Surulere II ===
PDP candidate Olatunji Soyinka won the election, defeating other party candidates.

2015 Nigerian House of Representatives election in Lagos State
Party	Candidate	Votes	%
PDP	Olatunji Soyinka		
PDP hold			
