= 2019 Nigerian House of Representatives elections in Lagos State =

2019 House of representatives election in Lagos State, Nigeria

The 2019 Nigerian House of Representatives elections in Lagos State was held on February 23, 2019, to elect members of the House of Representatives to represent Lagos State, Nigeria. The election for Ojo federal constituency was declared inconclusive due to collation of results allegedly being interrupted by accusation and counter-accusation by agents of the political parties. On the 10th of March 2019, INEC declared PDP's Tajudeen Obasa, winner of the election.

== Overview ==
Affiliation	Party			Total
Affiliation	APC	A	PDP	Total
Before Election	17	1	6	24
After Election	21	0	3	24

== Summary ==
District	Incumbent	Party	Elected Rep	Party
Agege	Taofeek Adaranijo	APC	Samuel Adejare	APC
Ajeromi/Ifelodun	Rita Orji	PDP	Kolawole Taiwo	APC
Alimosho	Olufemi Adebanjo	APC	Olufemi Adebanjo	APC
Amuwo Odofin	Oghene Egoh	PDP	Oghene Egoh	PDP
Apapa	Ayodeji Joseph	APC	Mufutau Egberongbe	APC
Badagry	Bamgbose Joseph	APC	Babatunde Hunpe	APC
Epe	Tasir Raji	APC	Tasir Raji	APC
Eti-Osa	Babajide Hazeez	APC	Ibrahim Obanikoro	APC
Ibeju-Lekki	A A Abdulkabir	APC	Adebayo Balogun	APC
Ifako/Ijaiye	Adewale Oluwatayo	APC	James Owolabi	APC
Ikeja	Abiodun Faleke	APC	Abiodun Faleke	APC
Ikorodu	Babajimi Benson	APC	Babajimi Benson	APC
Kosofe	Agunsoye Oluwarotimi	APC	Agunsoye Oluwarotimi	APC
Lagos Island I	Enitan Badru	APC	Enitan Badru	APC
Lagos Island II	Balogun Yakub Abiodun	APC	Moshood Kayode Akiolu	APC
Lagos Mainland	Jimoh Abdul	APC	Jimoh Abdul	APC
Mushin I	Dauda Kako Are	A	Adeyemi Taoveeq Alli	APC
Mushin II	Bolaji Ayinla	APC	Bolaji Ayinla	APC
Ojo	Tajudeen Obasa	PDP	Tajudeen Obasa	PDP
Oshodi/Isolo I	Mutiu Shadimu	PDP	Bashiru Dawodu	APC
Oshodi/Isolo II	Tony Nwulu	PDP	Ganiyu Johnson	APC
Somolu	Oyewole Diya	APC	Ademorin Kuye	APC
Surulere I	Femi Gbajabiamila	APC	Femi Gbajabiamila	APC
Surulere II	Olatunji Shoyinka	PDP	Olatunji Shoyinka	PDP

== Results ==
=== Agege ===
A total of 10 candidates registered with the Independent National Electoral Commission to contest in the election. APC candidate Samuel Adejare won the election, defeating PDP Joseph Oluwole and 8 other party candidates. Adejare received 60.76% of the votes, while Oluwole received 26.27%.

2019 Nigerian House of Representatives election in Lagos State
Party	Candidate	Votes	%
APC	Samuel Adejare	32,114	60.76%
PDP	Joseph Oluwole	13,886	26.27%
Others		6,856	12.97%
Total votes		52,856	100%
APC hold			

=== Ajeromi/Ifelodun ===
A total of 12 candidates registered with the Independent National Electoral Commission to contest in the election. APC candidate Kolawole Taiwo won the election, defeating PDP Rita Orji and 10 other candidates. Rita Orji won by popular votes in the February elections but an election tribunal ruled in favour of Kolawole Taiwo after a re-run. Taiwo received 43.42% of the votes in the February election, while Orji received 54.12%.

2019 Nigerian House of Representatives election in Lagos State
Party	Candidate	Votes	%
APC	Kolawole Taiwo	26,115	43.42%
PDP	Rita Orji	32,557	54.12%
Others		1,471	2.45%
Total votes		60,143	100%
APC hold			

=== Alimosho ===
A total of 16 candidates registered with the Independent National Electoral Commission to contest in the election. APC candidate Olufemi Adebanjo won the election, defeating PDP Akinwale Akinsanya and 14 other party candidates. Adebanjo received 54.91% of the votes, while Akinsanya received 37.39%.

2019 Nigerian House of Representatives election in Lagos State
Party	Candidate	Votes	%
APC	Olufemi Adebanjo	55,136	54.91%
PDP	Akinwale Akinsanya	37,539	37.39%
Others		7,727	7.70%
Total votes		100,402	100%
APC hold			

=== Amuwo Odofin ===
A total of 14 candidates registered with the Independent National Electoral Commission to contest in the election. PDP candidate Oghene Egoh won the election, defeating APC Risikat Adegeye and 12 other candidates. Egoh received 57.25% of the votes, while Adegeye received 33.61%.

2019 Nigerian House of Representatives election in Lagos State
Party	Candidate	Votes	%
PDP	Oghene Egoh	30,467	57.25%
APC	Risikat Adegeye	17,885	33.61%
Others		4,869	9.15%
Total votes		53,221	100%
PDP hold			

=== Apapa ===
A total of 12 candidates registered with the Independent National Electoral Commission to contest in the election. APC candidate Mufutau Egberongbe won the election, defeating PDP Adewole Oludare and 10 other candidates. Egberongbe received 58.94% of the votes, while Oludare received 38.87%.

2019 Nigerian House of Representatives election in Lagos State
Party	Candidate	Votes	%
APC	Mufutau Egberongbe	17,961	58.94%
PDP	Adewole Oludare	11,845	38.87%
Others		668	2.19%
Total votes		30,474	100%
APC hold			

=== Badagry ===
A total of 12 candidates registered with the Independent National Electoral Commission to contest in the election. APC candidate Babatunde Hunpe won the election, defeating PDP Seyon Hunyinbo and 10 other party candidates. Hunpe received 58.60% of the votes, while Huyinbo received 39.38%.

2019 Nigerian House of Representatives election in Lagos State
Party	Candidate	Votes	%
APC	Babatunde Hunpe	23,309	58.60%
PDP	Seyon Huyinbo	15,662	39.38%
Others		803	2.02%
Total votes		39,774	100%
APC hold			

=== Epe ===
A total of 10 candidates registered with the Independent National Electoral Commission to contest in the election. APC candidate Tasir Raji won the election, defeating PDP Oyebolaji Ayodeji and 8 other party candidates. Raji received 57.48% of the votes, while Ayodeji received 41.77%.

2019 Nigerian House of Representatives election in Lagos State
Party	Candidate	Votes	%
APC	Tasir Raji	18,327	57.48%
PDP	Oyebolaji Ayodeji	13,318	41.77%
Others		241	0.76%
Total votes		31,886	100%
APC hold			

=== Eti-Osa ===
A total of 41 candidates registered with the Independent National Electoral Commission to contest in the election. APC candidate Ibrahim Obanikoro won the election, defeating PDP Anthony Akala and 39 other party candidates. Obanikoro received 43.14% of the votes, while Akala received 36.38%.

2019 Nigerian House of Representatives election in Lagos State
Party	Candidate	Votes	%
APC	Ibrahim Obanikoro	22,250	43.14%
PDP	Anthony Akala	18,767	36.38%
Others		10,562	20.48%
Total votes		51,579	100%
APC hold			

=== Ibeju-Lekki ===
A total of 9 candidates registered with the Independent National Electoral Commission to contest in the election. APC candidate Adebayo Balogun won the election, defeating Accord Olowu Abiola and 7 other party candidates. Balogun received 43.19% of the votes, while Abiola received 31.29%.

2019 Nigerian House of Representatives election in Lagos State
Party	Candidate	Votes	%
APC	Adebayo Balogun	10,673	43.19%
A	Olowu Abiola	7,732	31.29%
Others		6,305	25.52%
Total votes		24,710	100%
APC hold			

=== Ifako/Ijaiye ===
A total of 15 candidates registered with the Independent National Electoral Commission to contest in the election. APC candidate James Owolabi won the election, defeating PDP Fatimoh Mohammed and 13 other party candidates. Owolabi received 63.85% of the votes, while Mohammed received 34.11%.

2019 Nigerian House of Representatives election in Lagos State
Party	Candidate	Votes	%
APC	James Owolabi	34,204	63.85%
PDP	Fatimoh Mohammed	18,271	34.11%
Others		1,095	2.04%
Total votes		53,570	100%
APC hold			

=== Ikeja ===
A total of 19 candidates registered with the Independent National Electoral Commission to contest in the election. APC candidate Abiodun Faleke won the election, defeating PDP Mutiu Olakunle and 17 other party candidates. Faleke received 51.92% of the votes, while Olakunle received 44.05%.

2019 Nigerian House of Representatives election in Lagos State
Party	Candidate	Votes	%
APC	Abiodun Faleke	25,195	51.92%
PDP	Mutiu Olakunle	21,373	44.05%
Others		1,955	4.03%
Total votes		48,523	100%
APC hold			

=== Ikorodu ===
A total of 11 candidates registered with the Independent National Electoral Commission to contest in the election. APC candidate Babajimi Benson won the election, defeating PDP Ramota Disu and 9 other party candidates. Benson received 67.23% of the votes, while Disu received 31.32%.

2019 Nigerian House of Representatives election in Lagos State
Party	Candidate	Votes	%
APC	Babajimi Benson	42,563	67.23%
PDP	Ramota Disu	19,825	31.32%
Others		919	1.45%
Total votes		63,307	100%
APC hold			

=== Kosofe ===
A total of 9 candidates registered with the Independent National Electoral Commission to contest in the election. APC candidate Oluwarotimi Agunsoye won the election, defeating PDP Sherifat Olushola-Hassan and 7 other party candidates. Agunsoye received 58.63% of the votes, while Olushola-Hassan received 39.59%.

2019 Nigerian House of Representatives election in Lagos State
Party	Candidate	Votes	%
APC	Oluwarotimi Agunsoye	41,593	58.63%
PDP	Sherifat Olushola-Hassan	28,087	39.59%
Others		1,266	1.78%
Total votes		70,946	100%
APC hold			

=== Lagos Island I ===
A total of 6 candidates registered with the Independent National Electoral Commission to contest in the election. APC candidate Enitan Badru won the election, defeating PDP Violet Olaitan Williams and 4 other party candidates. Badru received 81.48% of the votes, while Williams received 17.41%.

2019 Nigerian House of Representatives election in Lagos State
Party	Candidate	Votes	%
APC	Enitan Badru	15,245	81.48%
PDP	Violet Olaitan Williams	3,258	17.41%
Others		207	1.11%
Total votes		18,710	100%
APC hold			

=== Lagos Island II ===
A total of 4 candidates registered with the Independent National Electoral Commission to contest in the election. APC candidate Moshood Kayode Akiolu won the election, defeating PDP Adamoh-Faniyan Olagbenga and 2 other party candidates. Akiolu received 74.53% of the votes, while Olagbenga received 24.93%.

2019 Nigerian House of Representatives election in Lagos State
Party	Candidate	Votes	%
APC	Moshood Kayode Akiolu	12,988	74.53%
PDP	Adamoh-faniyan Olagbenga	4,345	24.93%
Others		94	0.54%
Total votes		17,427	100%
APC hold			

=== Lagos Mainland ===
A total of 9 candidates registered with the Independent National Electoral Commission to contest in the election. APC candidate Jimoh Abdul won the election, defeating PDP Tajudeen Jaiyeola Agoro and 7 other party candidates. Abdul received 56.06% of the votes, while Agoro received 42.76%.

2019 Nigerian House of Representatives election in Lagos State
Party	Candidate	Votes	%
APC	Jimoh Abdul	22,073	56.06%
PDP	Tajudeen Jaiyeola Agoro	16,834	42.76%
Others		466	1.18%
Total votes		39,373	100%
APC hold			

=== Mushin I ===
A total of 9 candidates registered with the Independent National Electoral Commission to contest in the election. APC candidate Adeyemi Taoveeq Alli won the election, defeating Accord Taoreed Akinsanya and 7 other party candidates. Alli received 58.00% of the votes, while Akinsanya received 27.58%.

2019 Nigerian House of Representatives election in Lagos State
Party	Candidate	Votes	%
APC	Adeyemi Taoveeq Alli	14,221	58.00%
A	Taoreed Akinsanya	6,763	27.58%
Others		3,534	14.41%
Total votes		24,518	100%
APC hold			

=== Mushin II ===
A total of 16 candidates registered with the Independent National Electoral Commission to contest in the election. APC candidate Bolaji Ayinla won the election, defeating PDP Jude Obiekwe and 14 other party candidates. Ayinla received 47.41% of the votes, while Obiekwe received 26.02%.

2019 Nigerian House of Representatives election in Lagos State
Party	Candidate	Votes	%
APC	Bolaji Ayinla	20,383	47.41%
PDP	Jude Obiekwe	11,185	26.02%
Others		11,425	26.57%
Total votes		42,993	100%
APC hold			

=== Ojo ===
The election for Ojo federal constituency was declared inconclusive due to collation of results allegedly being interrupted by accusation and counter-accusation by agents of the political parties. On the 10th of March 2019, INEC declared PDP's Tajudeen Obasa, winner of the election. A supplementary election was held at polling units in Okokomaiko, Ijanikin, Ilogbo and Ojo with Obasa polling 148 additional votes to defeat his closest rival, Durosinmi, who polled 259 votes. Obasa had earlier scored a total votes of 28,691 while APC candidate, Yinka Durosinmi scored 25,545 votes before the election was declared as inconclusive.

2019 Nigerian House of Representatives election in Lagos State
Party	Candidate	Votes	%
PDP	Tajudeen Obasa	28,839	52.78%
APC	Yinka Durosinmi	25,804	47.22%
Others			
Total votes		54,643	100%
PDP hold			

=== Oshodi/Isolo I ===
A total of 14 candidates registered with the Independent National Electoral Commission to contest in the election. APC candidate Bashiru Dawodu won the election, defeating PDP Mutiu Shadimu

and 12 other party candidates. Dawodu received 57.66% of the votes, while Shadimu received 40.66%.

2019 Nigerian House of Representatives election in Lagos State
Party	Candidate	Votes	%
APC	Bashiru Dawodu	14,353	57.66%
PDP	Mutiu Shadimu	10,121	40.66%
Others		419	1.68%
Total votes		24,893	100%
APC hold			

=== Oshodi/Isolo II ===
A total of 11 candidates registered with the Independent National Electoral Commission to contest in the election. APC candidate Ganiyu Johnson won the election, defeating PDP Emmanuel Nnodim and 9 other party candidates. Johnson received 54.07% of the votes, while Nnodim received 42.32%.

2019 Nigerian House of Representatives election in Lagos State
Party	Candidate	Votes	%
APC	Ganiyu Johnson	21,484	54.07%
PDP	Emmanuel Nnodim	16,817	42.32%
Others		1,436	3.61%
Total votes		39,737	100%
APC hold			

=== Somolu ===
A total of 10 candidates registered with the Independent National Electoral Commission to contest in the election. APC candidate Ademorin Kuye won the election, defeating PDP Oluwaseyi Olowu and 8 other party candidates. Kuye received 52.66% of the votes, while Olowu received 46.21%.

2019 Nigerian House of Representatives election in Lagos State
Party	Candidate	Votes	%
APC	Ademorin Kuye	28,722	52.66%
PDP	Oluwaseyi Olowu	25,202	46.21%
Others		615	1.13%
Total votes		54,539	100%
APC hold			

=== Surulere I ===
A total of 10 candidates registered with the Independent National Electoral Commission to contest in the election. APC candidate Femi Gbajabiamila won the election, defeating PDP Mike Adewara and 8 other party candidates. Gbajabiamila received 63.49% of the votes, while Adewara received 35.12%.

2019 Nigerian House of Representatives election in Lagos State
Party	Candidate	Votes	%
APC	Femi Gbajabiamila	14,617	63.49%
PDP	Mike Adewara	8,085	35.12%
Others		322	1.40%
Total votes		23,024	100%
APC hold			

=== Surulere II ===
A total of 9 candidates registered with the Independent National Electoral Commission to contest in the election. PDP candidate Olatunji Shoyinka won the election, defeating APC Lanre Okunlola and 7 other party candidates. Shoyinka received 49.83% of the votes, while Okunlola received 44.74%.

2019 Nigerian House of Representatives election in Lagos State
Party	Candidate	Votes	%
PDP	Olatunji Shoyinka	19,950	49.83%
APC	Lanre Okunlola	17,910	44.74%
Others		2,174	5.43%
Total votes		40,034	100%
PDP hold			
