= Ayinla (name) =

- Gender: Male
- Language: Yoruba

Origin
- Origin: Nigerian
- Meaning: A child meant to be praised, fêted, and disciplined
- Region of origin: South-west Nigeria.

Ayinla is a Nigerian masculine name and oríkì of Yoruba origin, meaning "A child meant to be praised, fêted, and disciplined." The gloss of the name combines à (someone), yìn (praise, fête), and lá (instruct, discipline), morphologically structured as "Àyìnlá".

Notable people with the name include:

== First name ==
- Ayinla Omowura (1933–1980), Nigerian Apala musician
- Ayinla Kollington (born 1949), Nigerian musician

== Surname ==
- Bolaji Ayinla (born 1960), Nigerian politician
- Fatai Ayinla (1939–2016), Nigerian amateur boxer
