= Ayinla =

Ayinla may refer to:

- Ayinla (film), 2021 Nigerian musical biopic

== People with the given name ==
- Ayinla Kollington (born 1953), Nigerian musician
- Ayinla Omowura (1933–1980), Nigerian Apala musician

== People with the surname ==
- Bolaji Ayinla (born 1960), Nigerian politician
- Fatai Ayinla (1939–2016), Nigerian amateur boxer
