= Ganiyu Johnson =

Nigerian politician

Ganiyu Abiodun Johnson

Member of the House of Representatives of Nigeria for Oshodi-Isolo II constituency
- In office 2019–2023
- Preceded by: Tony Nwulu
- Succeeded by: Jese Okey-Joe Onuakalusi

Personal details
- Party: All Progressives Congress (Nigeria) (APC)

Ganiyu Abiodun Johnson is a Nigerian politician and former member of the House of Representatives of Nigeria representing the Oshodi-Isolo II Federal Constituency in Lagos State.

Johnson was first elected into the Nigerian House of Representatives in 2019 to represent the Oshodi-Isolo II Federal Constituency in Lagos State but was defeated in 2023 to Jese Okey-Joe Onuakalusi of the Labour party.

He was Lagos state commissioner for works and infrastructure to Governor Akinwunm Ambode in 2015 before resigning to contest for the House of Representative seat in 2019.
