= Ogundipe Stephen Olukayode =

Nigerian politician

Hon. Ogundipe Stephen Olukayode

Member, Lagos State House of Assembly
- Incumbent
- Assumed office 2023
- Constituency: Oshodi-Isolo Constituency I

Personal details
- Born: June 9, 1964 (age 62) Lagos State, Nigeria
- Party: All Progressives Congress (APC)
- Education: University of Ibadan University of Lagos
- Occupation: Politician, Administrator, Businessman
- Website: Lagos Assembly Profile

Ogundipe Stephen Olukayode (born 9 June 1964) is a Nigerian politician, administrator, and businessman who currently serves as a member of the Lagos State House of Assembly, representing Oshodi-Isolo Constituency I under the platform of the All Progressives Congress (APC). He is the Chairman of the House Committee on Information, Strategy, and Security.

== Early life and education ==
Stephen Ogundipe was born on June 9, 1964. He began his education at All Saints Primary School, Yaba, and proceeded to Baptist Boys High School, Abeokuta, where he graduated in 1982. He obtained his A-Levels certificate from Abeokuta Grammar School in 1984 and an Advanced Diploma with distinction from Ogun State Polytechnic, Abeokuta, in 1986.

He attended the University of Ibadan, graduating with a Bachelor of Science (B.Sc.) degree in Psychology in 1989. He later obtained a Master's degree from the University of Lagos (UNILAG), where he is also a PhD research fellow.

== Career ==
=== Private sector ===
Ogundipe began his career in 1990 as an Administrative/Credit Manager at Kings Investment Company Nigeria Limited. Between 1991 and 1998, he worked at SCOA Nigeria PLC, rising to the position of Group Personnel Manager. He later joined Kewalram/Afrint PLC as the Group Human Resources Manager.

=== Political career ===
Ogundipe's political involvement dates back to the Third Republic, where he led a youth political group called "New Generation." In 2002, he was appointed by then-Governor Bola Tinubu as the Executive Secretary and Chairman of Agege Local Government. He has served as the Chairman of the Conference of Former Executive Secretaries in Lagos State since 2009.

In the 2023 general elections, he contested and won the seat to represent Oshodi-Isolo Constituency I in the Lagos State House of Assembly. Upon his inauguration into the 10th Assembly, he was appointed as the Chairman of the House Committee on Information, Strategy, and Security.
