= 2015 Oyo State House of Assembly election =

The 2015 Oyo State House of Assembly election was held on April 1, 2015, to elect members of the Oyo State House of Assembly in Nigeria. All the 32 seats were up for election in the Oyo State House of Assembly.

== Results ==
=== Akinyele I ===
A candidate Oyebamiji Joshua won the election.

2015 Oyo State House of Assembly election
| Party | Candidate | Votes | % |
|---|---|---|---|
| A | Oyebamiji Joshua | | |
| A hold | | | |

=== Ibadan North West ===
APC candidate Oladipo Abimbola won the election.

2015 Oyo State House of Assembly election
| Party | Candidate | Votes | % |
|---|---|---|---|
| APC | Oladipo Abimbola | | |
| APC hold | | | |

=== Akinyele II ===
APC candidate Badmus Saheed won the election.

2015 Oyo State House of Assembly election
| Party | Candidate | Votes | % |
|---|---|---|---|
| APC | Badmus Saheed | | |
| APC hold | | | |

=== Saki West ===
APC candidate Musa Wasi won the election.

2015 Oyo State House of Assembly election
| Party | Candidate | Votes | % |
|---|---|---|---|
| APC | Musa Wasi | | |
| APC hold | | | |

=== Afijio ===
APC candidate Oyatokun Oyeleke Adeyemi won the election.

2015 Oyo State House of Assembly election
| Party | Candidate | Votes | % |
|---|---|---|---|
| APC | Oyatokun Oyeleke Adeyemi | | |
| APC hold | | | |

=== Lagelu ===
APC candidate Akinmoyede Olafioye won the election.

2015 Oyo State House of Assembly election
| Party | Candidate | Votes | % |
|---|---|---|---|
| APC | Akinmoyede Olafioye | | |
| APC hold | | | |

=== Iwajowa ===
APC candidate Okunlola Adelere won the election.

2015 Oyo State House of Assembly election
| Party | Candidate | Votes | % |
|---|---|---|---|
| APC | Okunlola Adelere | | |
| APC hold | | | |

=== Kajola ===
APC candidate Olalere Adebayo won the election.

2015 Oyo State House of Assembly election
| Party | Candidate | Votes | % |
|---|---|---|---|
| APC | Olalere Adebayo | | |
| APC hold | | | |

=== Iseyin/Itesiwaju ===
APC candidate Afeez Adeleke won the election.

2015 Oyo State House of Assembly election
| Party | Candidate | Votes | % |
|---|---|---|---|
| APC | Afeez Adeleke | | |
| APC hold | | | |

=== Irepo/Olorunsogo ===
APC candidate Oseni Ganiyu won the election.

2015 Oyo State House of Assembly election
| Party | Candidate | Votes | % |
|---|---|---|---|
| APC | Oseni Ganiyu | | |
| APC hold | | | |

=== Oorelope ===
LP candidate Aremu Tunji won the election.

2015 Oyo State House of Assembly election
| Party | Candidate | Votes | % |
|---|---|---|---|
| LP | Aremu Tunji | | |
| LP hold | | | |

=== Atisbo/Saki East ===
APC candidate Sangodipe Michael won the election.

2015 Oyo State House of Assembly election
| Party | Candidate | Votes | % |
|---|---|---|---|
| APC | Sangodipe Michael | | |
| APC hold | | | |

=== Egbeda ===
A candidate Oguntade Olasunkanmi won the election.

2015 Oyo State House of Assembly election
| Party | Candidate | Votes | % |
|---|---|---|---|
| A | Oguntade Olasunkanmi | | |
| A hold | | | |

=== Ogo Oluwa/Surulere ===
LP candidate Oyetunji Olusegun won the election.

2015 Oyo State House of Assembly election
| Party | Candidate | Votes | % |
|---|---|---|---|
| LP | Oyetunji Olusegun | | |
| LP hold | | | |

=== Ido ===
APC candidate Olalere Adekunle won the election.

2015 Oyo State House of Assembly election
| Party | Candidate | Votes | % |
|---|---|---|---|
| APC | Olalere Adekunle | | |
| APC hold | | | |

=== Ibarapa East ===
APC candidate Michael Adeyemo won the election.

2015 Oyo State House of Assembly election
| Party | Candidate | Votes | % |
|---|---|---|---|
| APC | Michael Adeyemo | | |
| APC hold | | | |

=== Ibadan South East II ===
A candidate Hakeem Ige won the election.

2015 Oyo State House of Assembly election
| Party | Candidate | Votes | % |
|---|---|---|---|
| A | Hakeem Ige | | |
| A hold | | | |

=== Ibadan South East I ===
A candidate Adesina Fatai won the election.

2015 Oyo State House of Assembly election
| Party | Candidate | Votes | % |
|---|---|---|---|
| A | Adesina Fatai | | |
| A hold | | | |

=== Ibarapa Central/Ibarapa North ===
APC candidate Jimoh Akintunde won the election.

2015 Oyo State House of Assembly election
| Party | Candidate | Votes | % |
|---|---|---|---|
| APC | Jimoh Akintunde | | |
| APC hold | | | |

=== Ibadan South West II ===
APC candidate Ajanaku Olusegun won the election.

2015 Oyo State House of Assembly election
| Party | Candidate | Votes | % |
|---|---|---|---|
| APC | Ajanaku Olusegun | | |
| APC hold | | | |

=== Ibadan South West I ===
APC candidate Subair Hassan won the election.

2015 Oyo State House of Assembly election
| Party | Candidate | Votes | % |
|---|---|---|---|
| APC | Subair Hassan | | |
| APC hold | | | |

=== Ogbomoso South ===
LP candidate Akande Solomon won the election.

2015 Oyo State House of Assembly election
| Party | Candidate | Votes | % |
|---|---|---|---|
| LP | Akande Solomon | | |
| LP hold | | | |

=== Ogbomoso North ===
LP candidate Oladeji Olawumi won the election.

2015 Oyo State House of Assembly election
| Party | Candidate | Votes | % |
|---|---|---|---|
| LP | Oladeji Olawumi | | |
| LP hold | | | |

=== Oluyole ===
APC candidate Wahab Abiodun won the election.

2015 Oyo State House of Assembly election
| Party | Candidate | Votes | % |
|---|---|---|---|
| APC | Wahab Abiodun | | |
| APC hold | | | |

=== Ibadan North II ===
APC candidate Olaleye Olaniyi won the election.

2015 Oyo State House of Assembly election
| Party | Candidate | Votes | % |
|---|---|---|---|
| APC | Olaleye Olaniyi | | |
| APC hold | | | |

=== Ibadan North I ===
APC candidate Agbaje Olufunke won the election.

2015 Oyo State House of Assembly election
| Party | Candidate | Votes | % |
|---|---|---|---|
| APC | Agbaje Olufunke | | |
| APC hold | | | |

=== Oyo East/Oyo West ===
A candidate Olagunju Olalekan won the election.

2015 Oyo State House of Assembly election
| Party | Candidate | Votes | % |
|---|---|---|---|
| A | Olagunju Olalekan | | |
| A hold | | | |

=== Ona Ara ===
A candidate Azeez Adesina won the election.

2015 Oyo State House of Assembly election
| Party | Candidate | Votes | % |
|---|---|---|---|
| A | Azeez Adesina | | |
| A hold | | | |

=== Ibadan North East II ===
A candidate Adeoye Adeniyi won the election.

2015 Oyo State House of Assembly election
| Party | Candidate | Votes | % |
|---|---|---|---|
| A | Adeoye Adeniyi | | |
| A hold | | | |

=== Ibadan North East I ===
A candidate Oloya Ayinla won the election.

2015 Oyo State House of Assembly election
| Party | Candidate | Votes | % |
|---|---|---|---|
| A | Oloya Ayinla | | |
| A hold | | | |

=== Atiba ===
LP candidate Oyekola Joseph won the election.

2015 Oyo State House of Assembly election
| Party | Candidate | Votes | % |
|---|---|---|---|
| LP | Oyekola Joseph | | |
| LP hold | | | |

=== Oriire ===
LP candidate Ojo Olagunju won the election.

2015 Oyo State House of Assembly election
| Party | Candidate | Votes | % |
|---|---|---|---|
| LP | Ojo Olagunju | | |
| LP hold | | | |
