= Ekinrin-Adde =

Town in Kogi State, Nigeria

Coordinates: 7°50′00″N 5°52′06″E

Ekinrin-Adde is a town located in Ijumu L.G.A. of Kogi State, in the Western Senatorial District of Nigeria on latitude 7° 50’N and longitude 5° 50’E at an altitude of 523 metres above sea level. The town is a conglomerate of contiguous villages that amalgamated into one. The people trace their ancestry to Ile-Ife, the cradle of Yoruba civilization. The people are a sub-ethnic group within the Yoruba nationality, who speak a dialect generally referred to as Okun, widely spoken by the five local Government that make up the Kogi West Senatorial District although with slight variation from community to community. The Okun dialect is a sub-dialect of the Yoruba language.

== History ==
Ekinrin-Adde was very important in the economic activities of Okun land during the pre-colonial era. There existed some economic activities such as hunting, fishing, agriculture, trade and commerce.

== Location ==
Ekinrin-Adde is located in Ijumu Local Government Area of Kogi state and bordered by Iyamoye and Egbeda Egga. Ekinrin-Adde is 20 minutes drive from Ekiti state and shares other cultures with villages on the same axis.

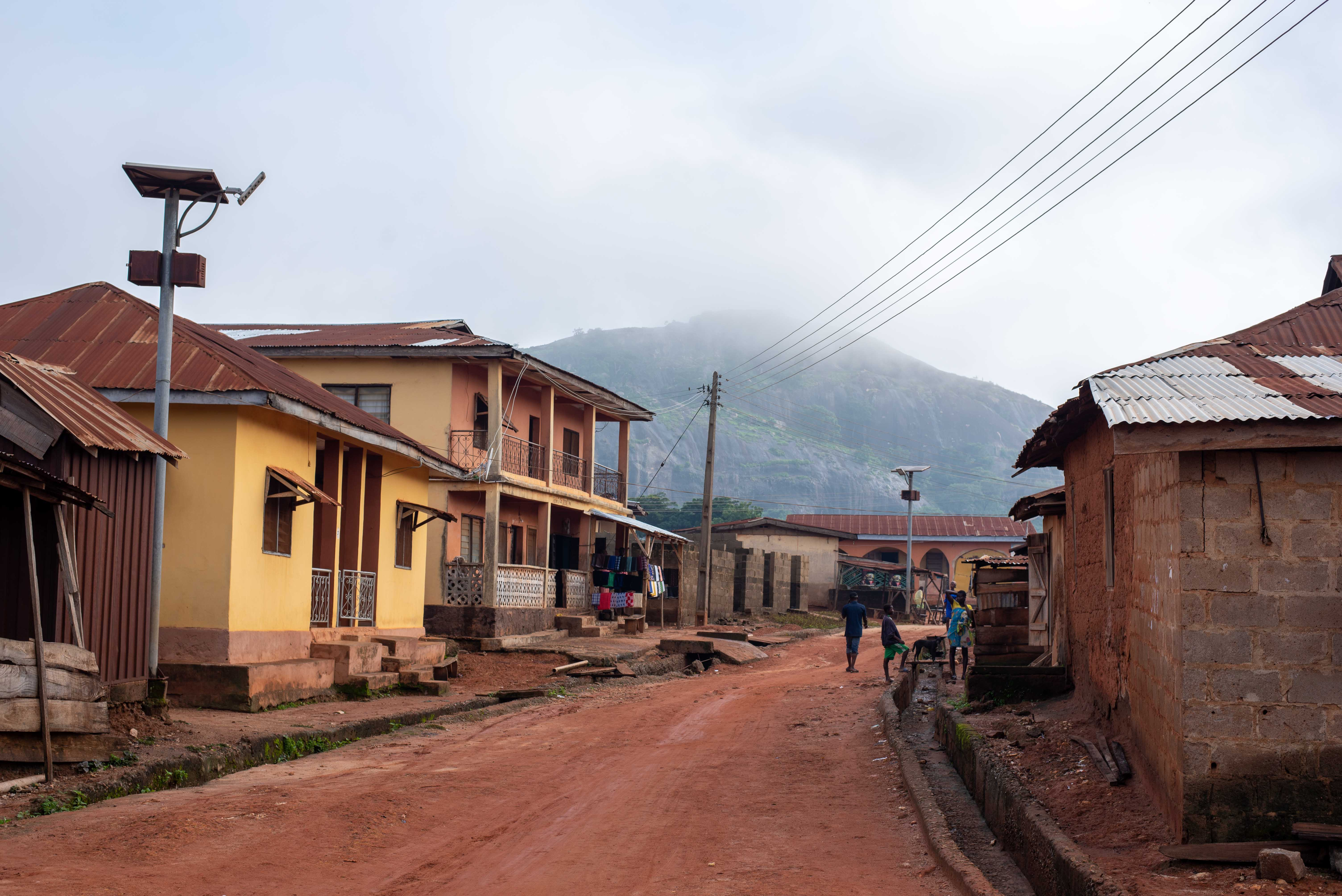
Akogba Mountain from the community on a cloudy morning

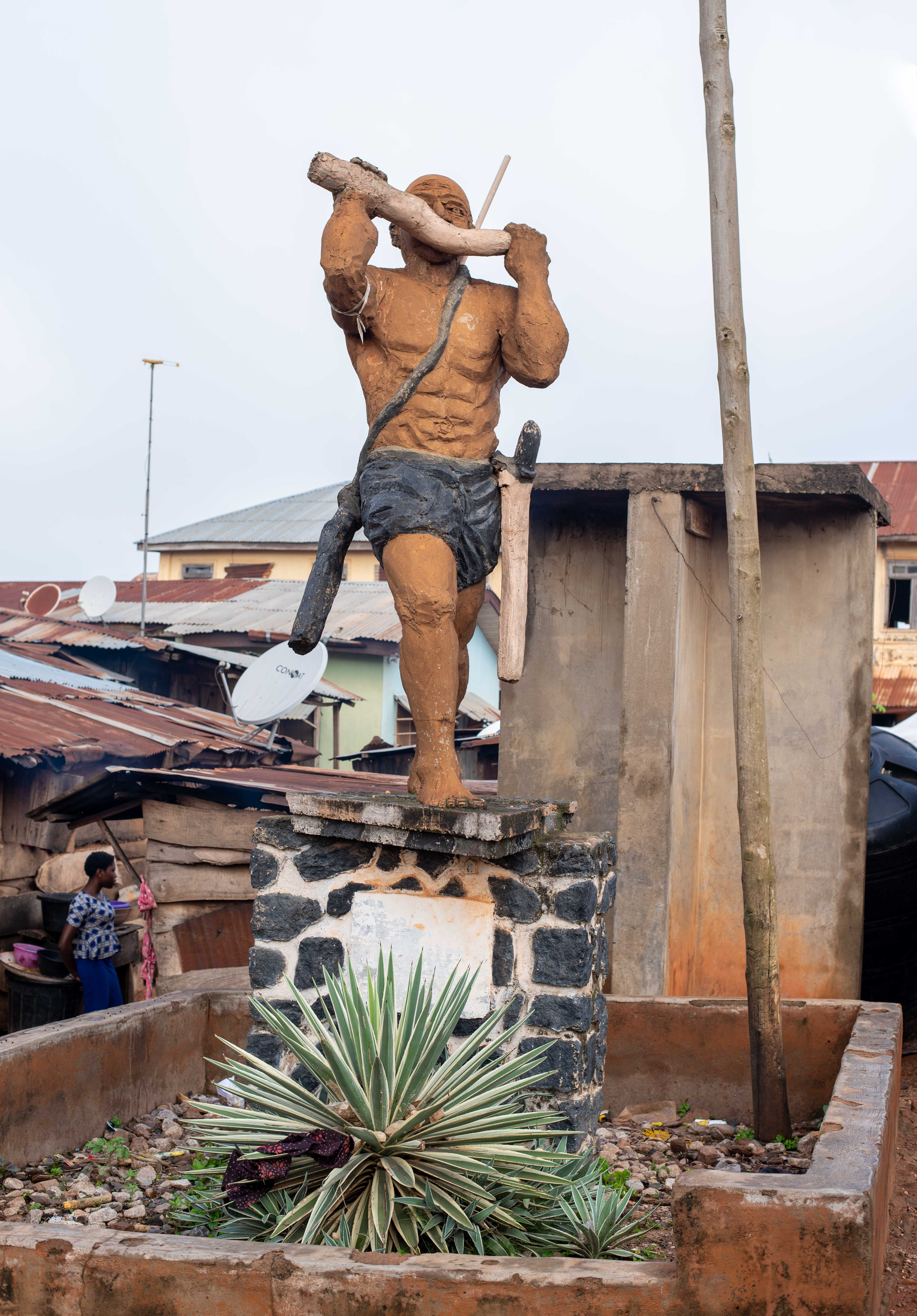
Statue next to community well

== Culture ==
The Ekinrin-Adde people are united by several practices such as Egungun (masquerade) festival. Masquerades usually parade during a particular season and also when an eminent person who holds or who is in a position of authority dies. Notable masquerades includes the Olori Owo or Iro masquerades (women are forbidden from seeing them) and it belongs to the Ekinrin aboriginals. Iro masquerade is as old as Ekinrin itself as it was created by Akinrin himself. There is also Oyoyo (comes out during the Emindin festival) and the Ajibele, Ajoriga masquerade. Other masquerades includes Onigabon, Inun Oko and Okura (Okura appear to have gone into extinction).

Another cultural festival usually carried out on the 20th day of June every year is the Emindin festival. The “Emindin” festival is usually called out by the Omo Agba people from Ona the royal clan.

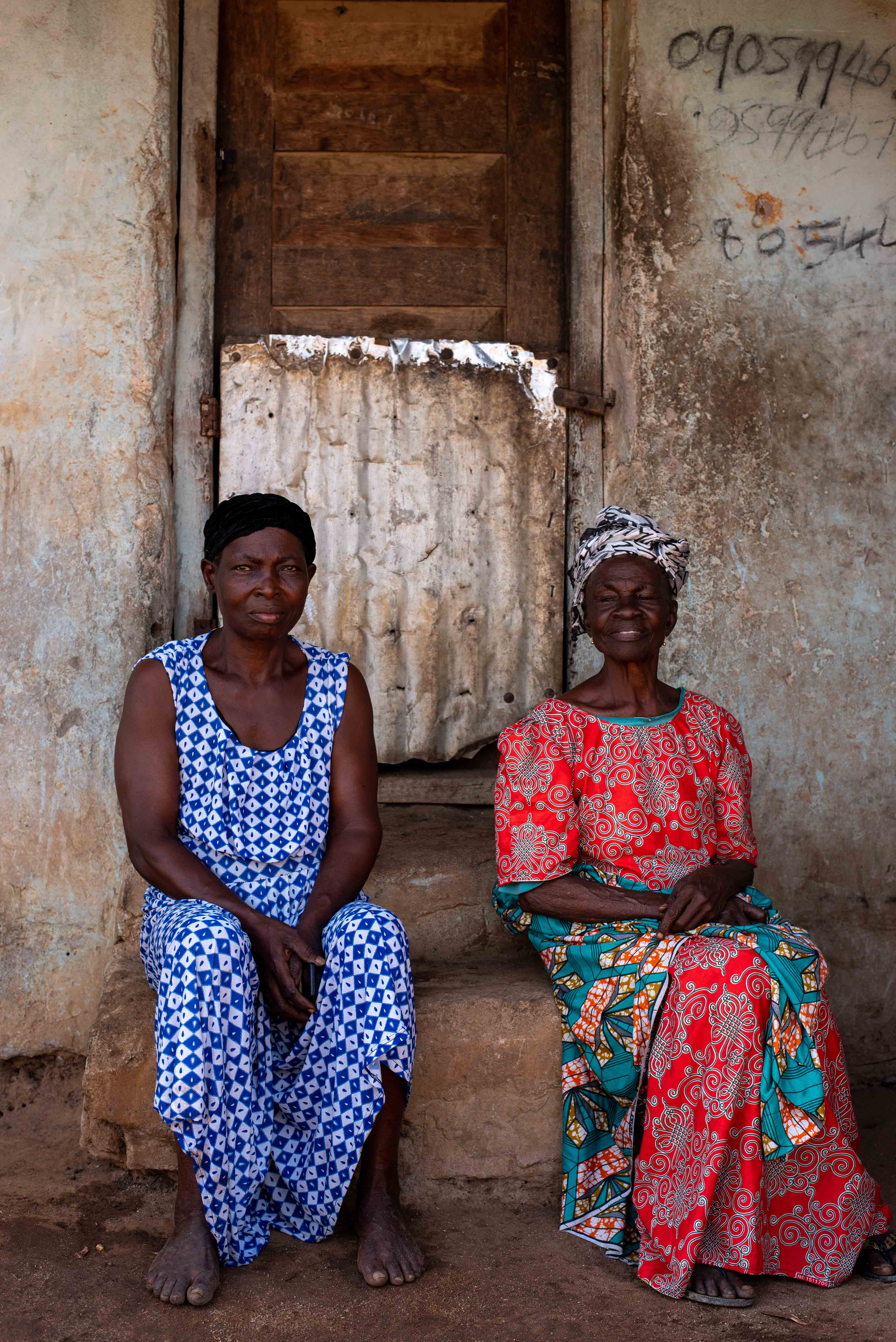
Elderly women at Ekinrin-Adde

== Geography ==
The general nature of Ekinrin-Adde land is predominantly Savannah with undulating plains. There are deep hills, which marks the eastern and western edge. The soil is light brown, sandy and a little lateritic on the plain stony soil in the hills with rare patches of red earth. Due to the nature of the soil, most of the residents are farmers and common farm produce include yam, cassava, pepper, beans, cocoyam, melon and palm oil.

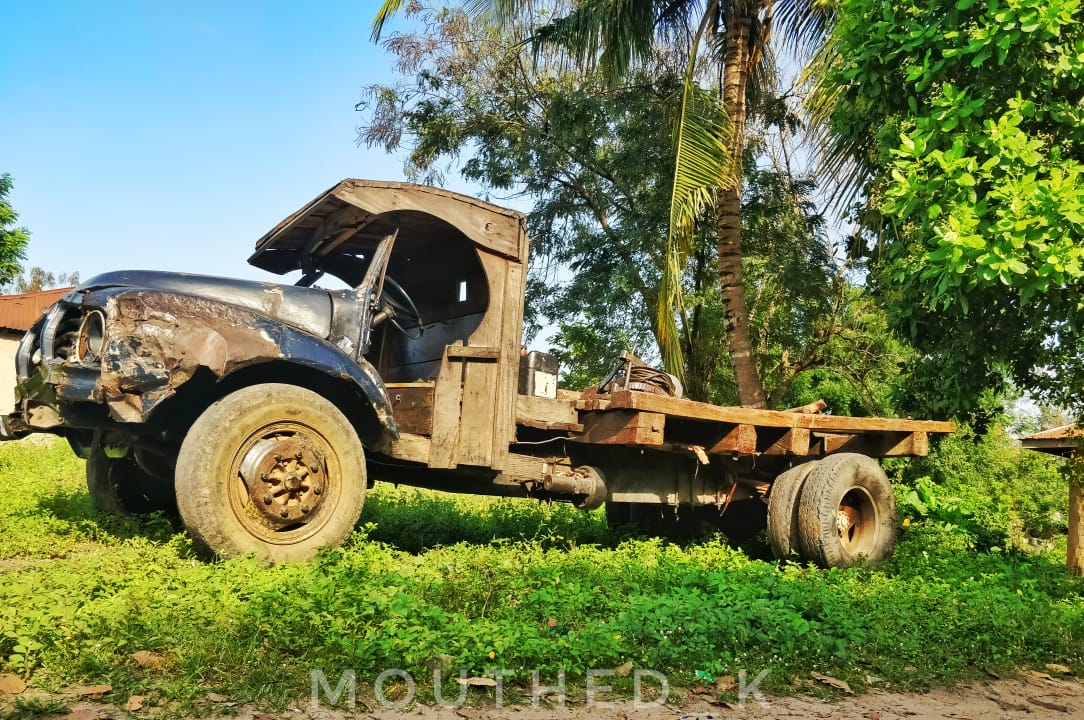
Agbegi-Lodo(Old Bedford Trucks common in Ekinrin-Adde used for wood lumbering)

== Natural resources and tourist attraction ==
Ekinrin-Adde is very rich in white marble. The marble deposit in Ekinrin-Adde, based on its chemical composition is a pure carbonate and a typical calcitic-type marble. The marble deposit in Ekinrin-Adde is suitable for the manufacture of cement, production of sodium alkalis (sodium carbonate, bicarbonate and hydroxide), pesticide, poultry feed, calcium ammonium nitrate fertilizer and as a refractory lime.

Notable tourist spots include the Akogba hill (1000m above sea level) and Oyi river.

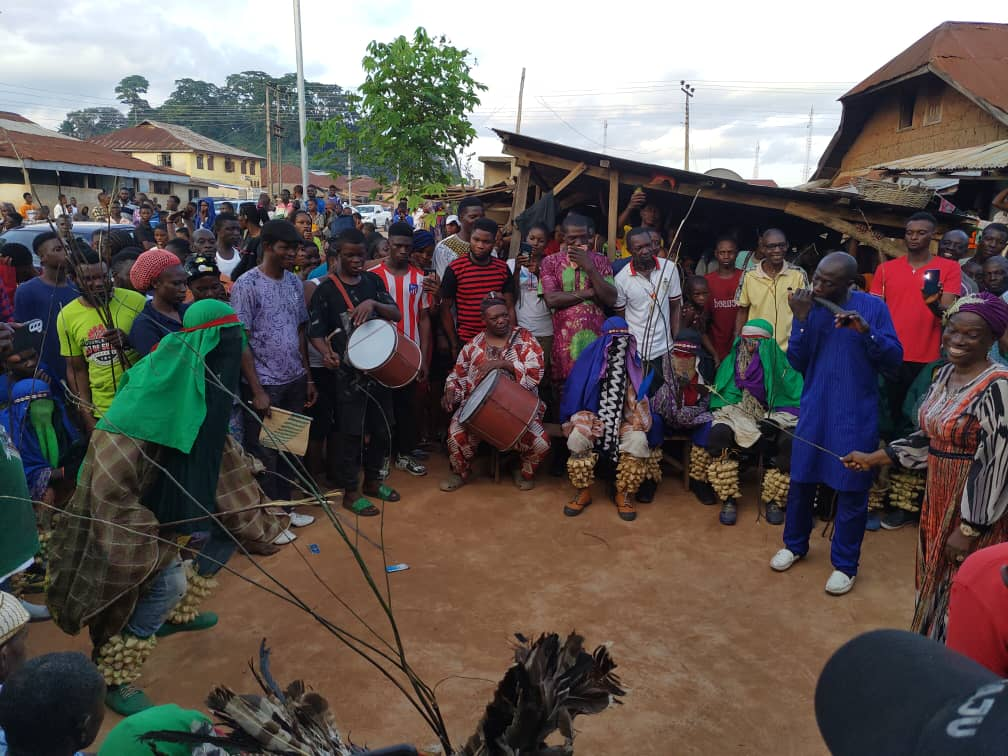
Ajibele Masquerade of Ekinrin-Adde

The Akogba radio FM (88.3) residing near the Akogba Hill, is the first private community FM in Okun and serves the purpose of ensuring the people of Ijumu, parts of Kabba Bunu and even neighbouring states are well informed about happenings in Kogi, Nigeria and the world at large.

== Eulogy ==
Emidin Festival is the annual new yam festival of the Ekinrin people. Emidin festival is usually celebrated in June. In the very old days, barns of yams shows the wealth of a person, someone with a large collection of yams marked prestige. From planting till harvest, the process of farming yam is taken sacred by the Ekinrin-Adde's culture. Around June, the first yams are harvested and celebrated by the people. Men would dig up their first yams for display and the farmers with the biggest yams are often admired. After the celebration, the yams are cooked or roasted with the women guiding the procession.

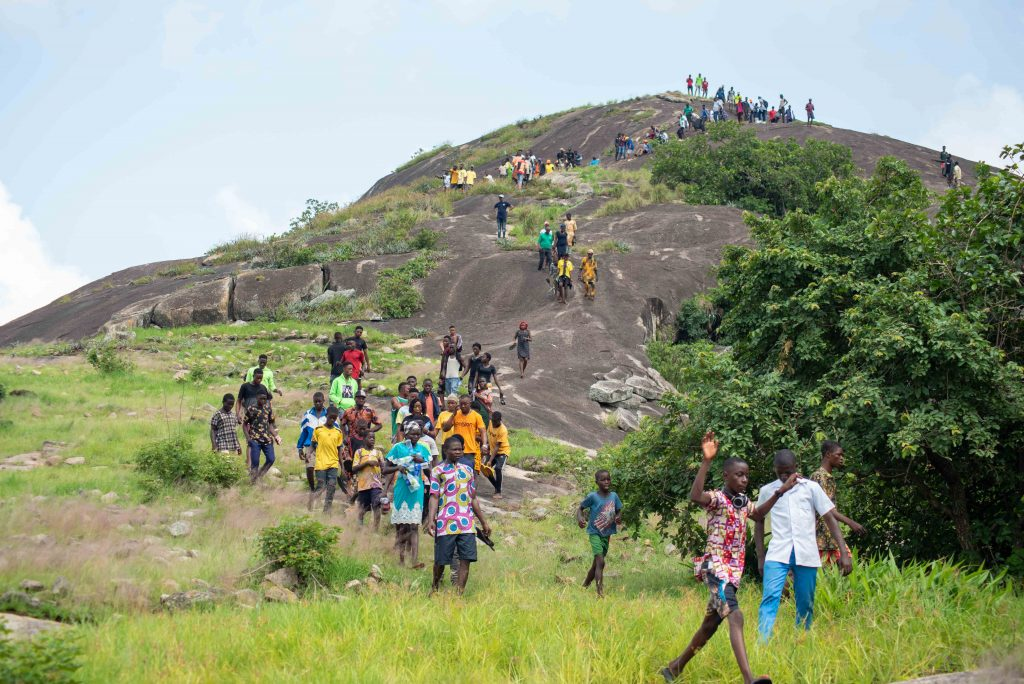
Akogba Hiking Festival

This festival also serves as a period to thank the gods for a bountiful harvest and also to ask for abundant rains for the next planting season. It's a common practice for most indigenes of the town to return home to celebrate, meet their family members and also an age group reunion opportunity. According to tradition, it is unacceptable for the community member to eat new yam before the celebration.

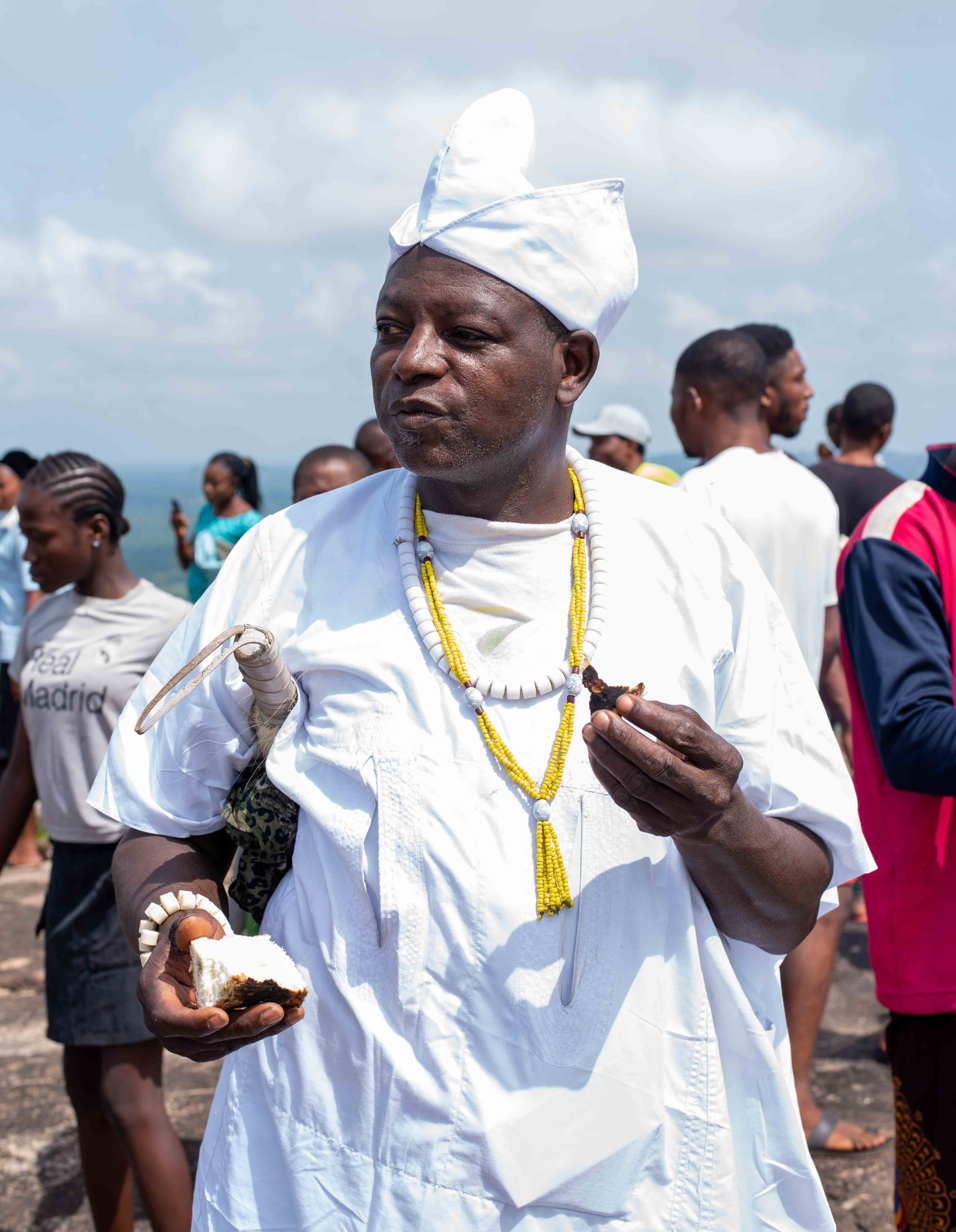
Chief at new yam festival

Other festivals are Idi Festival, Okẹlẹkẹlẹ festival and a new festival for hiking on the Akogba Mountain, reportedly one of the most natural endowments of Ekinrin-Adde which overlooks the town, as well as being the source of the Akogba Spring.

== Education ==
Ekinrin-Adde has various primary and secondary schools. Most of the old ones were established through communal efforts and by collaboration with early missionaries. Among the very notable ones is Baptist High School, established by the community in conjunction with the missionary John B. Hill.

== Kings and traditional rulers ==
Ekinrin-Adde is the only community in the entire Kogi state with two first class Kings serving the community.

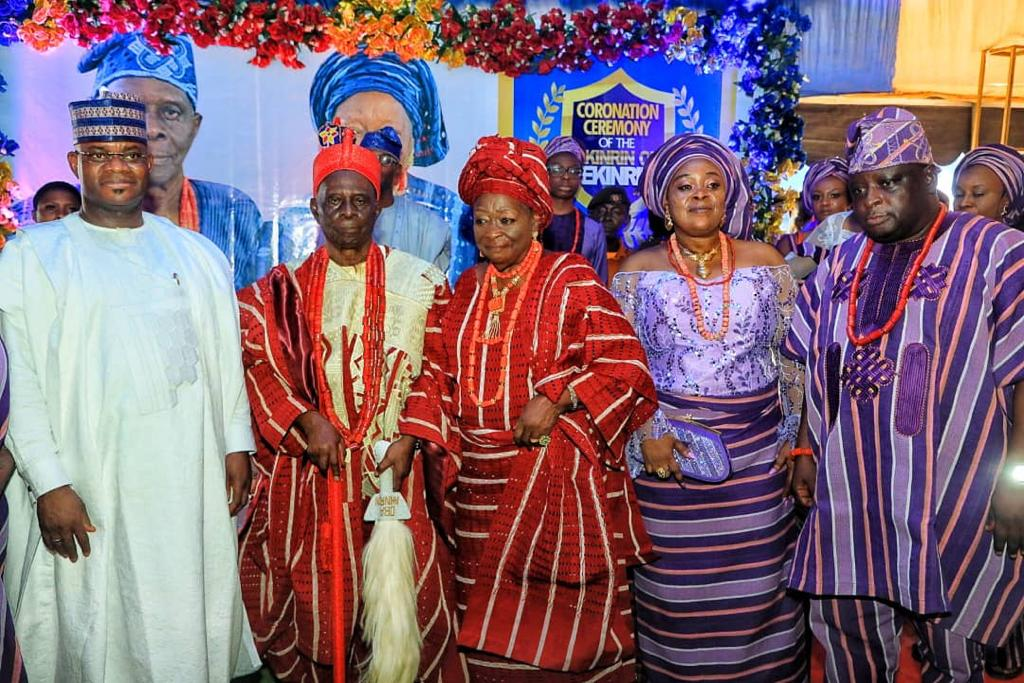
HRH Akinrin Johnson Kolade Otitoju during his coronation. The occasion was graced with the presence of the Governor of Kogi State, His Excellency-Governor Yahaya Bello

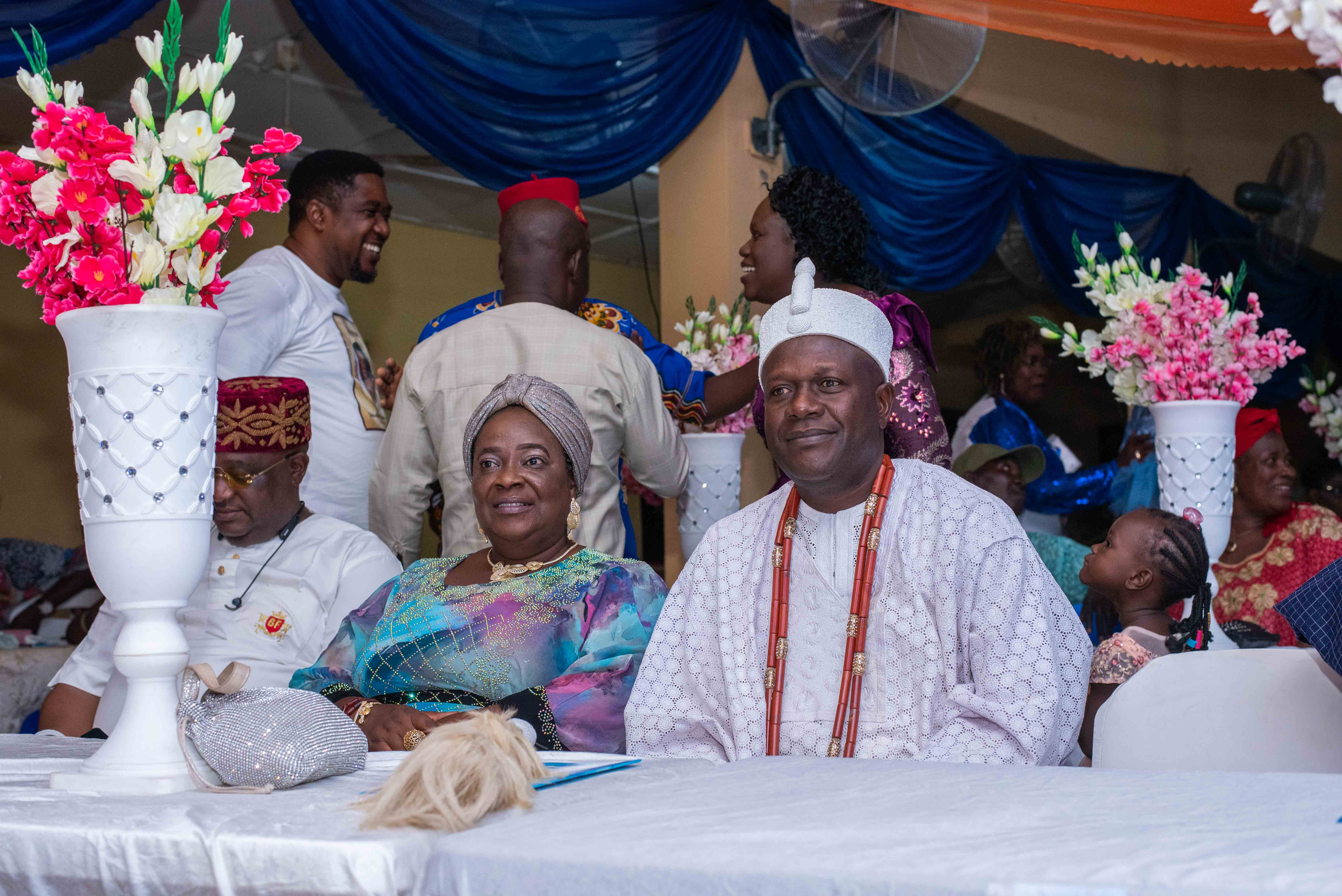
HRH Oba Anthony Bamigbaiye Idowu and Olori Bridget Fehintola Idowu at Hall of Fame/Gala Night, 2021

== Notable people ==
- Abiodun Faleke - Politician and a member of Nigeria's House of Representatives of Lagos
- Olayemi Akinwunmi - Vice Chancellor, Federal University, Lokoja
