= Not Too Young To Run =

Act of the National Assembly of Nigeria

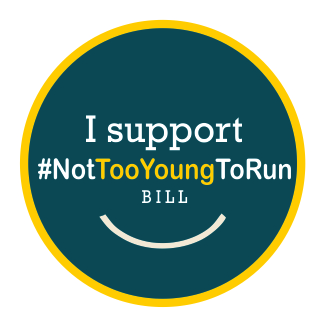
- Formation: 2016
- Type: Youth Political Advocacy
- Location: Nigeria, Gambia
- Key people: Samson Itodo, Tony Nwulu (co-founders, spokesperson)
- Website: www.nottooyoungtorun.org

Not Too Young To Run is a constitutional amendment bill passed by the Nigerian legislature, which reduced the age limit of running for elective offices in Nigeria. The campaign started in support of bills and motions in Nigeria's National Assembly sponsored by the Tony Nwulu in the House of Representatives and AbdulAziz Nyako in the Senate. The campaign is now global, symbolized by the hashtag #NotTooYoungToRun. The bill was assented into law by president Muhammad Buhari on the 31st of a may 2018.

== History of Not Too Young To Run bill ==
The Age Reduction Bill, popularly known as Not Too Young To Run bill was conceived and began to be pushed by several civil society groups, including YIAGA Africa, beginning in May 2016. The group is headed by Samson Itodo, a human right activist and a good governance campaigner. The bill was sponsored in the House of Representatives by Tony Nwulu and in the Senate by AbdulAziz Nyako. The bill seeks alteration in sections 65, 106, 131, 177 of the Constitution of Nigeria, which has reduced the age of running for elective positions for the house of Assembly and House of Representatives from 30 years old to 25 years old, Senate and Governorship from 35 year old to 30-year-old and office of the president from 40 to 30 and independent candidature in Nigeria.

== Advocacies ==
On 20 April 2018, the promoters of the bill had a meeting with the Vice President, Yemi Osinbajo to advocate for the Presidency to assent to the bill. After approval, the movement sought the All Progressives Congress for reduction in the nomination form fee, as it was N55 million before it was reduced to N45 million. But the movement want the fee to be reduced to encourage involvement of youths in politics. Earlier, about six political party had pledged incentives for the Not-Too-Young-To-Run movement to encourage participation of young Nigerians in politics.

== Passage of Not Too Young To Run bill at Nigeria Parliaments ==
The bill was first read at the House of Representatives and was passed with votes of (86-10) in the Senate on 26 July 2017, and 261-23 in the House of Representatives, on 27 July 2017. The bill passed first and second readings in Nigerian Parliament and was presented to Committee on Constitutional Review.

For any constitutional amendment to become a law in Nigeria, the amendment also needs to be presented to the House of Assembly of the 36 states of the federation, and not less than 24 states (two-third) are expected to vote Yes to the amendment. It was reported that the House of Assembly in 33 Nigerian states voted Yes, except Zamfara, Lagos and Kano.

The bill was rejected by Taraba State Assembly initially, but, was reversed after the group made a press release inaugurating the Taraba House of Assembly into the Hall of Shame. On 16 February 2018, the conveners gave the Nigerian Parliaments and their president 30days ultimatum to conclude the processes of passage and signing of the bill into law.

=== Assent to Not Too Young To Run bill by Nigeria's President ===
In April 2018, the Nigerian Senate resolved to transmit the Not Too Young To Run bill to the President of Nigeria. On 21 May 2018, 55 youth-led organizations gave President Buhari an 8-day ultimatum to assent to the bill. On 29 May 2018, the Nigerian President, Muhammadu Buhari, announced in his 'democracy day' national address that he planned to sign the bill into law. He subsequently signed the bill on 31 May 2018. On 31 May 2018, Muhammadu Buhari signed the Not Too Young To Run bill into law.

== Constitutional Changes After The Adoption of NotTooYoungToRun Bill ==
Since the inception of the NotTooYoungToRun Bill, there has been major amendment on Elective office age limit,Presendency from 40 Years to 35 years, Governorship from 35 Years to 30 Years , Senator 30 Years to 25Years, House of Representatives 25 to 20 years .

== Limitations Of NotTooYoungToRun Bill ==
The constitutional amendment, despite changing the age barrier, it still did not give chance for the obstacles to be evacuated. This is the reason why despite the presence of a 35-year-old presidential candidate on the ballot paper, it cannot independently be taken as evidence of generational change.

== Political Controversy ==
There was a controversy that the Not Too Young To Run bill was removed from the constitutional review report during the Nigerian constitutional review meeting.
