= Akogba =

Hills in Kogi State, Nigeria

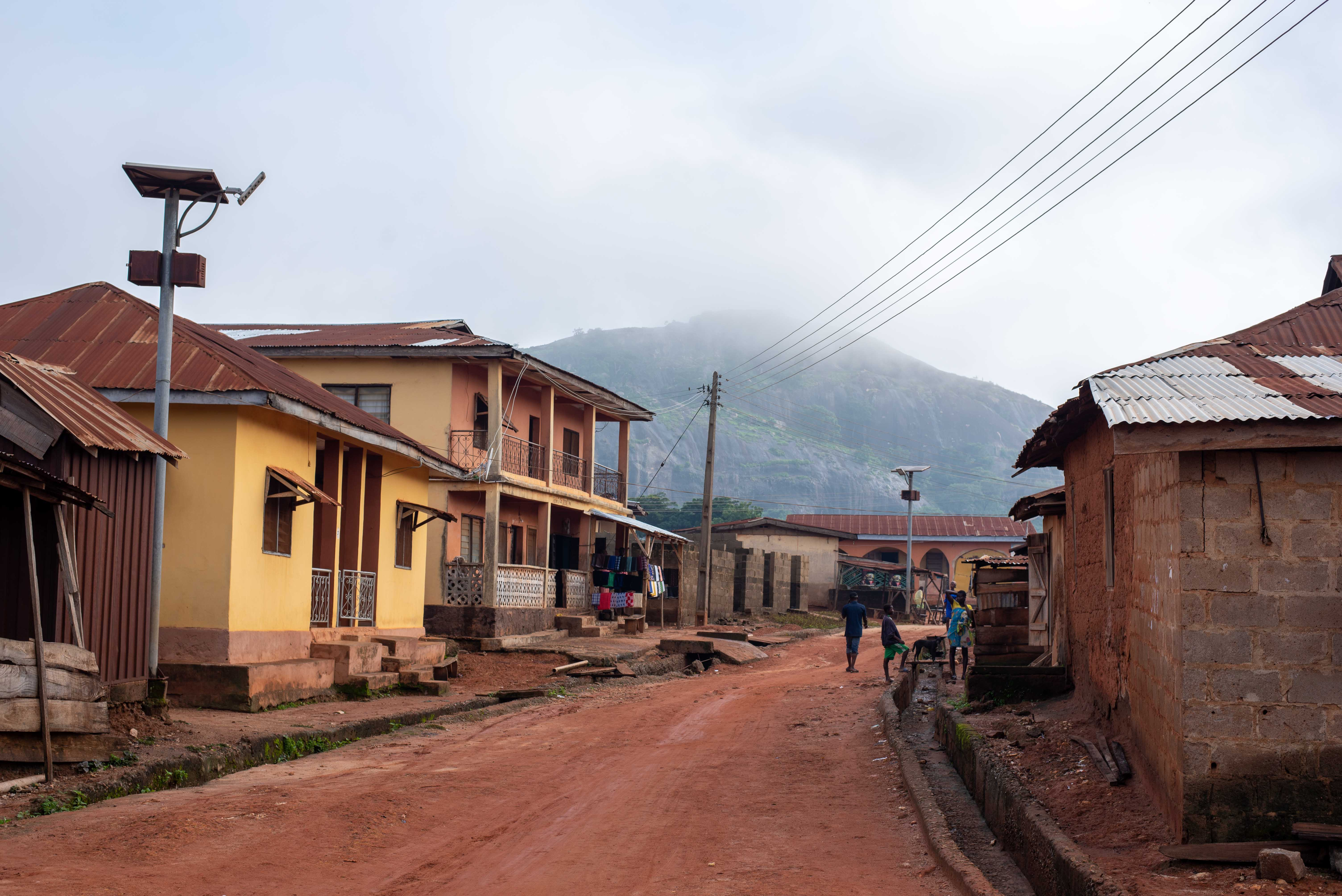
Akogba hill

The Akogba Hill, or Oke Akogba, is a hill located in Ekinrin-Adde in Kogi State of Northcentral Nigeria.

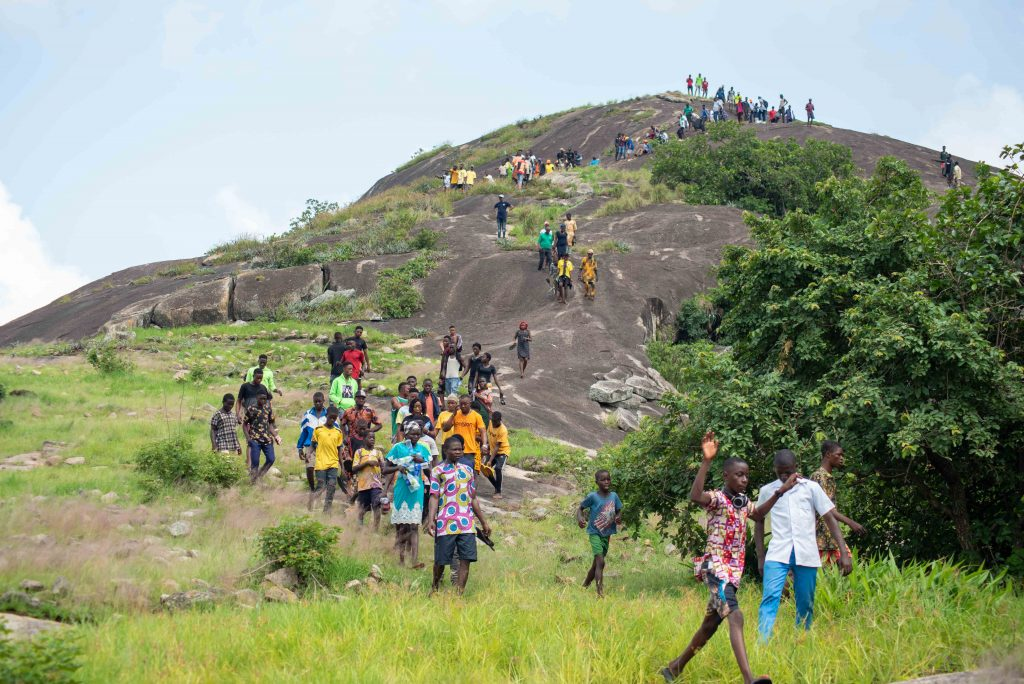
Akogba Hill Hiking

The hill, also known as Oke Akogba or Or'Oke Akogba, is one of the natural endowments of Ekinrin-Adde. It is a large monolith in the north-west of the Ekinrin-Adde community overlooking the town as well as being the source of the Akogba Spring. Although it is not the only mountain surrounding the community, it is arguably the most prominent at an altitude of about 1,050 m (1,150 yd; 3,440 ft) above sea level. This intrusion of Ekinrin-Adde’s landscape is among a chain of other mountains to the north of Ekinrin-Adde among which are Oroke Kere, Oroke Asi Oroke Kongo and Oroke Ewuta.

== Geology ==
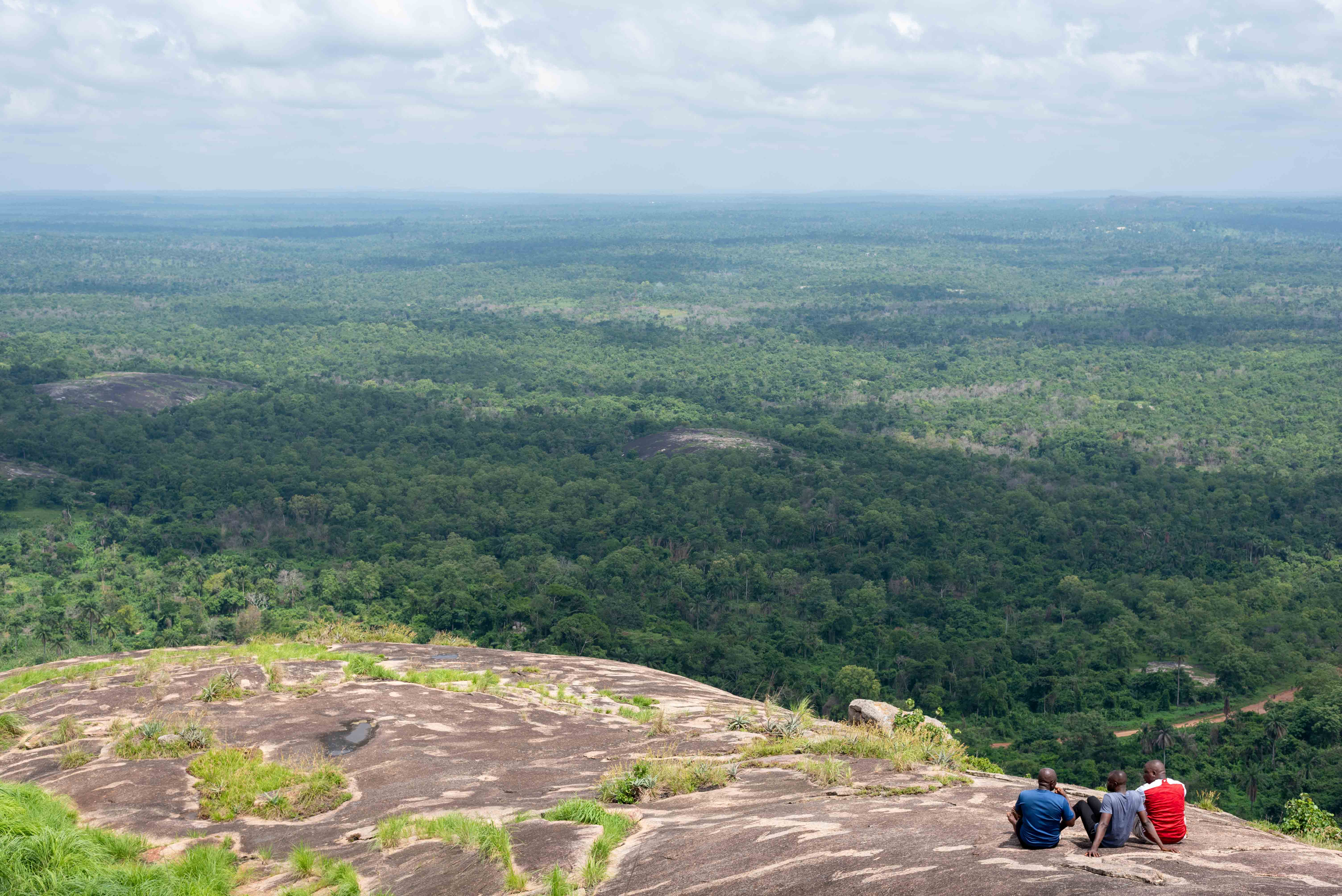
View from Akogba Hill

It is a massive out crop of granite rocks of primitive formation that contains caves which offered protection to the people in the days of intertribal wars. It is from this mountain that Akogba spring took it source. Hence, to the Ekinrin-Adde, the Akogba mountain stands not only as one of the physical geographical phenomenon that dotted the landscape, but also as a monument of faith in unity, strength and unfailing protection and sustenance from the supreme being.

== Festival ==
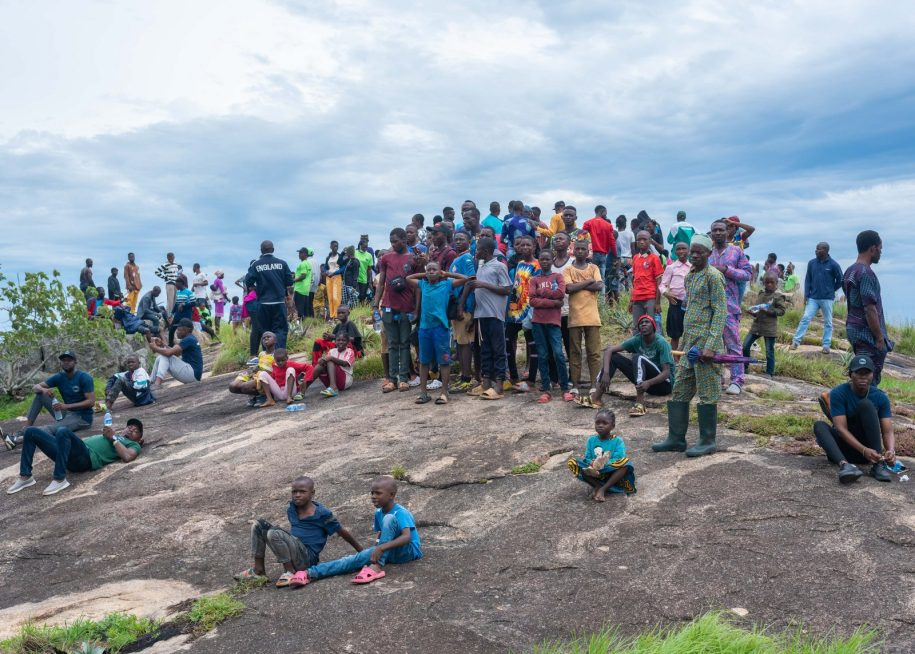
Hikers for the 2021 Maiden Edition, AkogbaHills, Ekinrin-Adde

Annually in June, which marks the beginning of the year for the Okun people's calendar, thousands of indigene and visitors gather in thousands to hike the Akogba Mountain. Dayo Babalola (a UK based indigene of the Ekinrin-Adde) after due consultation with all stakeholders and like minds. The Akogba Hiking festival and Carnival is one of the biggest hiking event in Kogi state. The hike is an opportunity to explore this nature endowment and showcase the distinguishing characteristics of the diverse landscapes, culture, tradition, and history of Ekinrin-Adde people.
