= Moses Fayinka =

Nigerian politician

Moses Oluwatoyin Fayinka

Member of the House of Representatives of Nigeria for Mushin II constituency
- In office 2023–2027
- Preceded by: Bolaji Ayinla

Personal details
- Party: All Progressives Congress (Nigeria) (APC)

Moses Oluwatoyin Fayinka is a Nigerian politician and member of the House of Representatives of Nigeria representing the Mushin IIFederal Constituency in Lagos State.

Fayinka was first elected into the Nigerian House of Representatives in 2023 to represent the Mushin II Federal Constituency in Lagos State after gathering 29,502 votes to win his closest rival Adeyemi Michael Olamide of the People's Democratic Party who had 12,355 votes and was previously the special advisor to the Lagos state governor of Transportation.
