= Jese Okey-Joe Onuakalusi =

Nigerian politician

Member of the House of Representatives of Nigeria for Mushin II constituency
- Incumbent
- Assumed office 2023
- Preceded by: Ganiyu Johnson

Personal details
- Party: Labour Party (Nigeria) (LP)

Jese Okey-Joe Onuakalusi is a Nigerian politician, lawyer and member of the House of Representatives of Nigeria representing Oshodi-Isolo I Federal Constituency in Lagos State.

Onuakalusi contested under the Labour Party and defeated the incumbent Ganiyu Johnson of the APC with 29,386 votes to 16,650 votes.
