= YIAGA Africa =

Non profit civic hub

Yiaga Africa
- Founded: 2007; 19 years ago
- Type: Nonprofit
- Purpose: Youth Engagement, Democracy, human rights, Elections and Advocacy
- Headquarters: Nigeria
- Location: Abuja
- Region served: Gambia, Ghana, Liberia, Nigeria and Sierra Leone
- Key people: Samson Itodo (Founder) Cynthia Mbamalu (Co-Founder)
- Website: www.yiaga.org

Yiaga Africa is a non-profit civic hub of changemakers committed to the promotion of democratic governance, human rights and civic engagement. Yiaga Africa was launched as a student organization in 2007 at the University of Jos, Nigeria and has since established itself as a leading civil society organization in Africa. Since its inception, the organization has carved a niche for itself as one of Africa's frontline non-profit organizations promoting participatory democracy, human rights and civic participation. With its operational base in Abuja, Nigeria, Yiaga Africa focuses on in-depth research, providing critical analysis on key democratic and governance issues, crafting practical solutions, training and empowering citizens to lead change in their communities. Yiaga Africa implements several innovative programs aimed at stimulating active citizenship, protecting human rights and deepening democratic governance. It invests in building networks and social movements to drive social change and transformation. Yiaga Africa has leadership structures and members in all 36 states and 774 Local Government Areas (LGAs) of Nigeria. Yiaga Africa is registered in Nigeria as an independent non-profit organization. The organization is the founder of a Nigerian movement to reduce the age of running for elective offices in Nigeria known as Not Too Young To Run. The movement has created global interest in youth political participation.

== History ==
The non-profit was established in 2007 as a student group at the University of Jos, Plateau State by Samson Itodo and Cynthia Mbamalu. YIAGA is based in Abuja, Nigeria and has offices in The Gambia, Ghana, Liberia, Nigeria and Sierra Leone.

== Human Rights ==
In 2014, the organization launched a human rights project known as Thumb It Right, focused on mobilizing young people to participate in electoral processes in Nigeria. Several young radio presenters and other youths were selected to propel the campaign. The project was funded by the MacArthur Foundation.

== Not Too Young To Run Movement ==
The Age Reduction Bill, also known as the Not Too Young To Run bill, was conceived by the nonprofit, with the goal to reduce the age for running for political office in Nigeria. It is a constitutional amendment which seeks to alter Sections 65, 106, 131, and 177 of the Nigerian constitution to reduce the age of running for House of Assembly and House of Representatives from 30 years old to 25 years old, for the Senate and Governorship from 35 years old to 30 years old, and for the Presidency from 40 to 30 years old, while also advocating for independent candidacy in Nigeria. The nonprofit worked with other groups of young leaders known as strategy team members and established state coordinators across Nigeria. The campaign is now global, symbolized by the hashtag #NotTooYoungToRun.

== Monitoring the Presidential Election to Reduce Corruption ==
The nonprofit deployed 3,000 observer teams to 1,500 poling units to monitor Nigeria's 2019 Presidential Election. They published a number of reports during and after the election using their social media handles.
