= 2015 Nigerian House of Representatives elections in Taraba State =

The 2015 Nigerian House of Representatives elections in Taraba State was held on March 28, 2015, to elect members of the House of Representatives to represent Taraba State, Nigeria.

== Overview ==
Affiliation	Party		Total
Affiliation	APC	PDP	Total
Before Election	-	5	6
After Election	2	3	6

== Summary ==
District	Incumbent	Party	Elected Reps Member	Party
Bali/Gassol	Haruna Manu	PDP	Garba Hamman-Julde Chede	APC
Jalingo/Yorro/Zing	Ibrahim Yakubu Saleh	LP	Aminu Ibrahim Malle	APC
Karim Lamido/Lau/Ardo-Kola	Jerimon S Manwe	PDP	Baido Danladi Tijos	PDP
Sardauna/Gashaka/Kurmi	Ibrahim Tukur El-Sadu	PDP	Danasabe Charles Hosea	PDP
Takuma/Donga/Ussa	Albert Tanimu Sam Tsokwa	PDP	Rima M Shawulu Kwewum	PDP
Wukari/Ibi	Ishaika Mohammad Bawa	PDP	Shiddi Usman Danjuma	APGA

== Results ==
=== Bali/Gassol ===
APC candidate Garba Hamman-Julde Chede won the election, defeating other party candidates.

2015 Nigerian House of Representatives election in Taraba State
Party	Candidate	Votes	%
APC	Garba Hamman-Julde Chede		
APC hold			

=== Jalingo/Yorro/Zing ===
APC candidate Aminu Ibrahim Malle won the election, defeating other party candidates.

2015 Nigerian House of Representatives election in Taraba State
Party	Candidate	Votes	%
APC	Aminu Ibrahim Malle		
APC hold			

=== Karim Lamido/Lau/Ardo-Kola ===
PDP candidate Baido Danladi Tijos won the election, defeating other party candidates.

2015 Nigerian House of Representatives election in Taraba State
Party	Candidate	Votes	%
PDP	Baido Danladi Tijos		
PDP hold			

=== Sardauna/Gashaka/Kurmi ===
PDP candidate Danasabe Charles Hosea won the election, defeating other party candidates.

2015 Nigerian House of Representatives election in Taraba State
Party	Candidate	Votes	%
PDP	Danasabe Charles Hosea		
PDP hold			

=== Takuma/Donga/Ussa ===
PDP candidate Rima M Shawulu Kwewum won the election, defeating other party candidates.

2015 Nigerian House of Representatives election in Taraba State
Party	Candidate	Votes	%
PDP	Rima M Shawulu Kwewum		
PDP hold			

=== Wukari/Ibi ===
APGA candidate Shiddi Usman Danjuma won the election, defeating other party candidates.

2015 Nigerian House of Representatives election in Taraba State
Party	Candidate	Votes	%
APGA	Shiddi Usman Danjuma		
APGA hold			
