= Mutiu Shadimu =

Nigerian politician

Member of the House of Representatives of Nigeria for Oshodi-Isolo I Federal Constituency
- In office 2015–2019
- Preceded by: Moruf Akindelu Fatai
- Succeeded by: Dawodu Bashiru

Personal details
- Party: All Progressives Congress (Nigeria) (APC)

Mutiu Shadimu is a Nigerian politician and a former member of the House of Representative of Nigeria representing Oshodi-Isolo I Federal Constituency after he emerged winner at the 2015 Nigerian General Election in April under the platform of the People's Democratic Party.

== Education ==
Mutiu was born in 1966 in Nigeria. He attended Egba College, Ilaro, Ogun State where he obtained his West African Senior School Certificate in 1985. He is a fellow of the Institute of Chartered Accountants of Nigeria and Chartered Institute of Taxation of Nigeria.

== Employment and politics ==
Prior to becoming a member of the House of Representative, he was an Auditor, Tax And Management Consultant. In the 2015 elections, he contested for the Federal House of representatives under the Platform of the Peoples Democratic Party(PDP) and Won to represent Oshodi-Isolo I Federal Constituency. Mutiu succeeded Moruf Akinderu Fatai as the representative of Oshodi–Isolo Federal Constituency I and was later succeeded by Bashiru Ayinla Dawodu.
