= Tasir Raji =

Nigerian politician

Tasir Wale Raji is a Nigerian politician. He is currently serving as a member representing Epe Federal Constituency in the House of Representatives. Born on 12 December 1955, he hails from Lagos State and holds a Master's degree in Engineering. He was first elected into the House of Assembly at the 2015 elections, re-elected in 2019, and again in 2023 under the All Progressives Congress(APC).
