= Kayode Akiolu =

Nigerian politician

Kayode Moshood Akiolu

Federal Representative
- Constituency: Lagos Island II

Personal details
- Party: All Progressives Congress
- Parent: Oba Rilwan Akiolu
- Occupation: Lawmaker

Kayode Moshood Akiolu is a Nigerian politician. He is the current Federal Representative representing Lagos Island II constituency of Lagos State in the 10th National Assembly.

== Early life and career ==
Akiolu was born in Lagos State, Nigeria. He is the son of Oba Rilwan Akiolu. In 2019, he was elected as a member of Nigeria’s Federal House of Representatives, representing the Lagos Island II constituency. He is a member the All Progressives Congress (APC).
