= Olatunji Shoyinka =

Nigerian Politician

Honourable Olatunji Shoyinka
- Born: April 11, 1962 (age 64); Lagos
- Citizenship: Nigerian
- Occupation: Politician
- Political party: Peoples Democratic Party (PDP)

Olatunji Abiola Shoyinka is a Nigerian politician and technocrat currently serving as the Federal Representative for Surulere II Federal constituency in the 9th National Assembly at the House of Representatives level since 2019.

== Early life and career ==
Shoyinka (born April 11, 1962) hails from Lagos, Nigeria. He attended Premier Grammar School where he obtained his West African School Certificate (WASC) in 1980. After that, he went on to pursue a Higher National Diploma (HND) in Accountancy at the Lagos State College of Science and Technology, (now Lagos State University of Science and Technology) which he completed in 1986.

== Political career ==
Shoyinka was appointed Principal Secretary to the National Secretary of the Peoples Democratic Party (PDP) in 2014. From there, he entered the field of elective politics by contesting as a Federal Representative for the Surulere II Federal constituency at the 8th Nigerian National Assembly in 2015. Shoyinka was reelected into the 9th Nigerian National Assembly to serve a second term in 2019, under the umbrella of the People's Democratic Party (PDP) and nominated as the Deputy Chairman of Legislative Compliance committee in the House of Representatives.
