= Dauda Kako Are =

National Assembly Member
- Parliamentary group: Accord (Nigeria)
- Constituency: Mushin, Lagos

Personal details
- Born: July 11, 1959 (age 67) Lagos
- Education: University of Lagos
- Occupation: Accountant

Dauda Kako Are (born 11 July 1959) is an accountant and a politician. He is a member of the House of Representative of Nigeria representing Mushin I Constituency after he emerged winner at the 2015 Nigerian General Election in April under the platform of the Accord Party.

== Early life and education ==
Kako Are was born on July 11, 1959, in Lagos, Nigeria. He attended Baptist High School, Saki, Oyo State where he obtained his West African Senior School Certificate in 1977. He proceeded to University of Lagos, Akoka where he bagged his Bachelor of Science degree in Accounting in 1985.

== Political career ==
Kako Are began his political career in 1999 after being elected to represent his constituency at the Lagos State House of Assembly from 1999 to 2003 under the platform of the Action Congress of Nigeria. He contested for the Federal House of representatives under the Platform of the Accord Party(A) and Won to represent Mushin I Federal Constituency at the 2015 Nigerian General Election.
