= Alli Adeyemi =

Nigerian politician

The Honourable Alli Adeyemi

Member of the Lagos State House of Assembly
- Incumbent
- Assumed office 18 March 2023

Member of the Lagos State House of Assembly from Mushin Local Government
- Incumbent
- Assumed office 18 March 2023
- Constituency: Mushin

Personal details
- Born: 9 September 1964; 61 years ago Mushin, Mushin Local Government Lagos State Nigeria
- Party: All Progressive Congress
- Education: Lagos State University
- Alma mater: Lagos State University
- Occupation: Politician; Project Manager; Administrator

Alli Adeyemi is Nigerian politician. He serves as a member representing Mushin Federal Constituency of Lagos State in the 10th House of Representatives.

== Early life and education ==
Alli was born on 9 September 1964, he hails from Lagos State and holds a master's degree.

== Career ==
Alli was first elected into the House of Assembly at the 2019 elections, and re-elected in 2023 under the All Progressives Congress (APC).
