= Yakub Abiodun Balogun =

Nigerian politician

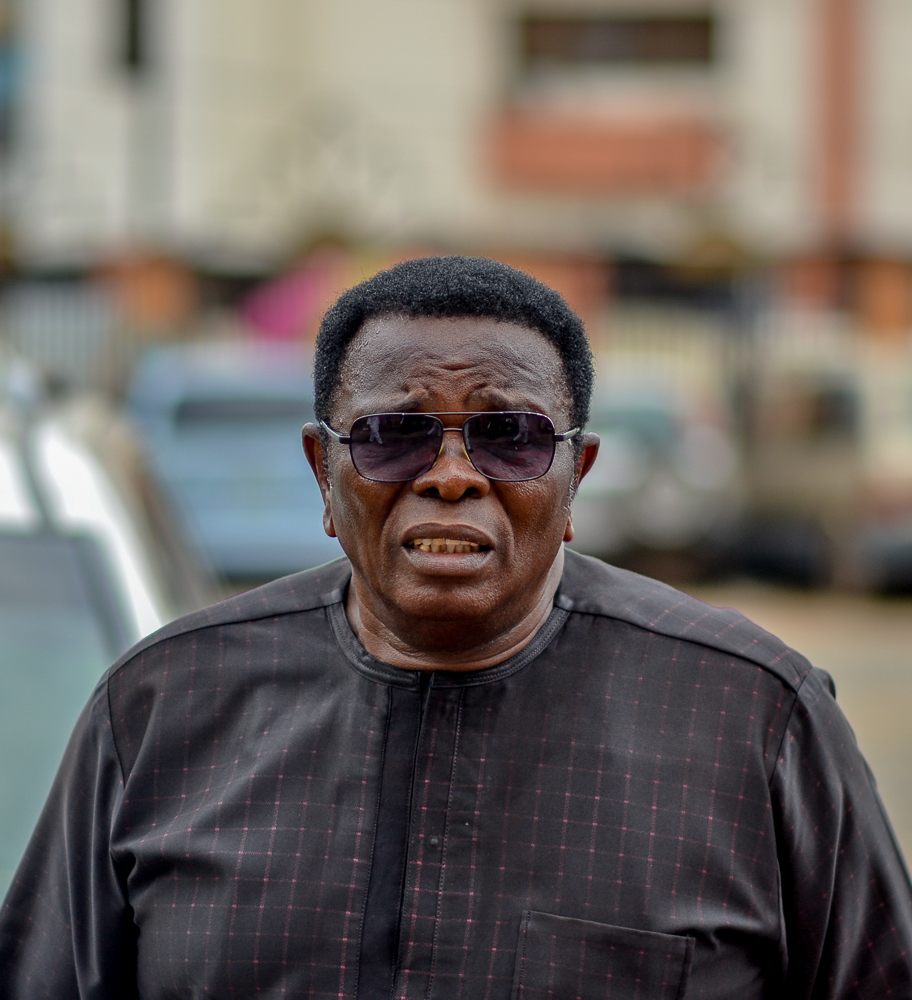

Member of the Federal House of Representatives of Nigeria
- In office 2011–2015
- Constituency: Lagos, Lagos Island Federal Constituency II

Personal details
- Born: 4 May 1951 (age 75) Lagos State, Nigeria
- Party: All Progressives Congress
- Education: University of Ibadan

Yakub Abiodun Balogun (born 5 May 1951) is a Nigerian economist, public administrator, legislator in the House of Representatives of Nigeria, representing Lagos Island Federal Constituency II, Lagos State, South-West Nigeria and former Lagos State Head of Service.

== Early life ==
Balogun Yakub was born on 5 May 1951 in Lagos Island, the principal and central local government area of the Metropolitan Lagos state southwestern Nigeria. He attended Fazil-Omar Ahmadiyya Primary School, Lagos before he proceeded to Ansar-Ud-Deen Grammar School in Surulere but obtained the West African School Certificate at Ahmadiyya College, Agege. He obtained a bachelor's and master's degrees in Economics from the University of Ibadan in 1976 and 1983 respectively before he proceeded to the Royal Institute of Public Administration where he received a certificate in Public administration in 1996.

== Civil service ==
He joined the Lagos State Civil Service in 1977 as assistant secretary in Ministry of Economic Development and Establishments. In 1990, he rose to the position of Assistant Director, of Taxes at Ministry of Finance. Having served at different capacity in the civil service, he was appointed a Permanent Secretary, Ministry of Finance in 1997, a position he held until he was appointed as Head of Service in 1999 under the administration of Chief Bola Tinubu, the former Governor of Lagos State and the National leader of the All Progressives Congress (APC). In May 2010, he retired from the Lagos State Civil Service to join politics.

== Political life ==
In April 2011, he contested the seat of his constituency, Lagos Island Federal Constituency II, which he won. Balogun took oath of office as Member, House of Representatives, representing Lagos Island Federal Constituency II, Lagos State, on Monday, 6 June 2011 during the inauguration of the Seventh House of Representatives. He served until 2015.
