= Dawodu Bashiru =

Nigerian politician

Dawodu Bashiru Ayinla is a Nigerian politician. He currently serves as the Federal Representative representing Oshodi-Isolo I constituency in the 10th National Assembly.
