= Enitan Badru =

Nigerian politician (born 1953)

Honourable (Dr.) Enitan Dolapo Badru
- Born: 30 January 1953 (age 73); Lagos Island, Lagos State, Nigeria
- Occupation: Politician
- Political party: All Progressives Congress

Enitan Dolapo Badru (born 30 January 1953) is a Nigerian politician and member of the House of Representatives of Nigeria representing the Lagos Island I Federal Constituency after he emerged as the winner at the 2015 Nigerian general election under the platform of the All Progressives Congress (APC). He was reelected in 2019.

== Early life, education and career ==
Enitan was born on 30 January 1953 in Lagos State, Nigeria. He received his Higher National Diploma in Education in 1986. He obtained his Master of Business Administration in 1991. He proceeded to pursue his Doctor of Philosophy degree in Business Administration in 1997. He is the founder/Chairman of DOLBAD Insurance Brokers.

== Political career ==
In 2003, he was appointed as the Special Adviser to former Governor Bola Tinubu and served until 2007. He was also appointed as the Special Adviser for Youth and Social Development by the then Governor Babatunde Fashola and served for eight years. He then decided to go into Parliament and represent his constituency under the platform of the All Progressives Congress (APC) in 2015.

== Sponsored and co-sponsored bills ==
He has sponsored several bills, including the National Mathematical Centre Act (Amendment) Bill of 2016, the Elderly and Vulnerable Persons Bill of 2016, and the Government Infrastructural Continuity (Establishment) Bill of 2017. In addition, he co-sponsored the Constitution of the Federal Republic of Nigeria, 1999 (Alteration) Bill of 2016 and a bill that seeks to amend the Trafficking in Persons (Prohibition) Law Enforcement and Administration Act of 2016. The aim of the bill is to punish severely anyone who engages in the terrible acts of selling or trafficking human pregnancies, running factories that produce babies, or harboring pregnant minors or adults. The bill also seeks to penalize individuals who attempt to buy or sell newborn babies.

He also moved the motion on the need for the Federal Government to come to the aid of the families of Abule Ado explosion near Lagos International Trade Fair Complex where gas explosion occurred with casualties on 15 March 2020.

== Empowerment programme ==
Enitan Badru recognizes that empowering youths and women is the most effective way to develop the economy, as they constitute a significant portion of society. To demonstrate his commitment to this idea, he distributed vehicles and sewing machines to approximately 300 people and constructed six classrooms in Lagos Island.
