= Ayinla Omowura =

Nigerian Apala musician

Alhaji Ayinla Omowura

Background information
- Also known as: Ayinla Omowura; Hadji (Alhaji) Costly; Egunmogaji of Egbaland; Anigilaje
- Born: Waidi Ayinla Yusuf Gbogbolowo; 1933; Itoko, Abeokuta
- Died: 6 May 1980 (aged 46–47) Bar in Ago-Ika, Abeokuta
- Genre: Apala
- Occupation: Musician
- Years active: 1970–1980
- Label: EMI Records

Waidi Ayinla Yusuf Gbogbolowo better known as Ayinla Omowura (1933 – 6 May 1980) was a Nigerian Apala musician born in Itoko, Abeokuta in 1933.

== Biography ==
Omowura was the son of Yusuff Gbogbolowo, a blacksmith, and Wuramotu Morenike. He did not have formal education and started out working at his father's smithy but left and went on to working several jobs as a driver, butcher, carpenter and bus park boy. He was however discovered by Adewole Alao Oniluola, who later became his lead drummer and started an apprenticeship in Olalomi, an Apala variant.

Omowura was known for feuding with other musicians including his superiors such as Haruna Ishola. He also feuded with Ayinde Barrister, Fatai Olowonyo, Yesufu Olatunji and Dauda Epo Akara.

These feuds colored his music throughout his discography. He was noted to have a quick temper and to engage in marijuana use and physical altercations.

Despite being unlettered, Omowura was enlightened about current events and had a command of puns, proverbs, innuendos, and metaphors. He was a social commentator and critic as well as a moral instructor. He often served as a mouthpiece for passing on government policies to the masses and was also a messenger of the masses back to the government. In his 1976 album, Owo Udoji, he hailed the government for salary increment but however demanded for same increment in the private sector. In Orin Owo Ile Eko, He explained the Lagos rent edict to his listeners and also praised the Mobolaji Johnson-led Lagos State government for the masses-oriented programme. He influenced the response of the people to the policy and also explained the National Census of 1973 in his album National Census. In the 1973 album, Challenge Cup '73 he explained the change in driving from the left to the right hand side and the change of the Nigerian Currency from the colonial Pound Sterling to the Naira and Kobo during the General Yakubu Gowon-led military government. Asides current affairs, he used his albums to extol the importance of sporting activities. His music also preached positive change in society and portrayed both mourning and celebration. He was also a critic of women who bleached their skin and promiscuous women.

He had many aliases and earned the moniker, Hadji Costly because of his flamboyant dressing in agbadas made of high-quality Swiss lace and gold jewellery. His other aliases include Egunmogaji, Anigilaje and Alujannu Elere which demonstrated his status as the enfant terrible in music of the time.

Omowura was a Muslim by birth, he practiced the religion and performed the Hajj in 1975. He however also engaged in traditional religion practices. He was married to Afusatu of the Ile Eleni clan and Tawakalitu Owonikoko.

== Discography ==
He made 22 LP records which were released by EMI Records (now Ivory Records Nigeria), 2 of which were released posthumously and have remained in circulation.

1972 – National Population Census

1972 – Challenge Cup ’72

1973 – Orin Owo Ile Eko (Lagos Rent Edict)

1973 – Challenge Cup '73

1974 – Challenge Cup ’74

1976 – Owo Udoji

Owo Tuntun

== Death ==
Omowura was killed in a bar room brawl on May 6, 1980 aged 47. He died from a cerebral haemorrhage after being struck on the head with a beer mug by Bayewu, his manager at the time. Bayewu was taken to court and sentenced to death a few years later. On the day he died, EMI Records recorded at least 50,000 copies sale on each of his albums.

== Legacy ==
Following the death of Omowura in 1980 and Haruna Ishola in 1983, the popularity of Apala music waned and has been largely replaced by Fuji music. New school Nigerian musicians, Terry Apala, Mayolee and Q-dot Alagbe have made music influenced by Omowura's style.

Omowura's feud with Ayinde Barrister served as the foundation for the musical enmity between Barrister and Kollington as Kollington took on the form, and pattern of Omowura's music and also inherited Omowura's adversaries.

An album titled Anigilaje was released in his memory on the 40th year anniversary of his death. It was a collaborative effort by Oyetola Oniwide, a professor and radio presenter, Sefiu Alao, a Fuji musician and Halimat Omowura, Apala singer and Omowura's daughter. Omowura's 95-year old drummer played the drums on the 13-tracked project which was vocalised by Sefiu Alao.

Ibikunle Amosun, a former governor of Ogun State renovated Omowura's Itoko, Abeokuta residence in anticipation of the 40th year anniversary of his death.

Lawyer and journalist, Festus Adedayo published a biography titled Ayinla Omowura: Life and Times of an Apala Legend in 2020. When asked why Omowura remains relevant, Adedayo replied that “Ayinla has always had a cult following, even till now, many of his followers see his songs as evergreen. Till today, seldom would you find a musician who has his kind of lacerating lyrics. That lacuna cannot and has yet to be filled by any other musician.”

Director and producer, Tunde Kelani, also an Abeokuta native who as a child, caught a glimpse of Omowura in his neighbourhood, made a film eponymously titled Ayinla that was released on June 18, 2021.
