= Tajudeen Obasa =

Nigerian politician

National Assembly member
- Incumbent
- Assumed office 2015
- Preceded by: Ojelabi Oyefolu
- Constituency: Ojo

Personal details
- Born: Tajudeen Adekunle Obasa; 29 August 1970 (age 56) Ojo, Lagos State
- Party: Social Democratic Party (1991-1993); United Nigeria Congress Party (1997); Movement for Democracy and Justice (1998); People's Democratic Party (1999-present)
- Spouse: Aishat Obasa
- Education: Lagos State University
- Occupation: Politician; Human rights activist
- Website: tajudeenobasa.com

Tajudeen Adekunle Obasa// (born 29 August 1970), popularly known as Eniafe, is a Nigerian politician, human rights activist and a member of the Nigerian National Assembly representing Ojo constituency after he emerged winner at the 2015 elections in April under the platform of the People's Democratic Party.

== Early life ==
Obasa was born in Ojo, a town and local government area in Lagos. In 1970, he completed his primary school education at St. Michael Primary School, Ojo and later proceeded to Awori College, Ojo where he obtained his West African Senior School Certificate in 1989. He also holds a Diploma in Law after graduating from Lagos State University.

== Political career ==
Prior to his election as a member of the Nigerian House of Representatives, he has served in different political positions including being the Special Assistant to Hon. Oladipo Akinola Olaitan; as the local government chairman of Union Group Cacaus of the People's Democratic Party (PDP). He once contested in an unsuccessful bid for a seat at the Nigerian Senate under the platform of Progressive Action Congress.
