= Tony Nwulu =

Nigerian politician

Tony Chinedu Nwulu

Member of the House of Representatives of Nigeria
- In office 2015–2019
- Preceded by: Abiodun Muniru
- Succeeded by: Ganiyu Johnson

Personal details
- Born: 14 November 1978 (age 47) Ezinihitte Mbaise Local Government, Imo State, Nigeria
- Party: United Progressive Party (UPP)
- Children: 3
- Occupation: Legislature, Executive

Tony Chinedu Nwulu a former member of the House of Representatives of Nigeria representing the Oshodi-Isolo II constituency. A member of the United Progressive Party (UPP), after defecting from the PDP, under whose banner he won the 2015 general election. He sponsored the passing of the Not Too Young To Run bill.

== Early life ==
Nwulu was born on 14 November 1978 in Ezinihitte Mbaise Local Government Area of Imo State, Nigeria. He attended secondary schools in Abia and Anambra states before obtaining university degrees and professional certifications. He also completed executive training at the Harvard Kennedy School, where he received certification as a Global Change Agent.

== Political career ==
Nwulu was elected to the House of Representatives in the 2015 Nigerian general election, representing the Oshodi–Isolo II Federal Constituency of Lagos State. He served as a member of the 8th National Assembly from 2015 to 2019. In September 2018, he resigned from the People's Democratic Party (PDP) and joined the United Progressive Party.

In 2023 Imo State governorship election, he was nominated as the Labour Party's deputy governorship candidate.
