= Accord (Nigeria) =

Political party in Nigeria

- National Chairman: Maxwell Mgbudem
- National Secretary: Adebukola Ajaja
- Founded: 2006
- Headquarters: No.15 Jos Street, Area 3, Garki, Abuja, Nigeria
- Ideology: Corporatism; Populism
- Political position: Centre-right
- Colours: Green
- Seats in the Senate: 1 / 109
- Seats in the House: 0 / 360
- Governorships: 1 / 36
- Seats in State Houses of Assembly: 34 / 991

Website
- https://accordnational.com.ng/

Accord is a political party in Nigeria. In the 2015 National Assembly of Nigeria election, the party won one seat in the House of Representatives (Dauda Kako Abayomi Are from Mushin I constituency); it won none of 109 seats in the Senate.

== History ==
Accord’s national leadership changed in July 2024, when Maxwell Mgbudem succeeded Muhammad Lawal Nalado as national chairman.

In November 2025, Osun State governor Ademola Adeleke joined Accord after leaving the Peoples Democratic Party. Adeleke said that he selected the party as the platform on which he would contest for a second term. Adeleke was subsequently nominated as Accord’s candidate for the 2026 Osun State governorship election.

In the election held on 15 August 2026, he was re-elected with 511,067 votes. Bola Oyebamiji of the All Progressives Congress finished second with 444,815 votes. Adeleke’s victory gave Accord control of its first state government.

== Chairmen of Accord ==
- Ikra Aliyu Ibilbis (2006–2007)
- Longers Nzenwata Anyanwu (2007–2008)
- Muhammad Lawal Nalado (2008–2024)
- Barrister Maxwell Obinali Mgbudem (2024–present)
