= Abiodun Faleke =

Nigerian politician (born 1959)

Hon. Member Nigeria Federal House of Representatives from Lagos State
- Incumbent
- Assumed office June 2011
- Constituency: Ikeja Federal Constituency

Chairman House Committee on Finance
- Incumbent
- Assumed office 15 July 2019

Personal details
- Born: 25 December 1959 (age 66) Ekinrin Adde, Ijumu LGA in the old Kabba Province (now Kogi West)
- Party: All Progressives Congress, APC
- Education: MBA Business Administration (Management)
- Alma mater: Kaduna Polytechnic
- Occupation: Logistics Consultant, Business Management Consultant and Politician
- Website: nassng.org

Abiodun James Faleke// (born 25 December 1959) is a business management and logistic consultant. He is a politician and a member of Nigeria’s House of Representatives from commercial hub city of Lagos. In his early career, Faleke worked in senior managerial positions with several high profile companies. He was with Aluminium Manufacturing Company of Nigeria (ALUMCO) PLC as Purchasing Manager and in early 2000, he moved his services to Crown Agents Ltd as Commercial Manager.

Faleke joined active politics in 2003 after Ahmed Bola Tinibu, then governor of Lagos state appointment him first Executive Secretary of newly created Ojodu Local Council Development Area (LCDA) of Lagos state. In 2011, Faleke won a vote to represent Ikeja Federal Constituency of Lagos state in the Nigeria’s Federal House of Representatives. In 2015, he ran on a joint ticket as deputy governorship candidate to Abubakar Audu in his home state of Kogi. They won majority votes cast in the keenly contested election displacing People’s Democratic Party, PDP for the first time in more than a decade with comfortable winning margin. But Abubakar Audu died shortly before the official declaration of the results. Their party, the All Progressives Congress, APC then transferred the votes to Yahaya Bello who was first runner up in the party’s primary election. Faleke challenged the decision of the party up to the Supreme Court but lost.

== Early life and education ==
Faleke was born in Ekinrin Adde in Ijumu Local Government Area in the old Kabba Province. With the creation of Kogi State in 1991, Ijumu Local Government Area became a part of Kogi West. Faleke had his early education in Ijumu. He is an old student of Abdulazeez Atta Memorial College, Okene. In 1986, he finished from Kaduna Polytechnic with a Higher National Diploma (HND) in Purchasing and Supply Management with an award of the best student of his class with Upper Credit.

He holds master's degree (MBA) in Business Administration with management as the major focus from Imo State university, Owerri in 2003. He is a Fellow of chartered Institute of Purchasing Supply (CIPS), London, and Fellow, Institute of Public Administration (IPA).

Between 1986 and 2003, Faleke worked in several management positions in logistics- procurement, clearing and forwarding, warehousing, distribution and construction. In 1986, during his National Youth Service, Faleke was Purchasing Expediter at National Orthopaedic Hospital, Lagos. He was Material Manager at Kayo Foods Limited, Ilupeju, Lagos before moving to Tate Industries PLC as Purchasing, Clearing, Distribution and Commercial Manager. Faleke also served as Purchasing manager at Air Liquid PLC, and Aluminium Manufacturing Company of Nigeria (ALUMCO) PLC ending his logistics and management career with Crown Agents Ltd as Commercial Manager in 2003.

== Political career ==
Faleke political career started in 2003 with his appointment as pioneer Executive Secretary of Ojudu Local Council Development Area (LCDA) of Lagos State. He was in this position in interim capacity between November 2003 and April 2004, when he was elected substantive chairman of the local government. He held this office for two terms ending in 2011.

In 2006, he won a vote to become Chairman of Conference 57, (the body of Local Government Chairmen) in Lagos State until 2011, when his tenure as Ojodu LCDA Chairman ended. Faleke during this period held assignments on the Lagos State Electoral Reform Committee and the Governor’s Advisory Committee of Lagos State.

=== Election to House of Representatives ===
Faleke was elected to Nigeria’s Federal House of Representatives in 2011, to represent Ikeja Federal constituency of Lagos state. He is known for his brilliant contributions to debates in the house. He was chairman of the House Committee on Anti-Corruption, National Ethics and Values, and member of house committees on Public Procurement, MDGs, Interior, Public Accounts, Science and Technology, and the House Committee on the Petroleum Subsidy Probe.

==== Bills Sponsored ====
Faleke sponsored a number of bills, including the NYSC Act Amendment Bill, which proposed life insurance coverage for NYSC members, a bill prohibiting the sale and use of military uniforms due to the attendant security risks and, still focusing on the nation’s security challenges, he sponsored another motion on the need to shut over 1,400 illegal border routes to curb insurgency.

== 2015 governorship election in Kogi State ==
Faleke was deputy governorship candidate to Abubakar Audu in the November 2015 governorship election in Kogi State. They ran on a joint ticket sponsored by All Progressives Congress, APC. Audu and Faleke campaigned for votes across the 21 local government areas of the state with populist agenda and promise to improve living standard of the people.

Audu and Faleke were in comfortable lead from official results from the 21 local government areas of the state. Election victory celebration was underway when Abubakar Audu’s death was announced. Independent National Electoral Commission, INEC then declared the election inclusive.

According to results declared by the Returning Officer, Emmanuel Kucha (Vice-Chancellor of the University of Agriculture, Makurdi), Abubakar Audu/James Abiodum Faleke of the All Progressives Congress scored 240,867 while Idris Wada who was the incumbent governor running for a second term on the platform of the People’s Democratic Party, PDP garnered 199,514 votes.

Mr. Kucha said the margin of votes between Messrs Audu and Wada is 41,353. And that the election was inconclusive because the total number of registered voters in 91 polling units, in 18 local government areas, where election was cancelled is 49,953.

That figure is higher than the 41,353 votes with which Mr. Audu is ahead of Mr. Wada.

=== APC transferred Audu/Faleke votes to Yahaya Bello ===
After the death of Audu and the declaration of the election inclusive, APC nominated Yahaya Bello who was the first runner up in the APC primary to inherit the votes received by Audu/Faleke in the general elections asking Faleke to continue in his deputy governor position. But faleke rejected the move by the APC arguing that collation of results of the election had been concluded and was awaiting official declaration of winner before the sudden death of Audu and that as the only surviving candidate on the joint ticket he should be declared governor elect. Faleke wrote INEC declaring himself "governor elect". But APC ignored his argument and went into supplementary election with Yahaya Bello as its governorship candidate.

According to the supplementary election results declared by Mr. Kucha, Vice Chancellor, University of Agriculture, Makurdi, the APC garnered 6,885 votes, bringing the total votes it received to 247,752, having polled 240,857 in the November 21 election.

The second runner up, the People’s Democratic Party and its candidate, Idris Wada, who was the incumbent governor, scored 5,363 in the supplementary election. Thus, PDP polled a total of 204, 877 votes, having had 199,514 at the November 21 election.

=== Faleke challenged decision of APC in court ===
Faleke went to election petition tribunal challenging the legality of the decision of the APC to make him a deputy to Yahaya Bello who was not on the ballot on 21 November when major votes in the election were cast.

He told his party that he would not be available for inauguration as deputy to Governor Yahaya Bello. “I will not disappoint Prince Abubakar Audu. I, James Abiodun Faleke, will not be there for the swearing-in if we don't finish the case before the Jan. 27, 2016”. “Nobody consulted me before making me a deputy to Bello. Bello too did not consult me. I have made my position known to the party leadership on this. I am not ready to betray and disappoint Prince Abubakar Audu.” In keeping to this vow, Faleke did not present himself for inauguration as deputy to Yahaya Bello.
