= Oshodi-Isolo =

Local Government Area within Lagos State, Nigeria

Oshodi-Isolo Oṣòdì-Ìsọlọ̀
- LGA and suburb
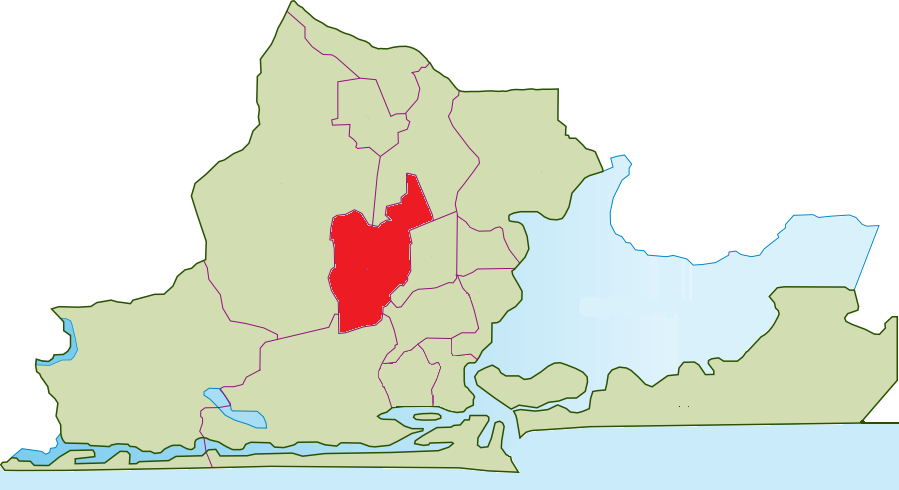
- Location in Lagos
- Interactive map of Oshodi-Isolo
- Country: Nigeria
- State: Lagos State
- Headquarter: Oshodi

Area
  - Total: 45 km^{2} (17 sq mi)

Population (2022)
  - Total: 931,300
  - Density: 21,000/km^{2} (54,000/sq mi)
- Time zone: UTC+1 (WAT)

Oshodi-Isolo (Yoruba: Oṣòdì-Ìsọlọ̀) is a suburb of Lagos and a Local Government Area (LGA) within Lagos State. It was formed by the second republic Governor of Lagos State, Alhaji Lateef Kayode Jakande, also known as 'Baba Kekere', and the first Executive Chairman of the Local Government was the late Sir Isaac Ademolu Banjoko. The LGA is part of the Ikeja Division of Lagos State, Nigeria. At the 2006 Census it had a population of 621,509 people, and an area of 45 sq km (17 mi²). On 1 August 2021, Honourable Kehinde Oloyede Al-Maroof was elected for a first term into office as the Executive Chairman.

== Wards ==
The Local Government was constituted by eleven wards as below listed:

1. Oshodi/Bolade
2. Orile Oshodi
3. Mafoluku
4. Shogunle
5. Shogunle/Alasia
6. Isolo
7. Ajao Estate
8. Ilasamaja
9. Okota
10. Ishagatedo
11. Oke-Afa/Ejigbo

== Politics ==
The first Executive Chairman of Isolo LCDA is Mrs. Mary Modupeola Fafowora-Oseghale who served for two terms in office and also as an Executive Secretary between 2004 and 2011.

It is represented in the Lagos state House of Assembly by Shokunle Hakeem (APC) for Oshodi/Isolo I and Emeka Odimogu Oshodi (APC) for Isolo II.

In the House of Representatives, Dawodu Bashiru and Ganiyu Abiodun Johnson both of the APC represent the Oshodi-Isolo I and Oshodi-Isolo II respectively.

== Gallery ==
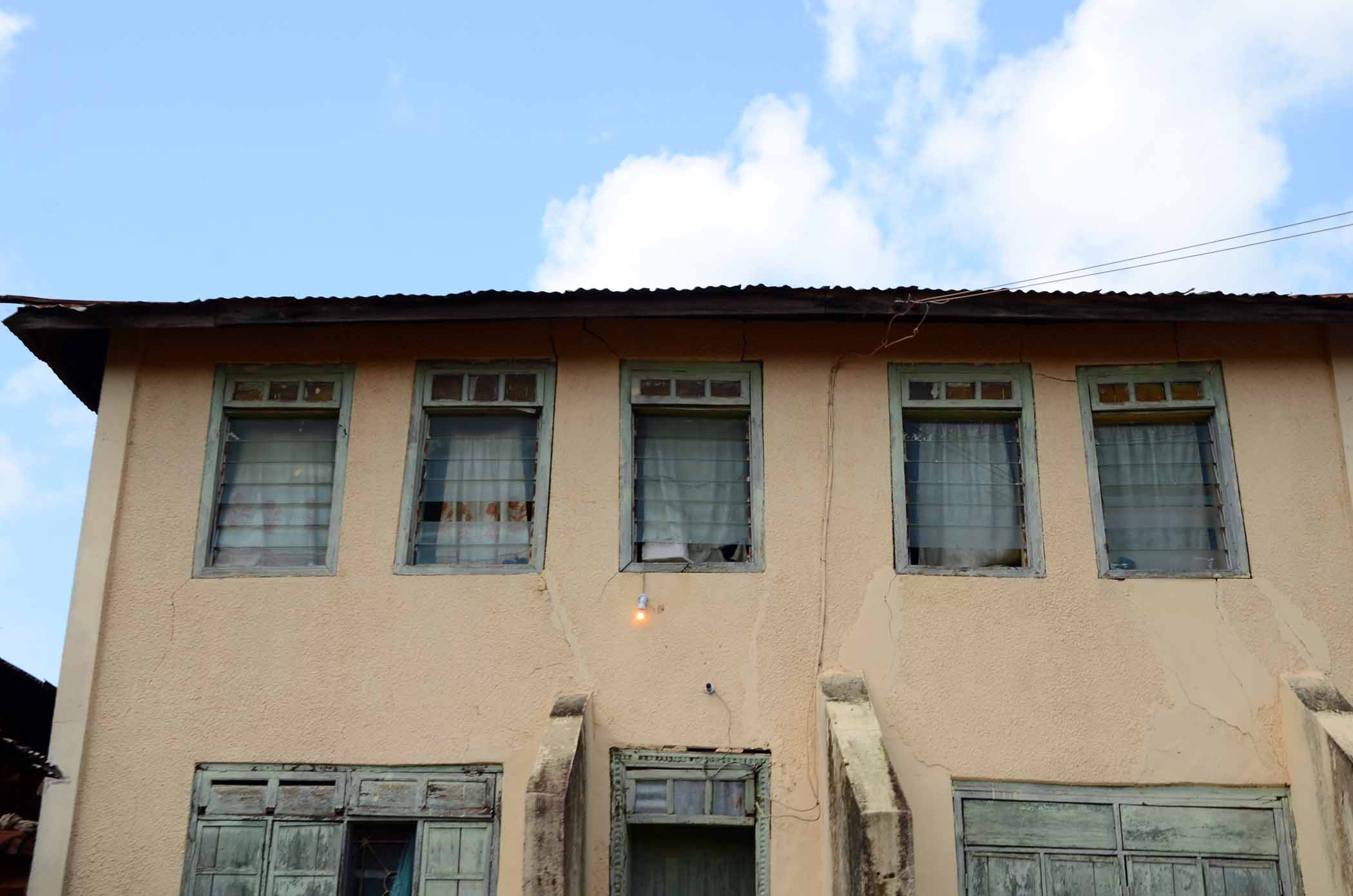

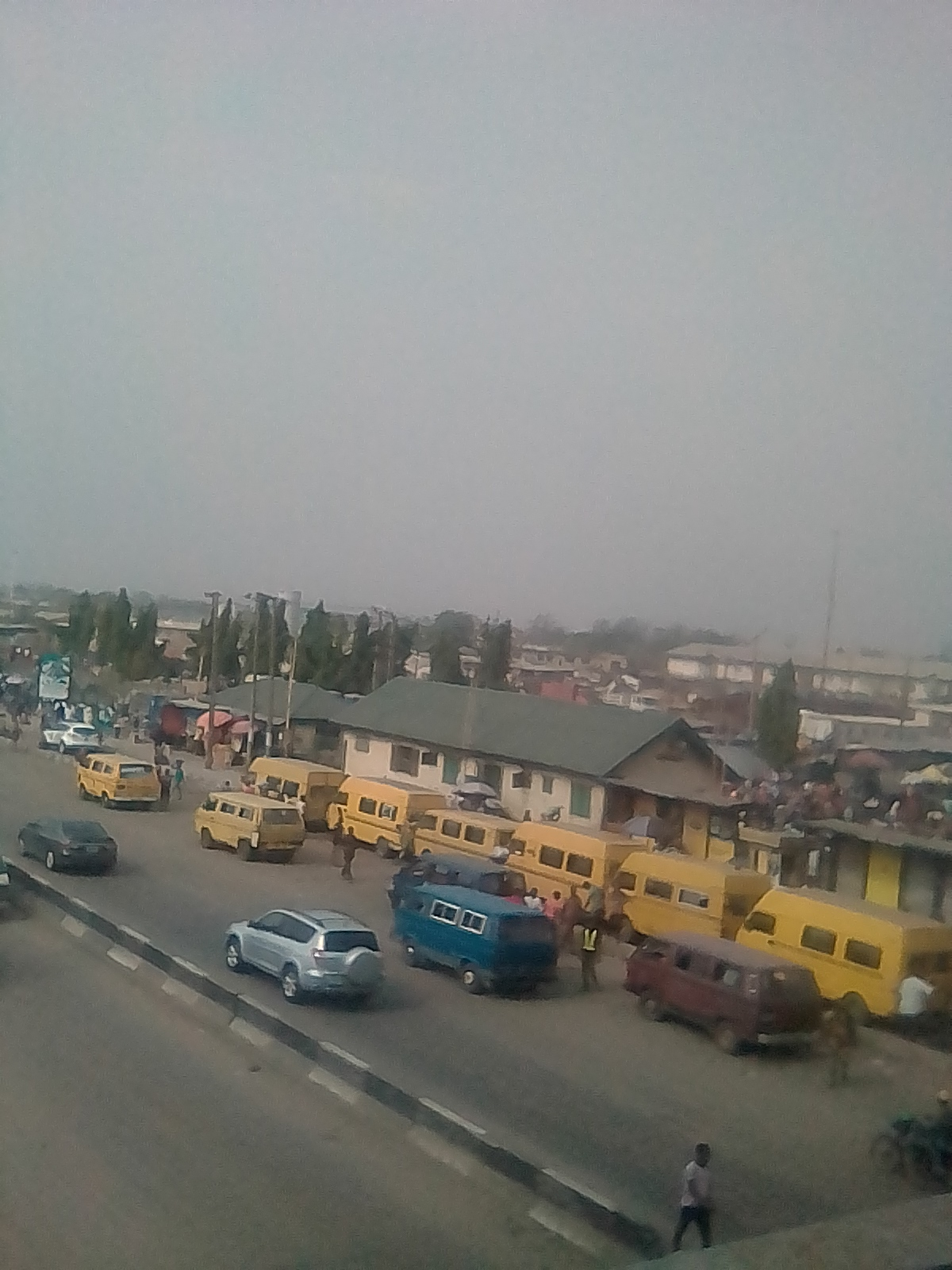
