= Bolaji Ayinla =

Nigerian politician

Honourable Bolaji Yusuf Ayinla
- Born: 10 October 1959 (age 66)
- Occupation: Politician
- Political party: All Progressives Congress (APC)
- Other political affiliations: Action Congress of Nigeria (ACN)

Bolaji Yusuf Ayinla// (popularly known as B.Y.A) is a Nigerian politician and member of the House of Representative of Nigeria representing Mushin II Federal Constituency. He was elected at the 2015 Nigerian general election under the platform of the All Progressive Congress (APC).

== Early life and education ==
Ayinla was born on 10 October 1959 in Lagos, Nigeria. He attended Muslim High School, Sagamu, Ogun State where he obtained his West African Senior School Certificate.

Ayinla expressed an interest in pursuing a military career, specifically as a soldier or pilot, but was unable to meet the requirements due to poor eyesight and was not accepted. He proceeded to the Centre for Marketing and Management Studies, where he obtained a diploma.

== Political career ==
Ayinla began his political career in 2003 when he was elected to represent his constituency at the Lagos State House of Assembly from 2003 to 2015 under the platform of the Action Congress of Nigeria (ACN). He was chairman of the Lagos State House of Assembly Committee on Public Accounts. After serving three terms in the State House of Assembly, he contested for a seat in the House of Representatives under the platform of the All Progressive Congress (APC) and was elected to represent Mushin II Federal Constituency at the 2015 Nigerian general election. In 2018, Ayinla moved a motion for the gradual and consistent repair and maintenance of roads across Nigeria.
