= List of members of the Lagos State House of Assembly (2023–2027) =

This is the list of members elected into the 10th Lagos State House of Assembly.

The 10th Lagos State House of Assembly was inaugurated on June 6, 2023, by the Lagos State Governor, Mr. Babajide Sanwo-Olu. After the inauguration, an election was conducted to choose the Speaker and other principal officers of the 10th Assembly. After the election, Mudashiru Obasa, who is serving his sixth term in the Lagos State House of Assembly, was re-elected for his third term as the speaker of the 10th Lagos State House of Assembly.

The All Progressives Congress won 38 seats while the Labour Party won two seats.

== List of principal members ==
Name	Position	Constituency	Party	Term	Year
RT. HON. MUDASHIRU AJAYI OBASA	RT. HON. SPEAKER	Agege 01	APC	-	2023
HON. MOJISOLA LASBAT MERANDA	DEPUTY SPEAKER	Apapa 01	APC	-	2023
HON. Noheem Babatunde Adams	Majority Leader	Eti Osa 01	APC	-	2023
HON. Adedamola Richard Kasunmu	Deputy Majority Leader	Ikeja 02	APC	-	2023
HON. Mojeed Fatai Adebola	Chief Whip	Ibeju Lekki 01	APC	-	2023
HON. (ENGR.) Setonji David	Deputy Chief Whip	Badagary 02	APC	-	2023

== List of all members ==
Name	Position	Constituency	Party	Term	Year
1. Rt. Hon. Mudashiru A. Obasa	Speaker	Agege 01	APC	6th term	2023
2. HON. Abdulkareem Jubreel Ayodeji	Member	Agege 02	APC	1st term	2023
3. Hon. Olumoh Saad Lukman	Member	Ajeromi-Ifelodun 01	APC	2nd	2023
4. Hon. Oluwa Sabur Akanbi	Member	Ajeromiifelodun 02	APC	1st	2023
5. Hon. Jimoh Orelope	Member	Alimosho 01	APC	1st	2023
6. Hon. Kehinde O. Joseph	Member	Alimosho 02	APC	2nd	2023
7. Hon. Foluke Osafile	Member	Amuwo Odofin 01	LP	1st term	2023
8. Hon. Tunde Fashina	Member	Amuwo Odofin 02	LP	1st term	2023
9. Hon. Mojisola Lasbat Meranda	Deputy speaker	Apapa 01	APC	3rd	2023
10. Hon Aina Lawal	Member	Apapa 02	APC	1st	2023
11. Hon. Solomon Bonu	Member	Badagry 01	APC	1st	2023
12. Hon. (Engr.) Setonji David Samuel	Deputy Chief Whip	Badagry 02	APC	3rd	2023
13 Hon. Tobun Abiodun	Member	Epe 01	APC	3rd	2023
14 Hon. Sylvester O. Ogunkelu	Member	Epe 02	APC	2nd	2023
15 Hon. Noheem Adams	Majority Leader	Eti Osa 01	APC	3rd*	2023
16 Hon. (Engr.) Yishawu Olusegun Gbolahan	Member	Eti Osa 02	APC	3rd	2023
17. Hon. Fatai Mojeed	Chief Whip	Ibeju Lekki 01	APC	3rd	2023
18 Hon. Oladele Ajayi	Member	Ibeju Lekki 02	APC	1st	2023
19. Hon. Temitope Adedeji Adewale	Member	Ifako Ijaiye 01	APC	2nd	2023
20 Hon. Emmanuel Olotu	Member	Ifako Ijaiye 02	APC	1st	2023
21 Hon. Adeseyi Lawal	Member	Ikeja 01	APC	1st	2023
22 Hon. Kasunmu Adedamola	Deputy Majority Leader	Ikeja 02	APC	3rd	2023
23.Hon. Gbolahan Ogunleye	Member	Ikorodu 01	APC	1st	2023
24 Hon. Moshood Aro	Member	Ikorodu 02	APC	1st	2023
25 Hon. Sanni Ganiyu B.	Member	Kosofe 01	APC	2nd	2023
26 Hon. Saheed Femi	Member	Kosofe 02	APC	2nd*	2023
27 Hon Olumegbon Lawal	Member	Lagos Island 01	APC	1st	2023
28 Hon. Olanrewaju S. Afinni	Member	Lagos Island 02	APC	2nd	2023
29 Hon Owolabi Ibrahim A.	Member	Lagos Mainland 01	APC	2nd	2023
30 Hon. Rasheed Adebola Shabi	Member	Lagos Mainland 02	APC	1st	2023
31 Hon Akinsanya A. Nureni	Member	Mushin 01	APC	2nd	2023
32 Hon. Olayinka Kazeem	Member	Mushin 02	APC	1st	2023
33 Hon. Olusegun Ege	Member	Ojo 01	APC	1st	2023
34 Hon. Tijani Suraju O.	Member	Ojo 02	APC	2nd	2023
35 Hon. Stephen Ogundipe	Member	Oshodi Isolo 01	APC	1st	2023
36 Hon. Oladapo Ajomale	Member	Oshodi Isolo 02	APC	1st	2023
37 HON. OREKOYA ABIODUN ABIMBOLA	Member	Somolu 01	APC	1st	2023
38 HON. APATA SAMUEL OLU	Member	Somolu 02	APC	1st	2023
39 Hon. Elliot Desmond O.	Member	Surulere 01	APC	3rd	2023
40 Hon. (Mrs.) Sangodara Mosunmola Rotimi	Member	Surulere 02	APC	3rd	2023
