= 2015 Lagos State House of Assembly election =

- 11 April 2015

All 40 seats in the Lagos State House of Assembly 21 seats needed for a majority
	Majority party
Leader	Mudashiru Obasa
Party	APC
Leader's seat	Agege I
Last election	40
Seats after	40
Seat change	Steady
Speaker before election
Adeyemi Ikuforiji
APC
Elected Speaker
Mudashiru Obasa
APC

The 2015 Lagos State House of Assembly election was held on 11 April 2015, to elect members of the Lagos State House of Assembly in Nigeria. All the 40 seats were up for election in the Lagos State House of Assembly. APC won 32 seats, while PDP won 8 seats.

Upon the opening of the 8th State House of Assembly, Mudashiru Obasa (APC-Agege I) was elected as Speaker of the House while Wasiu Sanni (APC-Lagos Island I) and Agunbiade Sanai (APC-Ikorodu I) became Deputy Speaker and House Leader, respectively.

== Results ==
=== Badagry I ===
APC candidate Layode Olanrewaju won the election.

2015 Lagos State House of Assembly election
Party	Candidate	Votes	%
APC	Layode Olanrewaju		
APC hold			

=== Apapa II ===
APC candidate Jimoh Olumuyiwa won the election.

2015 Lagos State House of Assembly election
Party	Candidate	Votes	%
APC	Jimoh Olumuyiwa		
APC hold			

=== Apapa I ===
APC candidate Lawal Mojisola Lasbat won the election.

2015 Lagos State House of Assembly election
Party	Candidate	Votes	%
APC	Lawal Mojisola Lasbat		
APC hold			

=== Alimosho I ===
APC candidate Adebisi Yusuff won the election.

2015 Lagos State House of Assembly election
Party	Candidate	Votes	%
APC	Adebisi Yusuff		
APC hold			

=== Alimosho II ===
APC candidate Oduntan Omotayo won the election.

2015 Lagos State House of Assembly election
Party	Candidate	Votes	%
APC	Oduntan Omotayo		
APC hold			

=== Agege II ===
APC candidate Oluyinka Ogundimu won the election.

2015 Lagos State House of Assembly election
Party	Candidate	Votes	%
APC	Kehinde Joseph		
APC hold			

=== Agege I ===
APC candidate Mudashiru Obasa won the election.

2015 Lagos State House of Assembly election
Party	Candidate	Votes	%
APC	Mudashiru Obasa		
APC hold			

=== Ikeja I ===
APC candidate Folajimi Mohammed won the election.

2015 Lagos State House of Assembly election
Party	Candidate	Votes	%
APC	Folajimi Mohammed		
APC hold			

=== Kosofe II ===
APC candidate Tunde Braimoh won the election.

2015 Lagos State House of Assembly election
Party	Candidate	Votes	%
APC	Tunde Braimoh		
APC hold			

=== Ikeja II ===
APC candidate Adedamola Kasumu won the election.

2015 Lagos State House of Assembly election
Party	Candidate	Votes	%
APC	Adedamola Kasumu		
APC hold			

=== Somolu II ===
APC candidate Abiru Rotimi Lateef won the election.

2015 Lagos State House of Assembly election
Party	Candidate	Votes	%
APC	Abiru Rotimi Lateef		
APC hold			

=== Badagry II ===
APC candidate Setonji David won the election.

2015 Lagos State House of Assembly election
Party	Candidate	Votes	%
APC	Setonji David		
APC hold			

=== Lagos Island II ===
APC candidate Giwa Sakirudeen won the election.

2015 Lagos State House of Assembly election
Party	Candidate	Votes	%
APC	Giwa Sakirudeen		
APC hold			

=== Epe I ===
APC candidate Tobun Abiodun won the election.

2015 Lagos State House of Assembly election
Party	Candidate	Votes	%
APC	Tobun Abiodun		
APC hold			

=== Epe II ===
APC candidate Segun Olulade won the election.

2015 Lagos State House of Assembly election
Party	Candidate	Votes	%
APC	Segun Olulade		
APC hold			

=== Eti-Osa I ===
APC candidate Alimi Kazeem Ademola won the election.

2015 Lagos State House of Assembly election
Party	Candidate	Votes	%
APC	Alimi Kazeem Ademola		
APC hold			

=== Eti-Osa II ===
APC candidate Yisawu Olusegun Gbolahan won the election.

2015 Lagos State House of Assembly election
Party	Candidate	Votes	%
APC	Yisawu Olusegun Gbolahan		
APC hold			

=== Ibeju/Lekki I ===
APC candidate Mojeed Fatai won the election.

2015 Lagos State House of Assembly election
Party	Candidate	Votes	%
APC	Mojeed Fatai		
APC hold			

=== Ibeju/Lekki II ===
APC candidate Kazeem Raheem Adewale won the election.

2015 Lagos State House of Assembly election
Party	Candidate	Votes	%
APC	Kazeem Raheem Adewale		
APC hold			

=== Ifako/Ijaye I ===
APC candidate Dayo Fafunmi won the election.

2015 Lagos State House of Assembly election
Party	Candidate	Votes	%
APC	Dayo Fafunmi		
APC hold			

=== Ifako/Ijaye II ===
APC candidate Makinde Rasheed Lanre won the election.

2015 Lagos State House of Assembly election
Party	Candidate	Votes	%
APC	Makinde Rasheed Lanre		
APC hold			

=== Ikorodu I ===
APC candidate Agunbiade Sanai won the election.

2015 Lagos State House of Assembly election
Party	Candidate	Votes	%
APC	Agunbiade Sanai		
APC hold			

=== Ikorodu II ===
APC candidate Solaja-Saka Nurudeen won the election.

2015 Lagos State House of Assembly election
Party	Candidate	Votes	%
APC	Solaja-Saka Nurudeen		
APC hold			

=== Kosofe I ===
APC candidate Osinowo Sikiru won the election.

2015 Lagos State House of Assembly election
Party	Candidate	Votes	%
APC	Osinowo Sikiru		
APC hold			

=== Lagos Island I ===
APC candidate Wasiu Sanni won the election.

2015 Lagos State House of Assembly election
Party	Candidate	Votes	%
APC	Wasiu Eshinlokun Sanni		
APC hold			

=== Lagos Mainland I ===
APC candidate Adekanye Oladele won the election.

2015 Lagos State House of Assembly election
Party	Candidate	Votes	%
APC	Adekanye Oladele		
APC hold			

=== Lagos Mainland II ===
APC candidate Oshun Moshood won the election.

2015 Lagos State House of Assembly election
Party	Candidate	Votes	%
APC	Oshun Moshood		
APC hold			

=== Mushin I ===
APC candidate Tejuoso Funmilayo won the election.

2015 Lagos State House of Assembly election
Party	Candidate	Votes	%
APC	Tejuoso Funmilayo		
APC hold			

=== Mushin II ===
APC candidate Olayiwola Olawale won the election.

2015 Lagos State House of Assembly election
Party	Candidate	Votes	%
APC	Olayiwola Olawale		
APC hold			

=== Ojo II ===
APC candidate Lanre Ogunyemi won the election.

2015 Lagos State House of Assembly election
Party	Candidate	Votes	%
APC	Lanre Ogunyemi		
APC hold			

=== Somolu I ===
APC candidate Rotimi Olowo won the election.

2015 Lagos State House of Assembly election
Party	Candidate	Votes	%
APC	Rotimi Olowo		
APC hold			

=== Surulere I ===
APC candidate Desmond Elliot won the election.

2015 Lagos State House of Assembly election
Party	Candidate	Votes	%
APC	Tijani Suraju		
APC hold			

=== Surulere II ===
PDP candidate Mosunmola Sangodara-Rotimi won the election.

2015 Lagos State House of Assembly election
Party	Candidate	Votes	%
PDP	Mosunmola Sangodara-Rotimi		
PDP hold			

=== Ajeromi/Ifelodun II ===
PDP candidate Oluwa Olatunji Fatai won the election.

2015 Lagos State House of Assembly election
Party	Candidate	Votes	%
PDP	Oluwa Olatunji Fatai		
PDP hold			

=== Ojo I ===
PDP candidate Olusegun Victor Akande won the election.

2015 Lagos State House of Assembly election
Party	Candidate	Votes	%
PDP	Olusegun Victor Akande		
PDP hold			

=== Oshodi/Isolo II ===
PDP candidate Emeka Odimogu won the election.

2015 Lagos State House of Assembly election
Party	Candidate	Votes	%
PDP	Emeka Odimogu		
PDP hold			

=== Oshodi/Isolo II ===
PDP candidate Shokunle Hakeem won the election.

2015 Lagos State House of Assembly election
Party	Candidate	Votes	%
PDP	Shokunle Hakeem		
PDP hold			

=== Amuwo/Odofin II ===
PDP candidate Hakeem Bello won the election.

2015 Lagos State House of Assembly election
Party	Candidate	Votes	%
PDP	Hakeem Bello		
PDP hold			

=== Amuwo/Odofin I ===
PDP candidate Dipo Olorunrinu won the election.

2015 Lagos State House of Assembly election
Party	Candidate	Votes	%
PDP	Dipo Olorunrinu		
PDP hold			

=== Ajeromi/Ifelodun I ===
PDP candidate Famakinwa Adedayo Olufemi won the election.

2015 Lagos State House of Assembly election
Party	Candidate	Votes	%
PDP	Famakinwa Adedayo Olufemi		
PDP hold			
