= 2019 Lagos State House of Assembly election =

- 9 March 2019

All 40 seats in the Lagos State House of Assembly 21 seats needed for a majority
	Majority party
Leader	Mudashiru Obasa
Party	APC
Leader's seat	Agege I
Last election	40
Seats after	40
Seat change	Steady
Speaker before election
Mudashiru Obasa
APC
Elected Speaker
Mudashiru Obasa
APC

The 2019 Lagos State House of Assembly election was held on 9 March 2019, to elect members of the Lagos State House of Assembly in Nigeria. All the 40 seats were up for election in the Lagos State House of Assembly. APC won all the 40 available seats.

Upon the opening of the 9th State House of Assembly, Mudashiru Obasa (APC-Agege I) was elected as Speaker of the House while Wasiu Sanni (APC-Lagos Island I) and Agunbiade Sanai (APC-Ikorodu I) became Deputy Speaker and House Leader, respectively.

== Results ==
=== Agege I ===
APC candidate Mudashiru Obasa won the election.

2019 Lagos State House of Assembly election
Party	Candidate	Votes	%
APC	Mudashiru Obasa		
APC hold			

=== Agege II ===
APC candidate Ogundiran Olayinka won the election.

2019 Lagos State House of Assembly election
Party	Candidate	Votes	%
APC	Ogundiran Olayinka		
APC hold			

=== Amuwo Odofin I ===
APC candidate Mojisola Alli-Macaulay won the election.

2019 Lagos State House of Assembly election
Party	Candidate	Votes	%
APC	Mojisola Alli-Macaulay		
APC hold			

=== Amuwo Odofin II ===
APC candidate Rauf Olawale won the election.

2019 Lagos State House of Assembly election
Party	Candidate	Votes	%
APC	Rauf Olawale		
APC hold			

=== Alimosho I ===
APC candidate Yusuf Adebisi won the election.

2019 Lagos State House of Assembly election
Party	Candidate	Votes	%
APC	Yusuf Adebisi		
APC hold			

=== Alimosho II ===
APC candidate Kehinde Joseph won the election.

2019 Lagos State House of Assembly election
Party	Candidate	Votes	%
APC	Kehinde Joseph		
APC hold			

=== Ajeromi/Ifelodun I ===
APC candidate Olumoh Lukman won the election.

2019 Lagos State House of Assembly election
Party	Candidate	Votes	%
APC	Olumoh Lukman		
APC hold			

=== Ajeromi Ifelodun II ===
APC candidate Olatunji Fatai won the election.

2019 Lagos State House of Assembly election
Party	Candidate	Votes	%
APC	Olatunji Fatai		
APC hold			

=== Apapa I ===
APC candidate Mojisola Meranda won the election.

2019 Lagos State House of Assembly election
Party	Candidate	Votes	%
APC	Mojisola Meranda		
APC hold			

=== Apapa II ===
APC candidate Olumuyiwa Jimoh won the election.

2019 Lagos State House of Assembly election
Party	Candidate	Votes	%
APC	Olumuyiwa Jimoh		
APC hold			

=== Badagry I ===
APC candidate Ibrahim Olanrewaju won the election.

2019 Lagos State House of Assembly election
Party	Candidate	Votes	%
APC	Ibrahim Olanrewaju		
APC hold			

=== Badagry II ===
APC candidate Setonji David won the election.

2019 Lagos State House of Assembly election
Party	Candidate	Votes	%
APC	Setonji David		
APC hold			

=== Epe I ===
APC candidate Mustairu Abiodun won the election.

2019 Lagos State House of Assembly election
Party	Candidate	Votes	%
APC	Mustairu Abiodun		
APC hold			

=== Epe II ===
APC candidate Ogunkelu Sylvester won the election.

2019 Lagos State House of Assembly election
Party	Candidate	Votes	%
APC	Ogunkelu Sylvester		
APC hold			

=== Eti Osa I ===
APC candidate Adams Babatunde won the election.

2019 Lagos State House of Assembly election
Party	Candidate	Votes	%
APC	Adams Babatunde		
APC hold			

=== Eti Osa II ===
APC candidate Yishawu Gbolahan won the election.

2019 Lagos State House of Assembly election
Party	Candidate	Votes	%
APC	Yishawu Gbolahan		
APC hold			

=== Ibeju Lekki I ===
APC candidate Mojeed Adebola won the election.

2019 Lagos State House of Assembly election
Party	Candidate	Votes	%
APC	Mojeed Adebola		
APC hold			

=== Ibeju Lekki II ===
APC candidate Kazeem Raheem won the election.

2019 Lagos State House of Assembly election
Party	Candidate	Votes	%
APC	Kazeem Raheem		
APC hold			

=== Ifako Ijaye I ===
APC candidate Adewale Temitope won the election.

2019 Lagos State House of Assembly election
Party	Candidate	Votes	%
APC	Adewale Temitope		
APC hold			

=== Ifako Ijaye II ===
APC candidate Makinde Rasheed won the election.

2019 Lagos State House of Assembly election
Party	Candidate	Votes	%
APC	Makinde Rasheed		
APC hold			

=== Ikeja I ===
APC candidate Folajimi Mohammed won the election.

2019 Lagos State House of Assembly election
Party	Candidate	Votes	%
APC	Folajimi Mohammed		
APC hold			

=== Ikeja II ===
APC candidate Adedamola Kasunmu won the election.

2019 Lagos State House of Assembly election
Party	Candidate	Votes	%
APC	Adedamola Kasunmu		
APC hold			

=== Kosofe I ===
APC candidate Sanni Babatunde won the election.

2019 Lagos State House of Assembly election
Party	Candidate	Votes	%
APC	Sanni Babatunde		
APC hold			

=== Kosofe II ===
APC candidate Olatunde Braimoh won the election.

2019 Lagos State House of Assembly election
Party	Candidate	Votes	%
APC	Olatunde Braimoh		
APC hold			

=== Ikorodu I ===
APC candidate Agunbiade Sanai won the election.

2019 Lagos State House of Assembly election
Party	Candidate	Votes	%
APC	Agunbiade Sanai		
APC hold			

=== Ikorodu II ===
APC candidate Solaja-Saka Nurudeen won the election.

2019 Lagos State House of Assembly election
Party	Candidate	Votes	%
APC	Solaja-Saka Nurudeen		
APC hold			

=== Lagos Mainland I ===
APC candidate Ibrahim Olatunbosun won the election.

2019 Lagos State House of Assembly election
Party	Candidate	Votes	%
APC	Ibrahim Olatunbosun		
APC hold			

=== Lagos Mainland II ===
APC candidate Moshood Olanrewaju won the election.

2019 Lagos State House of Assembly election
Party	Candidate	Votes	%
APC	Moshood Olanrewaju		
APC hold			

=== Mushin I ===
APC candidate Akinsanya Nureni won the election.

2019 Lagos State House of Assembly election
Party	Candidate	Votes	%
APC	Akinsanya Nureni		
APC hold			

=== Mushin II ===
APC candidate Saburi Olawale won the election.

2019 Lagos State House of Assembly election
Party	Candidate	Votes	%
APC	Saburi Olawale		
APC hold			

=== Ojo I ===
APC candidate Victor Akande won the election.

2019 Lagos State House of Assembly election
Party	Candidate	Votes	%
APC	Victor Akande		
APC hold			

=== Ojo II ===
APC candidate Tijani Suraju won the election.

2019 Lagos State House of Assembly election
Party	Candidate	Votes	%
APC	Tijani Suraju		
APC hold			

=== Lagos Island I ===
APC candidate Wasiu Sanni won the election.

2019 Lagos State House of Assembly election
Party	Candidate	Votes	%
APC	Wasiu Eshinlokun Sanni		
APC hold			

=== Lagos Island II ===
APC candidate Olanrewaju Afinni won the election.

2019 Lagos State House of Assembly election
Party	Candidate	Votes	%
APC	Olanrewaju Afinni		
APC hold			

=== Somolu I ===
APC candidate Oloworotimi Emmanuel won the election.

2019 Lagos State House of Assembly election
Party	Candidate	Votes	%
APC	Oloworotimi Emmanuel		
APC hold			

=== Somolu II ===
APC candidate Abiru Rotimi won the election.

2019 Lagos State House of Assembly election
Party	Candidate	Votes	%
APC	Abiru Rotimi		
APC hold			

=== Surulere I ===
APC candidate Desmond Elliott won the election.

2019 Lagos State House of Assembly election
Party	Candidate	Votes	%
APC	Desmond Elliott		
APC hold			

=== Surulere II ===
APC candidate Sangodara Mosunmola won the election.

2019 Lagos State House of Assembly election
Party	Candidate	Votes	%
APC	Sangodara Mosunmola		
APC hold			

=== Oshodi/Isolo I ===
APC candidate Sokunwe Hakeem won the election.

2019 Lagos State House of Assembly election
Party	Candidate	Votes	%
APC	Sokunwe Hakeem		
APC hold			

=== Oshodi/Isolo II ===
APC candidate Idumogu Emeka won the election.

2019 Lagos State House of Assembly election
Party	Candidate	Votes	%
APC	Idumogu Emeka		
APC hold			
