= Oshinowo =

Oshinowo is a surname. Notable people with the surname include:

- Babatunde Oshinowo (born 1983), American football player
- Nike Oshinowo (born 1966), Nigerian talk show host, entrepreneur, and style icon
- Oladosun Oshinowo (1941–2013), Nigerian lawyer and politician
- Tosin Oshinowo, Nigerian architect
- Adeniyi Adejimi Osinowo, 16th Commandant of the National Defence College
