= 4th Lagos State House of Assembly =

- Lagos State House of Assembly

Type
- Type: unicameral
- Term limits: 4 years

History
- Founded: October 2, 1979

Leadership
- Speaker of the Assembly: Rt. Hon. Adeleke Mamora since June 2, 1999
- Deputy Speaker: Hon. Adetoun Adediran since June 2, 1999
- Leader of the House: Farouk Adegboyega oshodi since June 2, 1999
- Deputy Leader: Hon. Olabanji Olayemi since June 2, 1999
- Chief Whip: Burahimo Yusuf

Structure
- Seats: 41
- Length of term: 4 years

Elections
- Voting system: Direct election
- Last election: June 1, 2003

Website
- The 4th Lagos State House of Assembly

The 4th Lagos State House of Assembly is the legislative branch of the Lagos State Government inaugurated on June 2, 1999, and the assembly ran its course till May 30, 2003. The assembly was unicameral with 41 representatives elected from each constituencies of the state. The Speaker of the 6th Legislative Assembly was Rt. Hon Adeleke Mamora and the Deputy speaker was Hon. Adetoun Adediran. The 5th Assembly was inaugurated on June 2, 2003, with the emergence of Adeyemi Ikuforiji as Speaker.
