= Famakinwa Adedayo Olufemi =

Nigerian politician

Hon. Famakinwa Adedayo Olufemi

Member, Lagos State House of Assembly
- In office 2015–2019
- Succeeded by: Olumoh Saad Lukman
- Constituency: Ajeromi-Ifelodun Constituency I

Personal details
- Born: January 1, 1967 (age 59)
- Party: All Progressives Congress
- Occupation: Politician

Famakinwa Adedayo Olufemi is a Nigerian politician who represented Ajeromi-Ifelodun Constituency I in the Lagos State House of Assembly from 2015 to 2019.

Olufemi contested to represent Ajeromi-Ifelodun Constituency I in the 8th Assembly, on the platform of the Peoples Democratic Party (PDP). He was one of the eight PDP candidates who secured victories in the 2015 Lagos State House of Assembly elections.

In 2017, he was among six lawmakers who defected from the PDP to the ruling All Progressives Congress (APC). He sought re-election in 2019 under the APC banner, however, he was not on the ballot as his candidacy became the subject of a legal battle.
