= 1st Lagos State House of Assembly =

- Lagos State House of Assembly

Type
- Type: unicameral
- Term limits: 4 years

History
- Founded: October 2, 1979

Leadership
- Speaker of the Assembly: Rt. Hon. Oladosun Oshinowo, Unity Party of Nigeria
- Deputy Speaker: Hon. Moshood Muse ariyoh, Unity Party of Nigeria
- Leader of the House: Hon. Lateef Babatunde Odunsi, Unity Party of Nigeria
- Chief Whip: Jimoh Adekoya Adams, Unity Party of Nigeria

Structure
- Seats: 41
- Length of term: 4 years

Elections
- Voting system: Direct election

Website
- 1st Lagos State House of Assembly

The 1st Lagos State House of Assembly is the legislative branch of the Lagos State Government inaugurated on October 2, 1979, the same year the Lagos State House of Assembly was founded. The assembly ran its course till October 5, 1983. The assembly was unicameral with 41 representatives elected from each constituencies of the state on the platform of the Unity Party of Nigeria. The Speaker of the 1st Legislative Assembly was Rt. Hon Oladosun Oshinowo and the Deputy speaker was Hon Moshood Muse. The 2nd Assembly was inaugurated on October 5, 1983, with the election of Oladimeji Longe as speaker.
