= Politics of Lagos State =

Lagos State operates a multi-party political system. The politics of Lagos State has been dominated by the All Progressives Congress since 1999 when Bola Tinubu became the first democratically elected governor of Lagos State, followed closely by the People's Democratic Party.

== Branches ==
Lagos State has a classic tripartite separation of powers system consisting of the executive, the legislature and the judiciary.

The executive is headed by the governor who exercises executive power upon his or her election. Headed by a Speaker, the legislature consists of a forty-member House of Assembly vested with legislative power while the judiciary through the Lagos State Judiciary is charged with the exercising of judicial power.

== See also ==
- Lagos State Government
- Olalekan Biliamin Onafeko
