= 8th Lagos State House of Assembly =

- Lagos State House of Assembly

Type
- Type: unicameral
- Term limits: 4 years

History
- Founded: October 2, 1979

Leadership
- Speaker of the Assembly: Rt. Hon. Mudashiru Obasa, All Progressives Congress (APC) since June 8, 2015
- Deputy Speaker: Eshinloku Sanni, All Progressives Congress, APC since June 8, 2015
- Leader of the House: Hon. Sanai Agunbiade, All Progressives Congress, APC since June 8, 2015
- Deputy Leader: Hon. Jimoh Wahab, All Progressives Congress, APC since June 8, 2015
- Chief Whip: Hon. Lateef Abiru, All Progressives Congress, APC
- Minority Leader: Akeem Bello, Peoples Democratic party (PDP) since June 8, 2015
- Deputy Chief Whip: Omotayo Oduntan, All Progressives Congress (APC) since June 8, 2015

Structure
- Seats: 41
- Length of term: 4 years

Elections
- Voting system: Direct election
- Last election: June 8, 2015

Website
- Lagos State House of Assembly

The 8th Lagos State House of Assembly is the legislative branch of the Lagos State Government inaugurated on June 8, 2015. The assembly will run its course till June 3, 2019. The assembly is unicameral with 41 representatives elected from each constituencies of the state. The incumbent Speaker of the 8th Legislative Assembly is Rt. Hon Mudashiru Obasa and the Deputy speaker is Hon. Eshinloku Sanni. The election of representative for the 8th legislative assembly was held on April 28, 2015.

== Powers and duties ==
The legislative function of the Assembly is to make law by passing bills, which must be endorsed by the two-thirds majority of the house. Following the endorsement by the two-thirds majority, the bill is presented to the Governor, who will sign the bill to become law. The assembly also play a significant role in the appointment of the state commissioners, Chief judges and other top official by the governor.
