= Politics of Akwa Ibom State =

Akwa Ibom State operates a multi-party political system. The politics of Akwa Ibom State has been dominated by the People's Democratic Party since 1999 when Victor Attah became the first democratically elected governor of Akwa Ibom State, followed closely by the All Progressives Congress.

== Branches ==
Akwa Ibom State has a classic tripartite separation of powers system consisting of the executive, the legislature and the judiciary.

The executive is headed by the governor who exercises executive power. Headed by a Speaker, the legislature consists of a twenty six-member House of Assembly vested with legislative power while the judiciary through the Akwa Ibom State Judiciary is charged with the exercising of judicial power.

== Corruption ==
Akwa Ibom is known for its Not in toleration of corruption in government. The electoral process of the state is said to be "Free and Fair" election and had been practiced accordingly except from few hindrances to the proper electoral and political process.
