= 3rd Lagos State House of Assembly =

- Lagos State House of Assembly

Type
- Type: unicameral
- Term limits: 4 years

History
- Founded: October 2, 1979

Leadership
- Speaker of the Assembly: Rt. Hon. Shakirudeen Kinyomi since January 14, 1992
- Deputy Speaker: Rasheed Adebolale Fashina since January 14, 1992
- Leader of the House: Adebayo T. Higara since January 14, 1992
- Deputy Leader: Hon. Babatunde Oduala since January 14, 1992
- Chief Whip: S. O Solaja

Structure
- Seats: 41
- Length of term: 4 years

Elections
- Voting system: Direct election
- Last election: June 1, 1999

Website
- The 3rd Lagos State House of Assembly

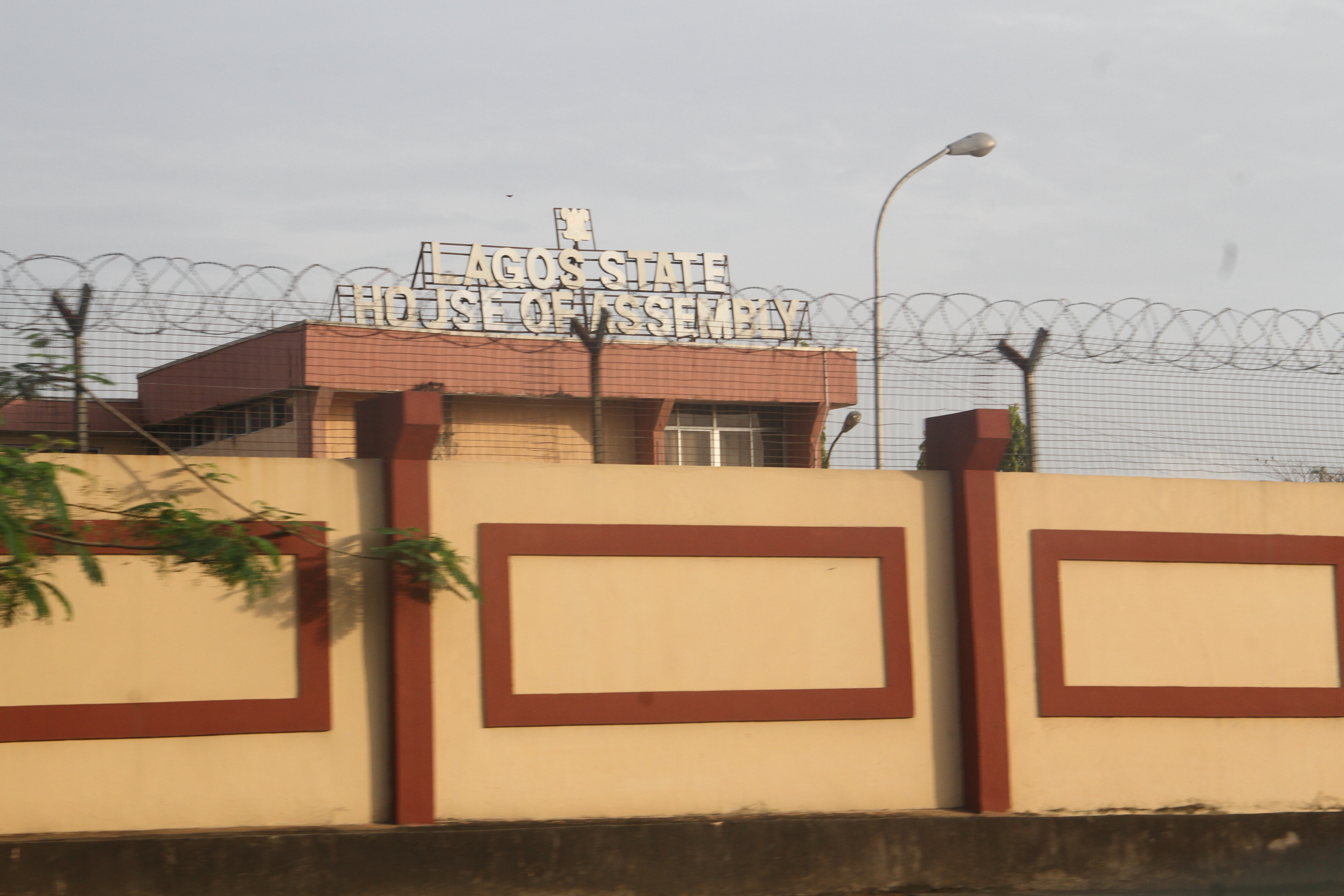
Lagos House of Assembly

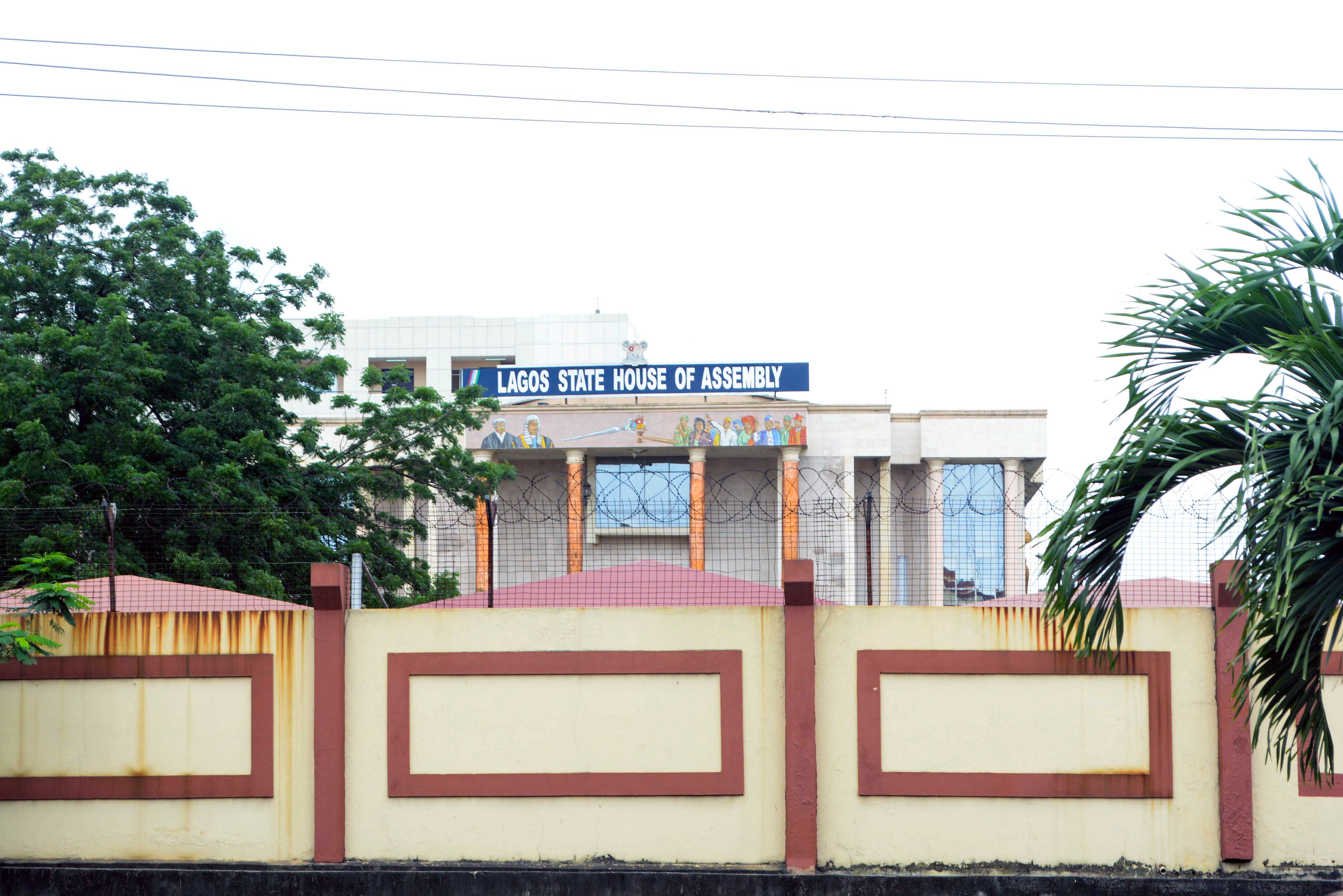
lagos state house of assembly

Lagos state house of assembly

The 3rd Lagos State House of Assembly is the legislative branch of the Lagos State Government inaugurated on January 14, 1992, and the assembly ran its course till June 1, 1999. The assembly was unicameral with 41 representatives elected from each constituencies of the state. The Speaker of the 3rd Legislative Assembly was Rt. Hon Shakirudeen Kinyomi and the Deputy speaker was Hon Rasheed Adebowale. The 4th Assembly was inaugurated on June 2, 2003, with the emergence of Adeleke Mamora as Speaker.
