= Samuel Ilesanmi Alade =

15th Commandant of the National Defence College (Nigeria)

Rear Admiral Samuel Ilesanmi Alade
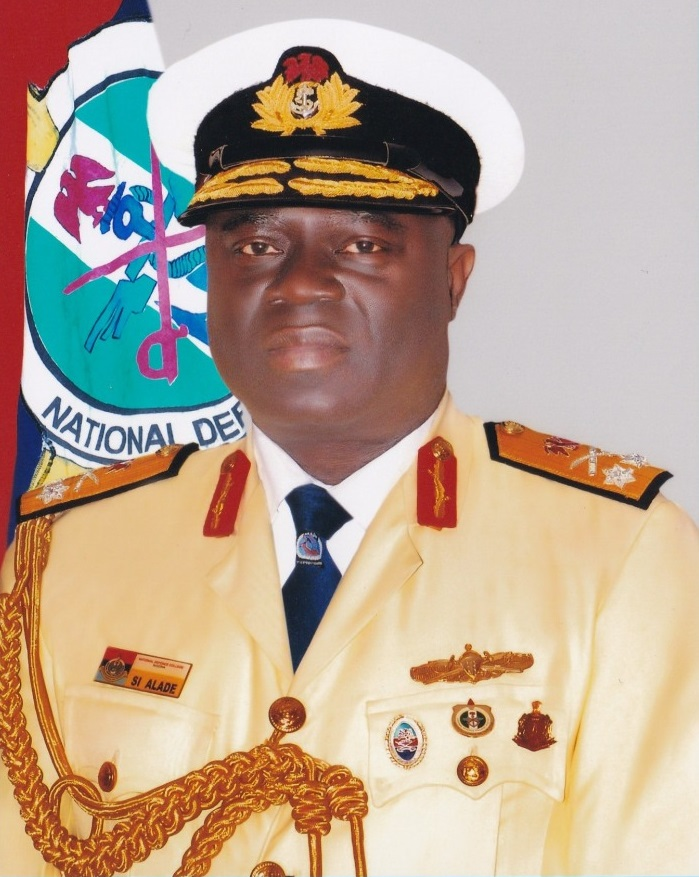
- Official portrait of the 15th Commandant of the National Defence College

15th Commandant of the National Defence College
- In office 8 October 2015 – 11 August 2017
- Preceded by: Patrick Agholor
- Succeeded by: Adeniyi Osinowo

Personal details
- Born: 18 March 1961 (age 65) Oyin Akoko, Western Region, Nigeria (now in Ondo State)
- Awards: Military Forces Service Star Meritorious Service Star, Distinguished Service Star, General Service Star, Staff Course Dagger.

Military service
- Allegiance: Nigeria
- Branch/service: Nigerian Navy
- Years of service: 1981–2017
- Rank: Rear Admiral
- Unit: Western Naval Command
- Commands: Flag Officer Commanding Western Naval Command Apapa, Chief of Navy Transformation at the Naval Headquarters Abuja; Commanding Officer of NNS EKPE; Executive Officer of NNS EKUN; Commanding Officer of Mogadishu, Abyssinia and Burma Battalions; Staff Officer Coordination at Nigerian Defence Academy, Kaduna; Chief Staff Officer at the Eastern Naval Command Calabar.
- Battles/wars: Liberian Civil War, Sierra Leone Civil War, Rwandan Civil War

Samuel Ilesanmi Alade (born 18 March 1961) is a retired Nigerian Navy admiral who was the 15th Commandant of the National Defence College, Abuja and the Flag Officer Commanding Western Naval Command, Apapa, Lagos, Nigeria. He is the Balogun of Akure.

== Education ==
Sanmi obtained primary education at St John's Primary School, Oyin Akoko, Ondo State and attended Secondary School at Ajuwa Grammar School, Okeagbe in Akoko North-West Local Government Area of Ondo State. He attended to the Nigerian Defence Academy, Kaduna, where he was trained to be an officer in the navy.

== Military institutions attended ==
From 1980 – 1981 Sanmi attended the Nigerian Defence Academy, Kaduna as a member of the 27 Regular Course and between 1984 and 1985 he attended the Indian Navy Ship VENDRUTHY, Cochin, India for Sub Lieutenant Technical Course. In 1990 he attended the Nigerian Navy Ship QUORRA, Apapa, Lagos for Long Navigation and Direction Course. In 1997 he attended the Nigerian Naval College, Onne, Port Harcourt for Principal Warfare Officers Course. In 1991 and 1996 Sanmi attended the Armed Forces Command and Staff College, Jaji, for the Junior and Senior Staff Courses respectively. He also attended the Maritime Warfare Centre, United Kingdom in 2002 for the International Joint Operations Planning Course and the National Defence College in 2008, New Delhi, India.

== Other institutions attended ==
In 1992 Sanmi attended University of Lagos, Akoka, where he obtained a Bachelor of Science Degree in Business Administration and in 1998 Masters of International Law and Diplomacy. In 2008 he attended University of Madras, India where he got a Master of Philosophy (M.Phil) and in 2012 he studied at Chattam House, London, where he enrolled in Strategic Management and Leadership.

== Appointments held ==
Samuel Alade served as a Watchkeeping Officer on various Nigerian Navy Ships (NNS) and patrol boats such as NNS BRASS, NNS ENYIMIRI and NNS ARADU between 1982 and 1985.

When he was transferred to Lagos he functioned as Commander of Lagos State Task Force on Environmental Sanitation covering Apapa zone which comprised present day Apapa, Lagos Island, Ajeromi, Orile, Amuwo-Odofin and Badagary areas of Lagos State between 1985 – 1986. In 1986 he served as Naval Assistant to the Minister of Employment; in 1986 -1987 as Flag Lieutenant to the Chief of the Naval Staff of the Nigerian Navy; in 1987 – 1988 as Naval Assistant to the Chief of Naval Staff; in 1988 – 1989 as Naval Assistant to the Chief of Defence Intelligence Service; in 1990 in Navigating Officer on board NNS AMBE.

In 1994 Samuel Alade served as Military Observer in the Economic Community of West African States Monitoring Group (ECOMOG) Operations in Liberia and Sierra Leone; and between 1994 and 1995 as Military Observer in the United Nations Mission in Rwanda. In 1995 and 1996 he was the Executive Officer of NNS EKUN and from 1997 and 1999 he served as Staff Officer (SOII) Grade II Training, SO1 Training and later Director of Plans at the Naval Headquarters Abuja.

From 2000 and 2002, Alade became the Commanding Officer of Mogadishu, Abyssinia and Burma Battalions of the Nigerian Defence Academy, Kaduna and in 2005 to 2006 he became the Commanding Officer of NNS EKPE. In 2009, he became the Chief Staff Officer at the Eastern Naval Command, Calabar. Between 2009 and 2010, he became Director of Coordination at the Nigerian Defence Academy, Kaduna; between 2002 and 2003 he became a Member of the Directing Staff, of the Armed Forces Command and Staff College, Jaji; between 2003 and 2005 he became Chief Instructor, Armed Forces Command and Staff College, Jaji.

He became Deputy Commandant at the Armed Forces Command and Staff College, Jaji, in 2012 and also Member of the Directing Staff of the National Defence College, Abuja, in 2010 – 2011.

In 2014, Sanmi became the Flag Officer Commanding Western Naval Command, Apapa, Lagos and in 2015 the Chief of Naval Transformation at the Naval Headquarters, Abuja. In October, 2015 he became the Commandant of the National Defence College, Abuja, the highest strategic military training institution in Nigeria for 22 months before his retirement from the Nigerian Navy on 31 August 2017.
