= Mojeed Fatai Adebola =

Nigerian politician

Deputy Speaker of the Lagos State House of Assembly
- In office 15 January 2025 – 3 March 2025
- Speaker: Mojisola Meranda
- Preceded by: Mojisola Meranda
- Succeeded by: Mojisola Meranda

Member of the Lagos State House of Assembly
- Incumbent
- Assumed office June 2019
- Constituency: Ibeju Lekki I

Personal details
- Party: All Progressive Congress (2013–present)
- Occupation: Politician

Mojeed Fatai Adebola is Nigerian politician. He currently serves as the state representative representing Ibeju Lekki I constituency at the Lagos State House of Assembly. On 13 January 2024, he was elected as the deputy speaker of the Lagos State House of Assembly, following the impeachment of the speaker, Mudashiru Obasa and subsequent election of Mojisola Meranda as speaker.
