= Omotayo =

- Gender: Unisex
- Language: Yoruba

Origin
- Meaning: 'Child that brings joy'
- Region of origin: Yorubaland [Nigeria, Benin, Togo]

Omotayo (Yoruba: Ọmọ́táyọ̀, pronounced [ɔ̄mɔ́tájɔ̀]), is a unisex given name of Yoruba origin, meaning 'child that brings joy'.

== Notable people with the name ==
- Tayo Adaramola (real name Omotayo Adaramola; born 2003), Irish footballer
- Omotayo Akinremi (born 1974), Nigerian former sprinter and hurdler
- Tayo Alasoadura (real name Omotayo Alasoadura; born 1949), Nigerian politician
- Omotayo Oduntan (born 1957), Nigerian politician

== See also ==
- Gold Omotayo (born 1994), Swiss professional footballer
- Olajide Omotayo (born 1995), Nigerian professional table tennis player
