= Adedamola (name) =

Nigerian given name

Adédàmọ́lá
- Gender: Masculine
- Language: Yoruba

Origin
- Language: Nigeria
- Meaning: Royalty/Crown mixed with wealth
- Region of origin: Southwest

Other names
- Short form: Dàmọ́lá

Adédàmọ́lá audio is a Yoruba given name for a male child in the Southwestern region of Nigeria, meaning "Royalty/crown has mixed with wealth". Adédàmọ́lá is diminutively spelt 'Dàmọ́lá'.

== Notable people bearing the name ==
- Adedamola Oyinlola Adefolahan, Nigerian Artist (Born February 1996)
- Adedamola Richard Kasunmu, Nigerian Politician
- Fireboy DML (Adedamola Oyinlola Adefolahan), Nigerian artiste
