= 2nd Lagos State House of Assembly =

- Lagos State House of Assembly

Type
- Type: unicameral
- Term limits: 4 years

History
- Founded: October 2, 1979

Leadership
- Speaker of the Assembly: Oladimeji Longe since October 6, 1983
- Deputy Speaker: Afolabi Oredoyin since October 6, 1983
- Leader of the House: Babatunde Odunsi since October 6, 1983
- Chief Whip: Moshud Ogunbekun

Structure
- Seats: 41
- Length of term: 4 years

Elections
- Voting system: Direct election
- Last election: January 10, 1992

Website
- The 2nd Lagos State House of Assembly

The 2nd Lagos State House of Assembly is the legislative branch of the Lagos State Government inaugurated on October 6, 1983, and the assembly ran its course till January 10, 1992. The assembly was unicameral with 41 representatives elected from each constituencies of the state. The Speaker of the 2nd Legislative Assembly was Rt. Hon Oladimeji Longe and the Deputy speaker was Hon Afolabi Oredoyin. The 3rd Assembly was inaugurated on January 14, 1992, with the emergence of Hon. Shakirudeen Kinyomi as Speaker.
