= 6th Lagos State House of Assembly =

- Lagos State House of Assembly

Type
- Type: unicameral
- Term limits: 4 years

History
- Founded: October 2, 1979

Leadership
- Speaker of the Assembly: Rt. Hon. Adeyemi Ikuforiji since June 4, 2007
- Deputy Speaker: Hon. Bola Badmus Olujobi since June 4, 2007
- Leader of the House: Hon. Kolawole Taiwo Musibau since June 4, 2007
- Deputy Leader: Hon. Avoseh Hodewu Suru since June 4, 2007
- Chief Whip: Hon. Abdulrazak Mobolaji

Structure
- Seats: 41
- Length of term: 4 years

Elections
- Voting system: Direct election
- Last election: July 4, 2011

Website
- The 6th Lagos State House of Assembly

The 6th Lagos State House of Assembly is the legislative branch of the Lagos State Government inaugurated on June 4, 2007 and the assembly ran its course till July 4, 2011. The assembly was unicameral with 41 representatives elected from each constituencies of the state. The Speaker of the 6th Legislative Assembly was Rt. Hon Adeyemi Ikuforiji and the Deputy speaker was Hon. Bola Badmus Olujobi.

== Powers and duties ==
The legislative function of the 6th Assembly is to make law by passing bills, which must be endorsed by the two-thirds majority of the house. Following the endorsement by the two-thirds majority, the bill is presented to the Governor, who will sign the bill to become law. The assembly assess and approve the annual budget of the state government on presentation by the governor. The assembly also play a significant role in the appointment of the state commissioners, chief judges and other top official by the governor, Fashola.
