= Lawal Aina Musibau =

Nigerian politician

Hon. Lawal Aina Musibau

Member, Lagos State House of Assembly
- Incumbent
- Assumed office 2023
- Constituency: Apapa Constituency II

Personal details
- Party: All Progressives Congress (APC)
- Occupation: Politician
- Website: Lagos Assembly Profile

Lawal Aina Musibau is a Nigerian politician who currently serves as a member of the Lagos State House of Assembly, representing Apapa Constituency II. He is the Chairman of the House Committee on Health.

== Political career ==
Lawal Aina Musibau participated in the 2023 general elections, contesting for the seat of Apapa Constituency II. He ran on the platform of the All Progressives Congress (APC) and was successful, securing a mandate to represent his constituents in the 10th Legislative Assembly of Lagos State. He is a first-term lawmaker.

After the inauguration of the 10th Assembly, he was appointed as the Chairman of the House Committee on Health. He is responsible for legislative oversight of the Lagos State Ministry of Health, the Lagos State Health Management Agency (LASHMA), and primary healthcare centres across the state. The committee works to oversee the implementation of the state's health policies and the improvement of medical infrastructure.

He has been involved in inspecting health facilities to monitor the quality of healthcare delivery and government-sponsored medical interventions such as free surgery programs.
