= 7th Lagos State House of Assembly =

- Lagos State House of Assembly

Type
- Type: unicameral
- Term limits: 4 years

History
- Founded: 2 October 1979

Leadership
- Speaker of the Assembly: Rt. Hon. Adeyemi Ikuforiji, All Progressives Congress (APC) since 4 June 2011
- Deputy Speaker: Musibau Kolawole Taiwo, All Progressives Congress (APC) since 4 June 2011
- Leader of the House: Hon. Ajibayo adeyeye, All Progressives Congress (APC) since 4 June 2011
- Deputy Leader: Hon. Lola Fibisola Akande, All Progressives Congress (APC) since 4 June 2011
- Chief Whip: Hon. Abdulrazak Balogun, All Progressives Congress (APC)

Structure
- Seats: 40
- Length of term: 4 years

Elections
- Voting system: Direct election
- Last election: 28 April 2011

Website
- Lagoss State House of Assembly

The 7th Lagos State House of Assembly was the legislative branch of the Lagos State Government inaugurated on 4 June 2011. The assembly ran its course till 3 June 2015. The assembly is unicameral with 40 representatives elected from each constituencies of the state. The Speaker of the 7th Legislative Assembly was Rt. Hon Adeyemi Ikuforiji and the Deputy speaker was Hon. Musibau Kolawole Taiwo. The election of representative for the 8th legislative assembly was held on 28 April 2015.

== Powers and duties ==
The legislative function of the Assembly is to make law by passing bills, which must be endorsed by the two-thirds majority of the house. Following the endorsement by the two-thirds majority, the bill is presented to the Governor, who will sign the bill to become law. The assembly assess and approve the annual budget of the state government on presentation by the governor. The assembly also play a significant role in the appointment of the state commissioners, Chief judges and other top official by the governor.
