= Adeniyi Adejimi Osinowo =

16th Commandant of the National Defence College (Nigeria)

Rear Admiral Adeniyi Adejimi Osinowo GSS
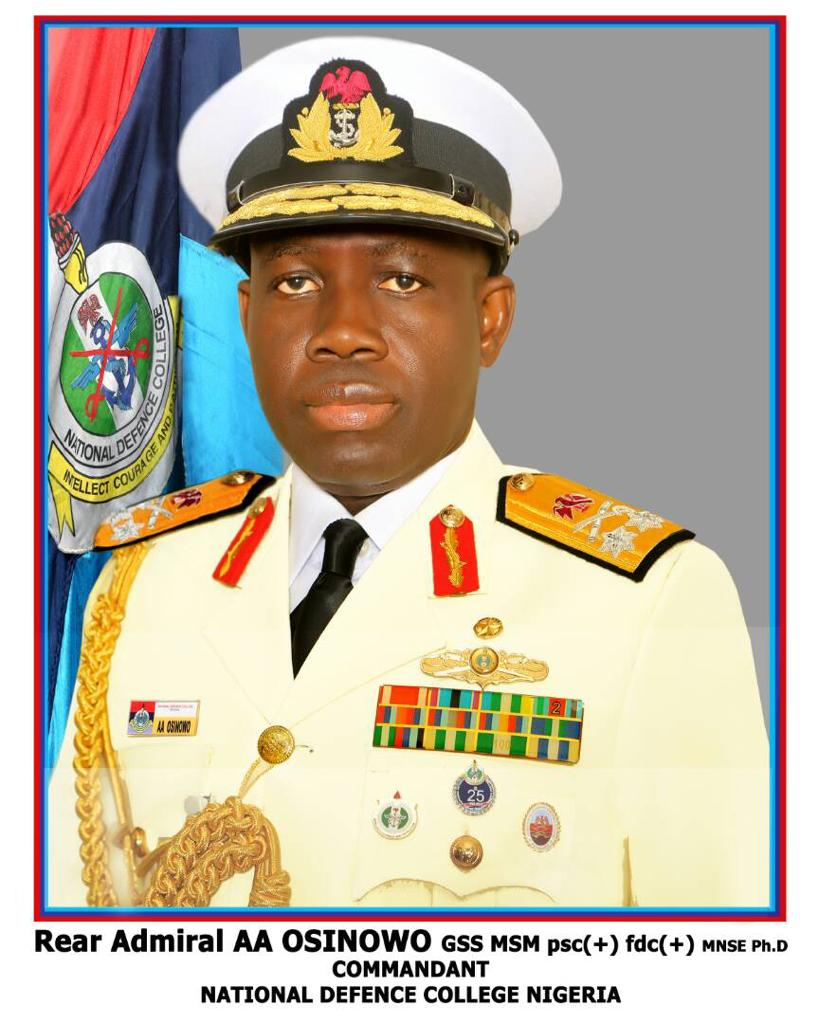
- Official portrait of the 16th Commandant of the National Defence College

16th Commandant of the National Defence College
- In office 11 August 2017 – 4 March 2019
- Preceded by: Samuel Ilesanmi Alade
- Succeeded by: Mackson Kadiri

Personal details
- Born: 8 November 1964 (age 61) Ibadan, Western Region, Nigeria (now in Oyo State)
- Education: Nigerian Naval College

Military service
- Allegiance: Nigeria
- Branch/service: Nigerian Navy
- Years of service: 1981–2019
- Rank: Rear Admiral

Adeniyi Adejimi Osinowo GSS (born November 8, 1964) is a retired Nigerian Navy admiral who was the 16th commandant of the National Defence College, Abuja.

== Early life ==
Adejimi was born on November 8, 1964, in Ibadan, Nigeria. His parents were George Adekite Osinowo, a former chief magistrate, and Esther Osinowo, a teacher. The Osinowo family of descended from the Odoru ruling house of Iperu, Ogun State.

He received his early education in Ibadan before attending Ijebu Ode Grammar School between 1975 and 1980.

== Military career ==
Adejimi started his military career in 1981 at the Nigerian Naval College and served for 38 years before retiring in March 2019.

Adejimi graduated from Obafemi Awolowo University in 1991 with a First-class honors degree in electronic and electrical engineering. He later took a master's degree in electrical engineering (University of Lagos 1991–93), a post-graduate diploma in international relations and strategic studies (Lagos State University 1999–2000), a master's degree in international affairs and diplomacy (Ahmadu Bello University 2001–02), and a post-graduate diploma in education at the National Open University 2018–19. He completed a post-graduate diploma in strategy and innovation at the University of Oxford Saïd Business School between March 2021 and April 2022.

Adejimi served on many ships in the Nigerian Navy, and eventually took command of Nigerian Navy ship SIRI (2005–06), and had operational deployments with various navies in the Gulf of Guinea, the Caribbean and the Mediterranean. During 2009 and 2010, he served on US Navy Ship Gunston Hall as deputy commander of the multi-national Africa partnership station mission.

Adejimi was ith the United Nations peace forces in former Yugoslavia (1994–95), and in the Nigerian Navy, was commanding officer of the naval drafting command (2005), director of marine services (2007–08), director of staff at the armed forces command and staff college (2001–03) and national defense dollege (2012–13).

He managed the Nigerian Navy transformation plan from 2011 to 2020, and helped to develop the African Union commission's integrated maritime strategy from 2010 and 2013. He was Flag Officer of the naval training command (2015–16), chief of training and operations at naval headquarters, (2016–17), and as the 16th commandant of the National Defense College from 2017 to 2019.

== Awards ==
Adejimi received the general service star and a United Nations operations medal (UNPROFOR/UNPF). He was awarded the Humanitarian Service Medal by the U.S. Navy in 2010 and the meritorious service medal by the presidentBarack Obama in 2011.

== Post-military engagements ==
In June 2020, Adejimi was appointed as chair of the board of directors of Dominion Trust Limited (DTL), a stockbroking house in the Nigerian capital market.

After completing a diploma at Oxford University Said Business School, he established a business focused on promoting modern methods of construction in the United Kingdom.

== Publications ==
- Osinowo, Adeniyi Adejimi (2011) Africa Partnership Station Helps All Sides U.S. Naval Institute Magazine, July 2011.
- Osinowo, Adeniyi Adejimi (2015) Combating Piracy in the Gulf of Guinea. Africa Security Brief, no. 30, pages 1–8.
- Commander Adeniyi Adejimi Osinowo (2005) The Royal Australian Navy in the Twenty First Century- Strategic Thoughts. Sea Power Centre - Australia - Peter Mitchell Essays 2003, pages 17- 25.
