= 5th Lagos State House of Assembly =

- Lagos State House of Assembly

Type
- Type: unicameral
- Term limits: 4 years

History
- Founded: October 2, 1979

Leadership
- Speaker of the Assembly: Rt. Hon. Adeyemi Ikuforiji since June 2, 2003
- Deputy Speaker: Hon. Farouk Adegboyega Oshodi since June 2, 2003
- Leader of the House: Hon. Babajide Omoworare since June 2, 2003
- Deputy Leader: Hon. Balogun Abour Mobolaji since June 2, 2003
- Chief Whip: Hon. Olabanji Olayemi Olateju

Structure
- Seats: 41
- Length of term: 4 years

Elections
- Voting system: Direct election
- Last election: June 2, 2007

Website
- The 5th Lagos State House of Assembly

The 5th Lagos State House of Assembly is the legislative branch of the Lagos State Government inaugurated on June 2, 2003 and the assembly ran its course till July 2, 2007. The assembly was unicameral with 41 representatives elected from each constituencies of the state. The Speaker of the 5th Legislative Assembly was Rt. Hon Adeyemi Ikuforiji and the Deputy speaker was Hon. Farouk Adegboyega Oshodi.
