= Risikat Ajoke Adegeye =

Nigerian politician

Member of the Lagos State House of Assembly
- In office 2011–2015
- Constituency: Amuwo-Odofin I

Personal details
- Died: 21 September 2021 Nigeria
- Party: Action Congress of Nigeria; later All Progressives Congress
- Spouse: Sunday Adeniyi Adegeye (King Sunny Adé)
- Children: 6
- Occupation: Politician

Risikat Ajoke Adegeye was a Nigerian politician, who served as a Member in the 6th Assembly of the Lagos State House of Assembly.

== Career ==
Ajoke was an Adegeye was a former chairmanship aspirant under the platform of All Progressives Congress in Amuwo Odofin Local Government Area, and a member of the 6th Assembly of the Lagos State House of Assembly, representing Amuwo-Odofin at the Lagos State House of Assembly between 2011 and 2015.

== Personal life ==
She was married to Chief Sunday Adeniyi Adegeye, also known as King Sunny Ade, and a mother to George Olawande Adegeye.

== Death ==
Risikat died on 21 September 2021, after a brief sickness.
