= Ansar-Ud-Deen College Offa =

Public secondary school in Offa, Kwara State, Nigeria

Ansar-Ud-Deen College, Offa
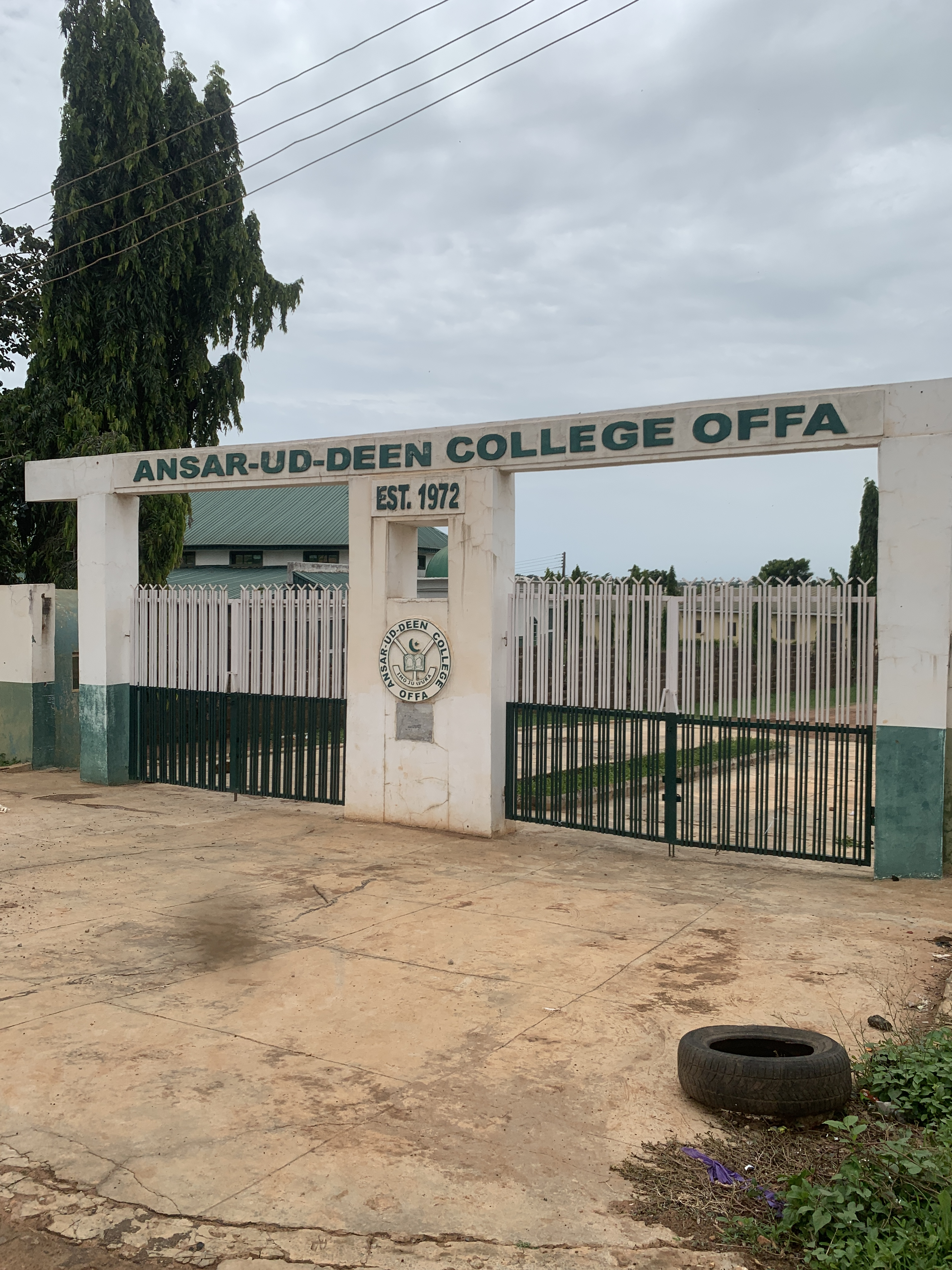

Location
- Offa, Kwara State; Nigeria; 8.1461°N 4.7005°E

Information
- Other name: AUD
- School type: Public secondary school
- Religious affiliation: Originally established by the Ansar-Ud-Deen Society
- Denomination: Islam
- Established: 1972
- Founder: Ansar-Ud-Deen Society
- Status: Active
- School district: Offa
- Local authority: Kwara State Ministry of Education and Human Capital Development
- Grades: Junior and Senior Secondary
- Gender: Co-educational
- Campus type: Urban
- Nickname: AUD

Ansar-Ud-Deen College, Offa (AUD) is a public secondary school in Offa, Kwara State, Nigeria. Established in 1972 by the Ansar-Ud-Deen Society of Nigeria, the school later became part of the Kwara State Government's public secondary school system following the state's takeover of mission and voluntary agency schools.

The college is one of several secondary schools established by the Ansar-Ud-Deen Society to expand access to modern education integrated with Islamic values in south-western Nigeria.

The school regularly participates in academic, sporting and co-curricular competitions organised within Kwara State, including the Kwara State Internal Revenue Service (KWIRS) annual tax quiz competition.

== History ==
Ansar-Ud-Deen College, Offa was established in 1972 by the Ansar-Ud-Deen Society of Nigeria as part of the society's expansion of secondary education across Yorubaland. Like many mission and voluntary agency schools in Kwara State, it was subsequently taken over by the state government during the education reforms of the 1970s while retaining its historical identity.

The college serves students from Offa and neighbouring communities and forms part of the network of public secondary schools administered by the Kwara State Ministry of Education.

== Academics ==
The school offers junior and senior secondary education in accordance with the curriculum prescribed by the Nigerian educational system and prepares students for the Basic Education Certificate Examination (BECE) and the West African Senior School Certificate Examination (WASSCE).

== Activities ==
Students participate in academic competitions, debates, sports and cultural activities. In 2025, the school qualified for the final stage of the Kwara State Internal Revenue Service tax quiz competition.

== Notable alumni ==
- Professor Babatunde Lawal Salako, physician and Director-General of the Nigerian Institute of Medical Research (NIMR).
- Wasiu Eshinlokun-Sanni, Nigerian politician, Senator representing Lagos Central Senatorial District and former Deputy Speaker of the Lagos State House of Assembly.

== See also ==
- Ansar-Ud-Deen Society
- Education in Nigeria
- Offa, Nigeria
