= Ekemode =

Ekemode is a surname. Notable people with the surname include:

- Mustapha Ekemode (c. 1898–?), Nigerian Islamic preacher
- Orlando Julius Aremu Olusanya Ekemode (1943–2022), Nigerian singer and musician
