= Femi Saheed =

Nigerian Politician

Member, Lagos State House of Assembly
- Incumbent
- Assumed office December 5, 2020
- Preceded by: Tunde Braimoh
- Constituency: Kosofe Constituency II

Personal details
- Born: Wasiu Obafemi Saheed; September 12, 1972 (age 54) Lagos State, Nigeria
- Party: All Progressives Congress (APC)
- Education: Ambrose Alli University University of Calabar Lagos State University Ahmadu Bello University
- Occupation: Politician, Banker
- Website: Lagos Assembly Profile

Wasiu Obafemi Saheed, commonly known as Femi Saheed, is a Nigerian politician and banker who currently serves as a member of the Lagos State House of Assembly, representing Kosofe Constituency II. He was first elected during a by-election in December 2020, following the death of the incumbent, Tunde Braimoh. He is a member of the All Progressives Congress (APC) and currently chairs the House Committee on Finance.

== Early life and education ==
Femi Saheed was born on September 12, 1972. He attended Itire Primary School, Lagos, obtaining his First School Leaving Certificate in 1986. He proceeded to Government College, Kaduna, for his secondary education, graduating in 1992. He holds a B.Sc. in Economics from Ambrose Alli University (2007), and a B.Sc. in Environmental Resource Management from the University of Calabar. He also earned an MBA from the University of Calabar (2007), an M.Sc. in Environmental Science from Lagos State University (2019), and a Master’s degree in International Law and Diplomacy (MIAD) from Ahmadu Bello University (2024). B.Sc. Economics from Ambrose Alli University (2007). He is a certified member of the Chartered Institute of Loans and Risk Management of Nigeria (CILRM).

== Career ==
=== Professional Career ===
Prior to entering active legislative politics, Saheed had a career in the banking and finance sector spanning over two decades. His professional history includes: Head of Enterprise and Rural Banking (Northern Region) at Integrated Micro Finance Bank Plc (2007), the first licensed microfinance bank in Nigeria. Chief Operating Officer at Mayfield Finance Limited (2008–2009).

=== Political Career ===
Femi Saheed began his political involvement in the Fourth Republic. In 1999, he was appointed as the Ward Youth Leader for the Alliance for Democracy (AD) in Ward F, Ikosi-Isheri Local Council Development Area (LCDA).

He rose through the party ranks within the Action Congress (AC), Action Congress of Nigeria (ACN), and eventually the All Progressives Congress (APC). He served as the State Assistant General Secretary of the Lagos State APC from 2013 to 2020. Between 2017 and 2019, he also served as the Acting State Secretary of the party. Following the death of the lawmaker representing Kosofe Constituency II, Tunde Braimoh, in July 2020, a by-election was conducted by the Independent National Electoral Commission (INEC) on December 5, 2020. Saheed contested as the APC candidate and won, polling 12,494 votes to defeat his closest rival, Sikiru Alebiosu of the Peoples Democratic Party (PDP), who polled 2,068 votes.

He was re-elected in the 2023 general elections. In the 10th Assembly, he was appointed Chairman of the House Committee on Finance. In this capacity, he has advocated for the establishment of a Lagos State Wealth Fund to manage the state's equity investments and ensure financial stability.
