= Olalekan Biliamin Onafeko =

Nigerian legislative administrator

Clerk of the Lagos State House of Assembly
- Incumbent
- Assumed office 2022

Personal details
- Occupation: Legislative administrator; civil servant

Olalekan Biliamin Onafeko is a Nigerian legislative administrator who serves as the Clerk of the Lagos State House of Assembly since January 14, 2022, the principal administrative and procedural officer of the legislature.

He gained national attention in 2025 following a legal dispute arising from his suspension and subsequent reinstatement during a leadership crisis within The Lagos State House of Assembly.

== Career ==
Onafeko was appointed Clerk of the Lagos State House of Assembly in 2022. In this role, he oversees the administrative machinery of the Assembly, provides procedural advice to lawmakers, coordinates legislative documentation and serves as the accounting officer of the Assembly bureaucracy.

== 2025 suspension and legal challenge ==
In January 2025, Onafeko was suspended indefinitely by the Lagos State House of Assembly amid a political crisis that followed the removal of Speaker Mudashiru Obasa.

Following the suspension, he instituted legal proceedings at the National Industrial Court of Nigeria, challenging the legality of the decision and seeking to restrain the appointment of an acting clerk.

In February 2025, the court ordered that the status quo be maintained pending the determination of the suit, effectively allowing Onafeko to resume his official functions. His return to duty generated mixed reactions within the Assembly with lawmakers expressing differing views on the implications of the court ruling for legislative administration.

== See also ==
- Lagos State House of Assembly
- National Industrial Court of Nigeria
- Politics of Lagos State
