= Jubreel Abdulkareem =

Nigerian politician

Hon. Jubreel Ayodeji Abdulkareem

Member of the Lagos State House of Assembly
- Incumbent
- Assumed office 2023
- Constituency: Agege Constituency 2

Executive Chairman, Agege
- In office 2008–2022
- Constituency: Agege Local Government

Supervisor for Health and Environmental Services, Agege Local Government
- In office 2000–2007

Personal details
- Born: Jubreel Ayodeji Abdulkareem Agege, Lagos State, Nigeria
- Citizenship: Nigerian
- Party: All Progressives Congress
- Other political affiliations: Action Congress; Accord
- Education: Olabisi Onabanjo University
- Occupation: Politician, lawmaker, teacher
- Profession: Educationist, public administrator

Jubreel Ayodeji Abdulkareem is a Nigerian politician who represents Agege Constituency 2 in the Lagos State House of Assembly.

== Early life and education ==
Jubreel Ayodeji Abdulkareem was born in Agege, Lagos State, to Alhaji and Alhaja Abdul Kareem. He attended Bishop Oluwole Memorial Primary School, Agege, from 1971 to 1977. He subsequently enrolled at the Islamic Institute, Markaz Agege, where he completed both the lower and higher school certificate programmes between 1977 and 1984. He later studied at Olabisi Onabanjo University, Ago-Iwoye, earning a bachelor's degree (BSc) in Cooperatives and Business Management from 2005 to 2008.

== Career ==
Abdulkareem began his career as a teacher at Oke‑Ira Grammar School before moving to Agidingbi Grammar School, Ikeja, where he taught Arabic and Islamic Studies from 1984 to 1990. He later worked in the private sector, first as a sales representative and then as a manager at Draco Nigeria Limited between 1990 and 1991.

=== Political career ===
Abdulkareem entered politics in 1998. In 2000, he was appointed Supervisor for Health and Environmental Services in Agege Local Government.

He was elected Executive Chairman of Agege Local Government Area in 2008 under the Action Congress (AC).

In 2019, he contested for a seat in the Lagos State House of Assembly representing Agege Constituency under the Accord Party (AP), but later withdrew.

He was later elected in 2023 to represent Agege Constituency 2 in the Lagos State House of Assembly under the All Progressives Congress.
