= Babatunde Lawal Salako =

Nigeria academic and author

- Born: 23 July 1959 (age 67)
- Citizenship: Nigeria
- Education: University of Ibadan
- Employers: University Of Ibadan; Nigerian Institute of Medical Research, Yaba, Lagos
- Title: Professor
- Website: Profile at University of Ibadan

Professor Babatunde Lawal Salako (born 23 July 1959) is a Nigerian professor and author who is the Director-General of the Nigerian Institute of Medical Research, Yaba Lagos. Salako previously served as the first medical director at the University College Hospital, Ibadan, from 1978 to 1984.

== Early life and education ==
Salako was born on 23 July 1959 to the Salako family of 18 children in Sango Ota in Ogun State with Salako being the last.

Salako attended Ansar Ud-Deen Practising School and Ansar-Ud-Deen College Offa for his Senior Secondary School certificate before proceeding to Kwara State College of Technology Ilorin and earned his Degree at University of Ibadan.

== Career ==
Salako was employed by the University of Ibadan, he served as Professor of Nephrology at the College of Medicine and held the positions of Honorary Consultant Physician. Salako was the pioneer medical director of University College Hospital, Ibadan from 1978 to 1984 and served as the provost of the College of Medicine from 2014 to 2016.

Salako is the current director-general of the Nigerian Institute of Medical Research.

== Membership ==
He is a member of Nigerian Academy of Science, International Society on Hypertension in Blacks, African Society of Human Genetics, International Society of Nephrology, Global Forum for Health Research, and World Heart Federation. He is a fellow for the residency training in department of Medicine at University of Ibadan.

== Publications ==
- Health-related quality of life among children/adolescents living with HIV/AIDS in Lagos State, Nigeria.
- Diabetic nephropathy--a review of the natural history, burden, risk factors and treatment.
- A meta-analysis identifies new loci associated with body mass index in individuals of African ancestry
- Seroprevalence of SARS-CoV-2 IgG among healthcare workers in Lagos, Nigeria.
- Empowerment Through Skill Acquisition and Its Impact on ART Adherence Among HIV-Positive Adults in Lagos, Nigeria during the COVID-19 Pandemic
- Assessment of global kidney health care status.
- Blood pressure, hypertension and correlates in urbanised workers in Ibadan, Nigeria: a revisit
- Global kidney health atlas (GKHA): design and methods
