= Sabur Akanbi Oluwa =

Nigerian politician

The Honourable Oluwa Sabur Akanbi

Member of the Lagos State House of Assembly
- Incumbent
- Assumed office 18 March 2023

Member of the Lagos State House of Assembly from Ajeromi Ifelodun Local Government
- Incumbent
- Assumed office 18 March 2023
- Constituency: Ajeromi Ifelodun II

Personal details
- Born: 13 January 1987 (age 39) Ajeromi-Ifelodun, Ajeromi-Ifelodun Local Government Lagos State Nigeria
- Party: All Progressive Congress
- Education: Lagos State University
- Alma mater: Lagos State University
- Occupation: Politician; Project Manager; Administrator

Sabur Akanbi Oluwa is a Nigerian politician representing Ajeromi-Ifelodun Constituency II in the Lagos State House of Assembly.

== Early life ==
Sabur Akanbi Oluwa was born in 1987 in Lagos State. He spent his childhood and completed his education in Lagos State.

== Career ==
Oluwa has worked in both the public and private sectors. He is currently a member of the Lagos State House of Assembly, representing his constituency. He previously served as a legislative officer in the Lagos State House of Assembly for seven years, from 2012 to 2019.

=== Political career ===
Oluwa has been a member of the Lagos State House of Assembly since 2023, representing Ajeromi-Ifelodun Constituency II. He was sworn in alongside 39 other members of the Assembly by the Governor of Lagos State, Babajide Sanwo-Olu.
