= Omotayo Oduntan =

Nigerian politician

Deputy Chief Whip of 8th Lagos State House of Assembly
- Incumbent
- Assumed office August 6, 2015
- Preceded by: Rotimi Abiru
- Constituency: Alimosho II

Personal details
- Born: Omotayo Aramide Oduntan; June 5, 1957 (age 69) Lagos State, Nigeria
- Party: All Progressives Congress
- Occupation: Politician

Omotayo Aramide Oduntan (born June 5, 1957), is a Nigerian politician representing Alimosho II Constituency at the Lagos State House of Assembly under the platform of the All Progressives Congress.

== Life and career ==
She was born in Lagos State, Southwestern Nigeria, where she completed her primary and secondary school education. She holds a certificate and diploma in Food Hygiene and Food Handling from the Royal Institute of Public Health. She once served as the Senior Special Assistant to the Governor of Lagos State on Grassroot Matters while serving as a member of Lagos State House of Assembly from 1999 to 2003 and from 2011 to 2015. She presently serves as the Chief Whip of the 8th Assembly of the Lagos State House of Assembly.
