= Mackson Kadiri =

Rear Admiral Mackson Kadiri
- Military career
- Allegiance: Nigeria
- Branch: Nigerian Navy
- Service years: 1988–2021
- Rank: Rear Admiral
- Unit: National Defence College
- Commands: Chief of Training and Operations, Naval Headquarters; National Defence College, Nigeria (2019–2021)

Rear Admiral Makanju Mackson Kadiri, Gss, psc, fdc, is a retired Nigerian Navy officer who served as the commandant of the National Defence College, Nigeria from 2019 until his retirement on 30 March 2021. He was succeeded by Rear Admiral Oladele Bamidele Daji. He previously served as the Chief of Training and Operations at Naval headquarters, Abuja from 2018 to 2019.

He attended the senior staff course at the Marine Safety Course U.S, Armed Forces Command and Staff College, Jaji, United States Coast Guard Training Centre and the United Nations Administration and Logistic Course in the International Peace Support Centre Nairobi, he also obtained a master's degree in political science.

Kadiri was enlisted into the Navy in 1988 as a Regular Combatant of the rank Sub-lieutenant. He became Rear Admiral in 2015 after attending several professional academic courses.

Kadiri served on the Nigeria Navy Ships; the Ambe, Agu, Ofiom and RuwanYaro. He was a commanding officer of the Forward Operating Base, directing staff of the Armed Forces Command and Staff College and the National Defence College Nigeria. He had served in the Maritime Warfare at the Armed Forces Command and Staff College as a department director and was also Navy Secretary at the Naval Headquarters, Abuja. He also attended many international conferences, he was a Senior Leader at the 2016 Gulf of Guinea Commission Summit Malabo, Symposium Abidjan in 2017 and the 2018 Gulf of Guinea Navies Summit, Paris.
