= George Adegeye =

Nigerian businessman and politician

Member of the House of Representatives of Nigeria for Amuwo Odofin
- Incumbent
- Assumed office June 2023
- Preceded by: Oghene Egoh

Personal details
- Party: LP
- Relations: King Sunny Ade (Father)
- Occupation: businessman; Legislature

George Folarin Adegeye is a Nigerian businessman and politician who is serving in the 10th and current House of Representatives. He is also known as Omo Geye. He emerged as a member of the House of Representatives under Labour Party pulling a total of 46,702 votes to defeat Prince Lanre Sanusi of the All Progressives Congress (APC), who scored 12,946 votes, followed by the People's Democratic Party (PDP) candidate and incumbent member Hon. Oghene Ego, who polled 5,752 votes.

== Early life and education ==
He was born into the family of King Sunny Ade, (Juju maestro), and Risikat Ajoke Adegeye, a former member of the Lagos State House of Assembly.
