= Mustapha Ekemode =

Nigerian Islamic preacher (c.1898–?)

Mustapha Ekemode was a Nigerian Islamic preacher who was National Missioner of Ansar Ud Deen Society from 1942 to 1972.

Ekemode was born c. 1898 and attended a Muslim primary school in Lagos, he then proceeded to Eko Boys High School for secondary school. Thereafter, he attended an Arabic school in Ibadan headed by Alfa Haruna, who later became Chief Imam of Ibadan. From 1920 to 1942, Ekemode worked as a cashier, clerk, sales and produce clerk for some firms including UAC. In 1942, he became the national missioner of Ansar ud Deen and held the position until 1957, two years after he joined the civil service. In 1957, he became head of Muslim religious broadcasting for the Nigerian Broadcasting Corporation.
