= Temitope Adedeji Adewale =

Nigerian politician (born 1987)

The Honourable Temitope Adedeji Adewale

Member of the Lagos State House of Assembly
- Incumbent
- Assumed office 18 March 2023

Member of the Lagos State House of Assembly from Ifako-Ijaiye Local Government
- Incumbent
- Assumed office 18 March 2023
- Constituency: Ifako-Ijaiye

Personal details
- Born: 13 January 1987 (age 39) Ifako-Ijaiye, Ifako-Ijaiye Local Government Lagos State Nigeria
- Party: All Progressive Congress
- Education: Lagos State University
- Occupation: Politician; Project Manager; Administrator

Temitope Adedeji Adewale is a Nigerian politician. He currently serves as the State Representatives representing Ifako-Ijaiye I constituency at the Lagos State House of Assembly.
