= Nigerian Institute of Medical Research =

Medical research institute in Nigeria

Nigeria Institute of Medical Research (NIMR)
- Founder: Federal Government of Nigeria
- Type: Professional organization
- Purpose: Research in diseases of public health importance
- Location: Yaba, Lagos state, Nigeria
- Region served: Nigeria
- Members: 2,000+
- Owner: Federal Republic of Nigeria
- Key people: Professor Babatunde Lawal Salako
- Website: http://www.nimr.gov.ng/

The Nigerian Institute of Medical Research (NIMR) in Yaba, Lagos state, Nigeria is a medical research institute. NIMR conducts research (basic, applied, and operational) into Communicable and Non-Communicable Diseases prevalent in the country to improve health and national development. The institute is a point of reference for promoting national health and development in Nigeria.

NIMR plays a vital role in developing viable structures for the dissemination of research findings and providing the enabling environment and facilities for health research and training in collaboration with the Ministry of Health and universities, and the organized private sector nationally and internationally.

In 2014, the institute played a decisive role in containing the Ebola outbreak in Lagos.

== History ==
The Nigeria institute of Medical Research (NIMR) is the foremost and oldest research Institution in Nigeria dating back to the arrival at Yaba of the British Yellow Fever commission in the 1920.

Entrance

NIMR was established by the Federal Government of Nigeria through the research institute establishment act of 1977, to promote national health and developments. Until the establishment of National Institute for Pharmaceutical Research and Development (NIPRID) in Abuja, it was the only institute in the country specifically dedicated to medical research. The current director-general of the Nigerian Institute of Medical Research is Professor John Oladapo Obafunwa, appointed by President Tinubu.

In 2014, the institute played a pivotal role in containing the Ebola outbreak in Lagos. - In April 2014, three months before Nigeria's first Ebola patient landed in Lagos, clinicians and research scientists affiliated with NIMR and the Lagos State Ministry of Health began preemptively to educate and train government health officials at the Lagos port and rural borders. They also trained doctors and medical workers on case definitions, as well as lab preparation.

== Areas of research ==
NIMR focuses on scientific area of research in biochemistry and nutrition, virology, vaccinology, immunology, health system and policy research, reproductive, maternal and childhood diseases, clinical science, microbiology, molecular biology, biotechnology and public health, with studies that focus on diseases of greatest public health importance in the country. These include: malaria, HIV/AIDS, tuberculosis, hepatitis, schistosomiasis, Helicobacter pylori, and typhoid.

NIMR has established laboratories (two are internationally accredited based on ISO15189 2012), human and infrastructural capacities for research and innovation, service and training that impact national health.

On 18 September 2020, NIMR unveiled the first SARS-CoV-2 Isothemal Molecular Assay (SIMA) kit in Nigeria to boost COVID-19 testing capacity.

== See also ==
- Nigeria Centre for Disease Control (NCDC)
- Nigerian Medical Association
- Cocoa Research Institute of Nigeria (CRIN)
