= Lagos Central senatorial district =

Senatorial district in Lagos State, Nigeria

The Lagos Central senatorial district in Lagos State, Nigeria covers the local government areas of Apapa, Eti-Osa, Lagos Island, Lagos Mainland, and Surulere. The senator currently representing the district is Wasiu Sanni of the All Progressives Congress, who was elected in 2023.

== List of senators ==
Senator	Party	Year	Assembly
Kofoworola Bucknor	SDP	5 December 1992 – 17 November 1993	3rd
Tokunbo Afikuyomi	AD	3 June 1999 – 3 June 2003	4th
Musiliu Obanikoro	AD	3 June 2003 – 5 June 2007	5th
Munirudeen Muse	ACN	5 June 2007 – 6 June 2011	6th
Oluremi Tinubu	APC	6 June 2011 – 11 June 2023	7th, 8th, 9th
Wasiu Sanni	APC	13 June 2023 – present	10th
