= Noheem Babatunde Adams =

Nigerian politician (born 1980)

The Honourable Noheem Babatunde Adams

Member and Majority Leader of the Lagos State House of Assembly
- Incumbent
- Assumed office 18 March 2023
- Constituency: Eti-Osa Local Government

Personal details
- Born: 15 April 1980 (age 46) Eti-Osa, Eti-Osa Local Government Lagos State Nigeria
- Party: All Progressive Congress
- Education: Lagos State University
- Alma mater: Lagos State University
- Occupation: Politician; Project Manager; Administrator; Tax Consultant

Noheem Babatunde Adams is a Nigerian tax consultant and politician representing the Eti-Osa I constituency, Eti-Osa local government area in the Lagos State House of Assembly.

== Early life and education ==
Noheem was born on 15 April 1980 in Lagos State, Nigeria. He obtained his bachelor's and master degree from Lagos State University (LASU), where he studied Political Science and International Relations and Strategic Studies respectively.

== Career ==
Noheem is an administrator and a tax consultant who joined politics, previously served as an administrator at Eti-Osa Local Government area of Lagos State prior to his election as a member of 7th Assembly in Lagos State under the All Progressive Congress platform in the 2015 general election.
