= Kazeem Alimi =

Nigerian politician

State Representative
- Constituency: Eti-Osa

Personal details
- Born: July 3, 1967
- Died: July 18, 2017 (aged 50)
- Occupation: Politician

Kazeem Alimi (born July 3, 1967) was a Nigerian politician who served as a member of the Lagos State House of Assembly, representing the Eti-Osa Constituency I. He died on July 18, 2017, two weeks after his 50th birthday, following a brief illness.
