= Tunde Braimoh =

Nigerian politician

State Representative
- Constituency: Kosofe

Personal details
- Died: 10 July 2020
- Occupation: Politician

Tunde Braimoh was a Nigerian politician and lawmaker. He represented Kosofe Constituency 2 at the Lagos State House of Assembly. He was the chairman house committee on information, security, and strategy in the Lagos state house of Assembly. He died on 10 July 2020 after a brief illness.
