= Adeleke Mamora =

Nigerian politician and doctor (born 1953)

Minister of Science, Technology and Innovation
- In office 16 July 2022 – 29 May 2023
- President: Muhammadu Buhari
- Preceded by: Ogbonnaya Onu
- Succeeded by: Uche Nnaji

Minister of State for Health
- In office 23 August 2019 – 16 July 2022
- President: Muhammadu Buhari
- Minister: Osagie Ehanire
- Preceded by: Osagie Ehanire
- Succeeded by: Ekumankama Joseph Nkama

Senator for Lagos East
- In office 3 June 2003 – 6 June 2011
- Preceded by: Adeseye Ogunlewe
- Succeeded by: Gbenga Ashafa

Speaker of the Lagos State House of Assembly
- In office 2 June 1999 – 2 June 2003
- Deputy: Adetoun Adediran
- Preceded by: Shakirudeen Kinyomi
- Succeeded by: Jokotola Pelumi

Member of the Lagos State House of Assembly
- In office 2 June 1999 – 2 June 2003

Personal details
- Born: 16 February 1953 (age 73) Lagos, British Nigeria (now in Lagos State, Nigeria)
- Party: All Progressives Congress
- Education: University of Ife
- Occupation: Politician; medical doctor

Adeleke Olorunnimbe Mamora (born 16 February 1953) is a Nigerian medical doctor and politician who served as the minister of Science and Technology from 2022 to 2023. He previously served has the minister of State for Health from 2019 to 2022. He served as the senator representing the Lagos East Senatorial District from 2003 to 2011, and as speaker of the Lagos State House of Assembly from 1999 to 2003. He is a member of the All Progressives Congress (APC).

He was a National Delegate for the National Republican Convention (NRC) in 1990, and Secretary, Lagos East of the United Nigeria Congress Party (UNCP) in 1998.

He was elected to the Lagos State House of Assembly in 1999, and was appointed Speaker.

He was Chairman of the Conference of Speakers from 2000 to 2001.

Mamora was elected to the Senate in April 2003, and reelected in 2007. He was also a member of the Economic Community of West African States (ECOWAS) Parliament from 2003 to 2006. In 2003, he was appointed chairman of the Senate Committee on Ethics, Privileges and Public Petitions.

After resuming his seat in the Senate in 2007, he was appointed to committees on Upstream Petroleum Resources, Selection Committee, Health and Federal Character & Inter-Government Affairs.

In a mid-term evaluation of Senators in May 2009, ThisDay noted that he had sponsored bills on Tenure of Office, Surgeon-General of Nigeria and repeal and amendment of the Tobacco Control Act. He sponsored or co-sponsored motions including one to amend Senate rule 111 to bring it into conformity with the Constitution of the Federal Republic of Nigeria. Mamora was described as a master of parliamentary procedures.

== Early life and education ==
Mamora was born on 16 February 1953. He obtained a B.Sc., Health Sciences, Bachelor of Medicine and Bachelor of Surgery (MBBS) University of Ife, Ile-Ife and became a Health Practitioner. He was medical director of a Medical Centre (1987–1998), and a Company Medical Adviser (1988–1992).
