= Speaker of the Lagos State House of Assembly =

Presiding officer of the Lagos State House of Assembly, Nigeria

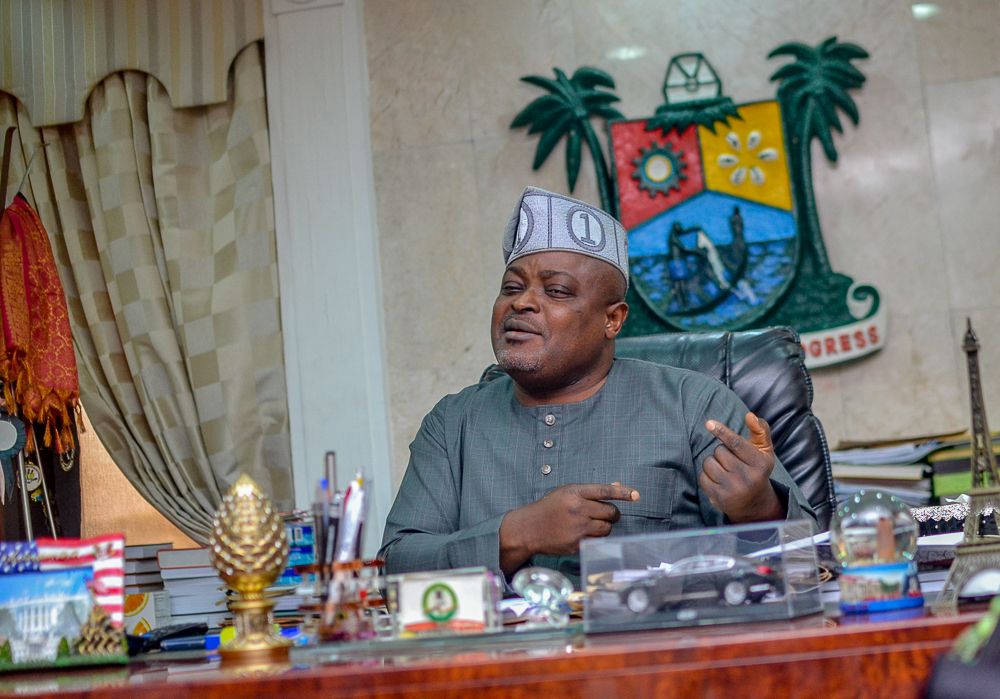
- Incumbent; Mudashiru Obasa since 3 March 2025
- Legislative Branch of the Lagos State Government
- Style: Mr/Madam Speaker (informal); The Right Honourable (formal)
- Member of: Lagos State House of Assembly
- Seat: Lagos State House of Assembly, Ikeja
- Appointer: Indirect House Election
- Term length: 4 years renewable
- Constituting instrument: Constitution of Nigeria
- Formation: 2 October 1979; 46 years ago
- First holder: Oladosu Oshinowo
- Succession: Second
- Deputy: Deputy Speaker of the Lagos State House of Assembly

The speaker of the Lagos State House of Assembly is the presiding officer of the Lagos State House of Assembly, elected by its membership. The Speaker is second in line of succession to the Lagos State governorship, after the deputy governor. The Speaker also represents the members of his or her constituency. Since inauguration of the state house of assembly on 2 October 1979, there have been 10 legislative assemblies with 8 representatives holding the office of Speaker. The current Speaker is Mudashiru Obasa who was reinstated on 3 March 2025, following his impeachment in January.

== List of Speakers ==
Source: Lagos State House of Assembly

Name	Took office	Left office	Party	Assembly
Oladosu Oshinowo	2 October 1979	5 October 1983	UPN	1st
Oladimeji Longe	6 October 1983	31 December 1983	UPN	2nd
Shakirudeen Kinyomi	14 January 1992	17 November 1993	NRC	3rd
Adeleke Mamora	2 June 1999	2 June 2003	AD	4th
Waheed Jokotola Pelumi	2 June 2003	29 December 2005	AD	5th
Sabit Adeyemi Ikuforiji	29 December 2005	4 June 2015	ACN/APC	5th, 6th, 7th
Mudashiru Obasa	8 June 2015	13 January 2025	APC	8th, 9th, 10th
Mojisola Meranda	13 January 2025	3 March 2025	APC	10th
Mudashiru Obasa	3 March 2025	Present	APC	10th

=== List of Deputy Speakers ===
Name	Took office	Left office	Party	Assembly
Oladimeji Longe	2 October 1979	5 October 1983	UPN	1st
Afolabi Oredoyin	6 October 1983	31 December 1983	UPN	2nd
Rasheed Adebowale Fashina	14 January 1992	17 November 1993	NRC	3rd
Adetoun Adediran	2 June 1999	2 June 2003	AD	4th
Farouk Adegboyega Oshodi	2 June 2003	4 June 2007	AD/ACN	5th
Adefunmilayo Tejuosho	4 June 2007	17 August 2009	ACN	6th
Bola Badmus-Olujobi	17 August 2009	4 June 2011	ACN	6th
Musibau Kolawole Taiwo	4 June 2011	4 June 2015	ACN/APC	7th
Wasiu Eshinlokun Sanni	8 June 2015	4 June 2023	APC	8th, 9th
Mojisola Meranda	6 June 2023	13 January 2025	APC	10th
Mojeed Fatai Adebola	15 January 2025	3 March 2025	APC	10th
Mojisola Meranda	3 March 2025	Present	APC	10th
