= Olumoh Saad Lukman =

Nigerian politician (born 1980)

The Honourable Olumoh Saad Lukman

Member of the Lagos State House of Assembly
- Incumbent
- Assumed office 18 March 2023

Member of the Lagos State House of Assembly from Ajeromi Ifelodun Local Government
- Incumbent
- Assumed office 18 March 2023
- Constituency: Ajeromi Ifelodun I

Personal details
- Born: 15 April 1980 (age 46) Ajeromi-Ifelodun, Ajeromi-Ifelodun Local Government Lagos State Nigeria
- Party: All Progressive Congress
- Education: Lagos State University
- Alma mater: Lagos State University
- Occupation: Politician; Project Manager; Administrator; Tax Consultant

Olumoh Saad Lukman is a Nigerian tax consultant and politician representing the Ajeromi Ifelodun I constituency in Ajeromi-Ifelodun local government area in the Lagos State House of Assembly.

== Early life and education ==
Olumoh was born in October 1966 in Lagos State, Nigeria. He obtained his bachelor's and master degree from Lagos State University (LASU), where he studied banking and finance respectively.

== Career ==
Olumoh an administrator and currently serves as the Chairman, Ad Hoc Committee, Lagos State House of Assembly, in the 10th Assembly, Lagos State, under the All Progressives Congress platform in the 2023 general election.
