= Wasiu Sanni =

Nigerian politician (born 1961)

Senator for Lagos Central
- Incumbent
- Assumed office 13 June 2023
- Preceded by: Oluremi Tinubu

Deputy Speaker of the Lagos State House of Assembly
- In office 8 June 2015 – 4 June 2023
- Speaker: Mudashiru Obasa
- Preceded by: Musibau Kolawole Taiwo
- Succeeded by: Mojisola Lasbat Meranda

Member of the Lagos State House of Assembly
- In office 8 June 2015 – 4 June 2023
- In office 2 June 1999 – 2 June 2003
- Constituency: Lagos Island I

Personal details
- Born: Wasiu Eshilokun Sanni; 24 March 1961 (age 65)
- Party: All Progressives Congress (2013–present)
- Other political affiliations: Alliance for Democracy (1998–2006); Action Congress of Nigeria (2006–2013)
- Education: University of Lagos; Harvard Law School
- Occupation: Politician; agricultural economist

Wasiu Eshilokun Sanni (born 24 March 1961) is a Nigerian politician who has served as Senator for Lagos Central since 2023. He previously served as deputy speaker of the Lagos State House of Assembly from 2015 to 2023.

== Early life and education ==
Wasiu had his primary education at Holy Trinity Primary School, Ebute-Ero, Lagos, and his secondary education at Ansar-Ud-Deen College Offa, Kwara State. He holds a Bachelor of Science in agriculture from Olabisi Onabanjo University, Ago-Iwoye, and second degree in International Law and Diplomacy from the University of Lagos.

He also completed executive programs in Leadership and Executive Functions at Lagos Business School, Negotiation and Leadership at Harvard Law School, and Driving Government Performance at Harvard Kennedy School.

== Senate career ==
In the 10th Senate, Sanni chairs the Senate Committee on Marine Transport.
