= Adedamola Richard Kasunmu =

Nigerian politician

Hon. Adedamola Richard Kasunmu

member 8th Lagos State House of Assembly
- In office 2015–2019
- Constituency: Lagos, Ikeja Constituency II

Member 9th Lagos State House of Assembly
- Incumbent
- Assumed office 2019

Personal details
- Born: 29 March 1983 (age 43)
- Party: All Progressive Congress
- Occupation: Legislator

Adedamola Richard Kasunmu (popularly known as ARK) is a Nigerian politician and member of Lagos State House of Assembly representing Ikeja constituency II. Adedamola has been a member of the State House of Assembly since 2015.

== Political career ==
Kasunmu was born on 29 March 1983. 1n 2015, he was elected as a lawmaker representing Ikeja constituency II under the All Progressives Congress party and was chairman of the Lagos State House of Assembly Committee on Youth and Social Development. He is a nephew of Bola Ahmed Tinubu, the national leader of the All Progressives Congress in Nigeria. As a lawmaker, Kasunmu became the only first-term lawmaker in the 8th assembly of the state to sponsor two executive bills that were passed into law. The bills were passed into law for the establishment of Lagos State Sports Commission and Lagos State Sports Trust Fund. As a legislator from the 8th assembly from Ikeja constituency II, Kasunmu facilitated the admission of over 200 students of Lagos State University and 105 youths into the Lagos State Civil Service between 2015 and 2024. Between 2016 and 2024, he has sponsored over 3000 students for Joint Admissions and Matriculation Board exams into Nigerian universities and polytechnics Free. In 2016/2017, two members of his constituency were sent to the US and Scotland for Leadership training.

He won re-election for a third term as a legislator in March 2023.

He is currently the Deputy Majority Leader of the 10th Assembly of Lagos State House of Assembly
