= Rasheed Adebola Shabi =

Nigerian politician

Hon. Rasheed Adebola Shabi

Member, Lagos State House of Assembly
- Incumbent
- Assumed office 2023
- Constituency: Lagos Mainland Constituency II

Personal details
- Party: All Progressives Congress (APC)
- Education: University of Lagos; University of Ibadan
- Occupation: Politician, Chemical Engineer, Environmentalist
- Website: Lagos Assembly Profile

Rasheed Adebola Adekola Shabi is a Nigerian chemical engineer, environmentalist, and politician who currently serves as a member of the Lagos State House of Assembly, representing Lagos Mainland Constituency II.

== Early life and education ==
Rasheed Adebola Shabi was born in Lagos State. He attended Federal Government College Kano for his secondary education. He proceeded to the University of Lagos (UNILAG), where he obtained a Bachelor of Science (B.Sc.) in Chemical Engineering. He later earned a Master of Science (M.Sc.) in Chemical Engineering and a second Master of Science (M.Sc.) in Environmental Management, both from the University of Lagos. He is currently a PhD fellow in Environmental Management at the University of Ibadan.

== Career ==
=== Public service ===
Before his election to the legislature, Shabi had a career in the Lagos State Civil Service, serving as the General Manager and Chief Executive Officer of the Lagos State Environmental Protection Agency (LASEPA) from 2008 to 2017.

Following his time at LASEPA, he served as the Special Adviser to the Governor on Environment, where he played a key role in the "Cleaner Lagos Initiative" under the administration of Governor Akinwunmi Ambode.

=== Political career ===
In the 2023 general elections, Shabi contested for the Lagos Mainland Constituency II seat in the Lagos State House of Assembly under the All Progressives Congress (APC). He won the election, succeeding the previous representative who had moved to the House of Representatives.

Upon his inauguration into the 10th Assembly, he was appointed as the Chairman of the House Committee on Environment (Parastatals). In this capacity, he exercises oversight over agencies such as the Lagos Water Corporation (LWC) and LASEPA, ensuring the implementation of state environmental policies and public-private partnerships.
