= Oladosu Oshinowo =

Nigerian politician (1941–2013)

Speaker of the Lagos State House of Assembly
- In office 2 October 1979 – 5 October 1983
- Deputy: Oladimeji Longe
- Preceded by: office established
- Succeeded by: Oladimeji Longe
- Constituency: Ikorodu Constituency II

Personal details
- Born: July 1941 Ikorodu, Southern Region, British Nigeria (now in Lagos State, Nigeria)
- Died: 13 August 2013 (aged 72)
- Party: Unity Party of Nigeria
- Occupation: Politician

Oladosu Olumuyiwa Oshinowo (July 1941 – 13 August 2013) was a Nigerian politician who served as the first speaker of the Lagos State House of Assembly from 1979 to 1983, during the Second Nigerian Republic.

== Early life ==
He was born in Ikorodu local government area of Lagos State, southwestern Nigeria in July 1941. In 1979, he contested the Ikorodu constituency I seat of the Lagos State House of Assembly and was elected. He was elected speaker on 2 October 1979 and served in this capacity till 5 October 1983.
