= Setonji David =

Nigerian politician and philanthropist

Honourable Setonji Samuel David
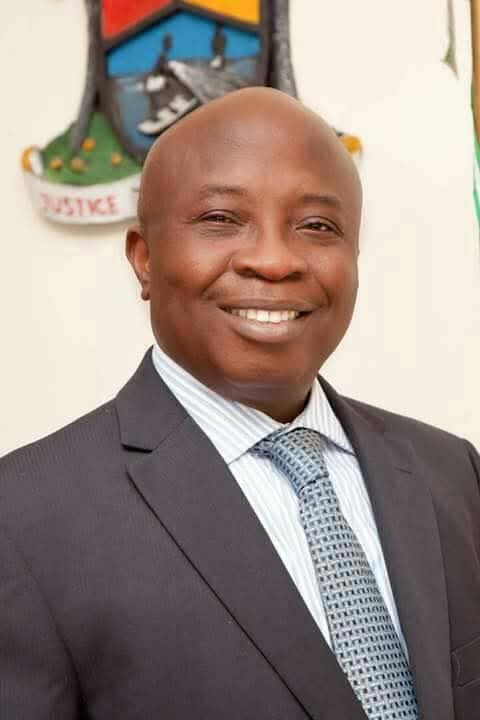

Member and Chief Whip of the Lagos State House of Assembly
- Incumbent
- Assumed office 2015
- Constituency: Badagry II

Personal details
- Born: 12 December 1959 (age 66) Lagos
- Party: All Progressives Congress (APC)
- Occupation: Politician

Setonji David (born 12 December 1959) is a Nigerian politician and the current Chief Whip of the Lagos State House of Assembly, representing Badagry Constituency II since 2015. He was the House Committee Chairman on Physical Planning and Urban Development.
