= Ansar Ud Deen =

Ansar-ud-Deen Society of Nigeria
- Formation: 21 December 1923
- Type: Religious Non Sectarian Organization
- Purpose: Reformation, Propagation and Defense of Islam and Education
- Headquarters: Ansar-ud-Deen Central Mosque, 19 Ajao Road, Surulere, Lagos
- National President: Prince Mosediq Adeniji Kazeem (SAN, FCArb)
- Key people: Sheikh AbdulRahman Olanrewaju Ahmad
- Website: www.ansaruddeensociety.org

Ansar-ud-Deen Society of Nigeria is a Muslims organization established for the purpose of the educational development of Muslims and also as a body to enhance the moral and social development of the Muslim community in Lagos. It was founded in 1923 as a non-sectarian and non-political educational association, although there are doubts about its non-political stance.

The society started out as a response to the advent of a class of Western trained Christian elites in the colonial capital of Lagos and also to engage in the promotion of reformist ideas and development in the Muslim communities of Lagos and later in Nigeria. The group, however, toed the line that a reformist Islam could co-exist with western innovations and ideas without relegating Islamic principles and values. With her mosque across the country, the organisation leads in propagation of the peace message of Islam using Quran and the Sunnah of Muhammad

== History ==
A series of meetings were held in November and December 1923 to form an association. On 21 December 1923, the Young Ansar Ud Deen was formed. A number of its original members were associated with Saros in Lagos.
