= Adeyemi Ikuforiji =

Nigerian politician and economist (born 1958)

The Right Honourable Adeyemi Ikuforiji

Speaker of the Lagos State House of Assembly
- In office 29 December 2005 – 4 June 2015
- Deputy: Farouk Adegboyega Oshodi; Adefunmilayo Tejuosho; Bola Badmus-Olujobi; Musibau Kolawole Taiwo
- Preceded by: Jokotola Pelumi
- Succeeded by: Mudashiru Obasa

Member of the Lagos State House of Assembly
- In office 2 June 1999 – 4 June 2015
- Constituency: Epe Constituency I

Personal details
- Born: Sabit Adeyemi Ikuforiji; 24 August 1958 (age 67) Epe, Western Region, British Nigeria (now in Lagos State, Nigeria)
- Party: All Progressives Congress (2013–present)
- Other political affiliations: Alliance for Democracy (1998–2006); Action Congress of Nigeria (2006–2013)
- Education: Babeș-Bolyai University; University of Lagos; Harvard University; Liverpool John Moores University; Bucharest Academy of Economic Studies; Cambridge University; Judge Business School
- Occupation: Politician; economist
- Website: www.adeyemiikuforijie.org

Sabit Adeyemi Ikuforiji (born 24 August 1958) is a Nigerian economist and politician who served as speaker of the Lagos State House of Assembly from 2005 to 2015.

He was charged alongside his former personal assistant Oyebode Atoyebi on a 54-count charge of money laundering amounting to 333.8 million Nigerian naira. He was acquitted.

== Early life ==
Sabit Adeyemi Ikuforiji was born on 24 August 1958 in Epe, Local Government area of Lagos State southwestern Nigeria. He attended Local Authority Central School in Epe before he proceeded to Epe Grammar School where he obtained the West Africa School Certificate in July 1975.

He received a bachelor's and master's degrees in economics from Babeș-Bolyai University and Bucharest Academy of Economic Studies respectively.

He later obtained a Master of Business Administration from the University of Lagos in 1980.

== Political life ==
He began his political career as the general secretary of the Unity Party of Nigeria. In 2003, he contested the seat of his constituency, Epe constituency I and was elected, member of Lagos State House of Assembly.

In December 2005, he was elected as Speaker of the house under the platform of Alliance for Democracy.

On 4 June 2007 he was re-elected for the second term as speaker of the 6th Assembly having emerge as winner of the race from his constituency.

On 4 June 2011 he was re-elected again for the third term as speaker of the 7th Assembly, that ran its course until 3 June 2015.
