= Mojisola Meranda =

Nigerian politician and lawmaker (born 1980)

Deputy Speaker of the Lagos State House of Assembly
- Incumbent
- Assumed office 3 March 2025
- Speaker: Mudashiru Obasa
- Preceded by: Mojeed Fatai Adebola
- In office 6 June 2023 – 13 January 2025
- Speaker: Mudashiru Obasa
- Preceded by: Wasiu Sanni
- Succeeded by: Mojeed Fatai Adebola

Speaker of the Lagos State House of Assembly
- In office 13 January 2025 – 3 March 2025
- Deputy: Mojeed Fatai Adebola
- Preceded by: Mudashiru Obasa
- Succeeded by: Mudashiru Obasa

Member of the Lagos State House of Assembly
- Incumbent
- Assumed office 8 June 2015
- Constituency: Apapa Constituency I

Personal details
- Born: 16 August 1980 (age 45)
- Party: All Progressive Congress (2013–present)
- Occupation: Politician; lawmaker

Mojisola Lasbat Meranda (born 16 August 1980) is a Nigerian politician who has served as the deputy speaker of the Lagos State House of Assembly since March 2025. She previously served as deputy speaker from June 2023 to January 2025, and as speaker from January to March 2025, following the impeachment of Mudashiru Obasa over allegations of gross misconduct and abuse of office in January, and his reinstatement in March. She has been the lawmaker representing Apapa I constituency since June 2015.

On 3 March 2025, barely six weeks into her Speakership, Meranda resigned her office and was re-elected as the Deputy Speaker of the Lagos State House of Assembly, while Obasa was reinstated as the Speaker.
