= Mudashiru Obasa =

Nigerian politician and lawyer (born 1972)

The Right Honourable Mudashiru Obasa
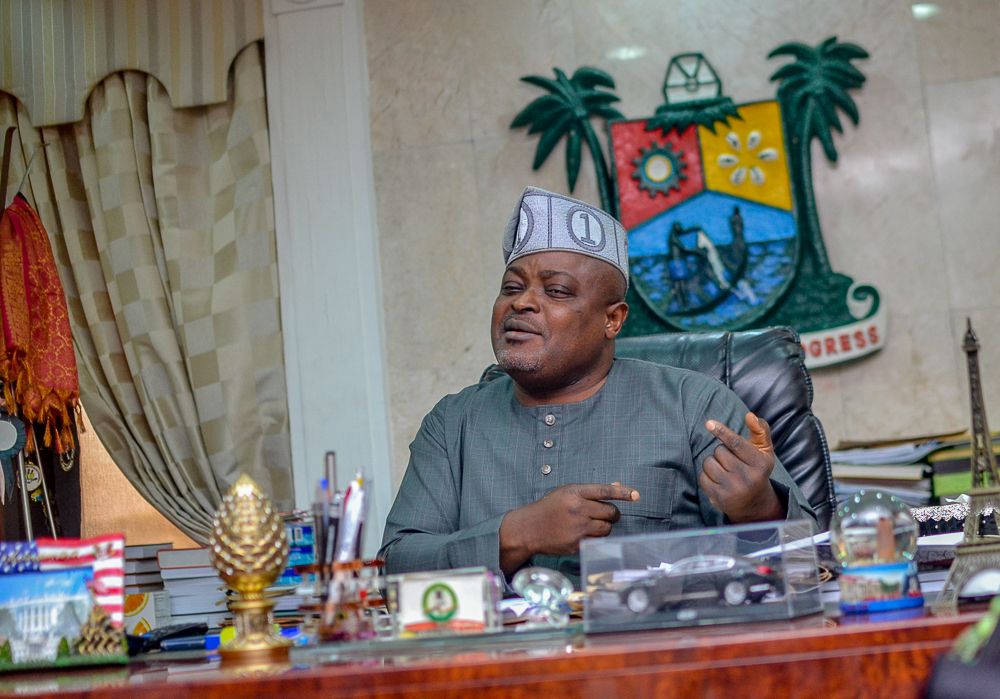

Speaker of the Lagos State House of Assembly
- Incumbent
- Assumed office 3 March 2025
- Deputy: Mojisola Meranda
- Preceded by: Mojisola Meranda
- In office 8 June 2015 – 13 January 2025
- Deputy: Wasiu Sanni; Mojisola Meranda
- Preceded by: Adeyemi Ikuforiji
- Succeeded by: Mojisola Meranda

Member of the Lagos State House of Assembly
- Incumbent
- Assumed office 4 June 2007
- Constituency: Agege Constituency I

Personal details
- Born: Mudashiru Ajayi Obasa; 11 November 1972 (age 53) Agege, Lagos, Nigeria
- Party: All Progressive Congress (2013–present)
- Other political affiliations: Alliance for Democracy (1998–2006); Action Congress of Nigeria (2006–2013)
- Education: Lagos State University (LL.B.)
- Occupation: Politician; lawyer

Mudashiru Ajayi Obasa (born 11 November 1972) is a Nigerian lawyer and politician who has served as speaker of the Lagos State House of Assembly since March 2025. He previously served as speaker from June 2015 to January 2025. He is a member of the ruling All Progressives Congress.

== Early life ==
Mudashiru Ajayi Obasa was born in Agege, a town in Lagos State southwestern Nigeria on 11 November 1972. He had his primary education at St Thomas Acquinas Pry School, Surulere, Lagos before he proceeded to Archbishop Aggey Memorial Secondary school, Mushin, Ilasamaja, Lagos where he obtained the West Africa School Certificate. He received a bachelor's degree in Law from Lagos State University, Lagos in 2006.

== Political career ==
In 1999, he contested the seat of councilor at Agege local government under the Alliance for Democracy party and won. He served between 1999 and 2002.

He was elected to the Lagos State House of Assembly representing Agege Constituency I in 2007. He was reelected in 2011, 2015, 2019, and 2023.

Amidst the #EndSARS saga in his home state, he was recorded on live TV saying "the LSHA will not acknowledge the death of miscreants at the hands of the Police Force" when calling for the one-minute silence for the victims of the #LekkiMassacre and others across Nigeria.

=== Corruption Scandal ===
In 2020, Sahara Reporters reportedly released allegation reports on misappropriation of public funds against Obasa. He, however, denied all the allegations.

Sahara Reporters later reported that Obasa was taken in for questioning by the Economic and Financial Crimes Commission on 8 and 9 October 2020. According to an inside source confirmed to Sahara Reporters that Obasa feigned sickness during the interrogation at the EFCC's office, which caused interrogation to be stopped. Obasa had to be taken to the EFCC office's sick bay before being released on bail. Obasa then supposedly requested the return of his passport, ostensibly to seek medical treatment abroad before going on Umrah to meet with Bola Tinubu in Saudi Arabia. Obasa remains under investigation by the EFCC for allegations of misappropriation and fraud.

On 13 January 2025, Obasa was impeached by the majority members of the Lagos State House of Assembly over allegations of gross misconduct and abuse of office. His deputy, Mojisola Meranda was immediately elected and sworn in as his successor.

== See also ==
- List of Yoruba people
