= National Defence College, Nigeria =

Nigeria apex military training institution

National Defence College
- Type: Military Academy
- Established: 1992
- Commandant: Rear Admiral Olumuyiwa Morakinyo Olotu
- Location: Jabi District, Abuja, Nigeria; 9°00′24″N 7°15′47″E
- Website: ndc.gov.ng
- Location within Nigeria

National Defence College (NDC), formerly known as the National War College (NWC), is an apex military training institution of Nigeria for senior military officers of the Nigerian Armed Forces.

The NDC was established in 1992 as the highest military training institution for senior officers of the Nigerian Armed Forces, and is considered a centre of excellence for peace support operations training at the strategic level for West Africa. It was originally located in Lagos before relocating to Abuja, and has been permanently situated in the Jabi District of Abuja since 1998. The college provides the highest level of professional military education and training, and conducts research on security and governance through its Centre for Strategic Research and Studies.

== Establishment ==
The institution was established in 1992 as the highest military training institution for senior officers of the Nigerian Armed Forces and is considered a centre of excellence for peace support operations training at the strategic level for West Africa regions.

The NDC complements existing tri-service military training institutions, including the Armed Forces Command and Staff College in Jaji and the Nigerian Defence Academy, by providing training at the highest strategic level.

== History and background ==
The NDC initially operated from a temporary location at the former Ministry of Foreign Affairs site in Lagos before relocating to Abuja in 1995, again on a temporary basis, at Herbert Macaulay Way. It permanently moved to its current site in September 1998 at Piwoyi Street, along the Nnamdi Azikiwe International Airport road in the Jabi District of Abuja, following the inauguration of War College course 4 by Sani Abacha.

The institution direction of its affairs is presided by the Board of Governor comprises; the Minister of Defence, Commandant NDC, Chief of Defence Staff, Chief of Air Staff, Chief of Army Staff, Chief of Naval Staff and the Permanent Secretary of the Ministry of Defence.

== Philosophy ==
The NDC provides the highest level of professional military training, education, and formal experience, with an emphasis on military professionalism and decision-making within democratic political structures. It addresses policy options regarding the application of force for national security and regional stability.

== Mission ==
The mission of the institution is to impart knowledge and develop expertise and skills in selected senior military officers and civilians through a firm understanding of the factors affecting national security, and to prepare them for higher responsibilities at the strategic and operational level, including international assignments.

The NDC and its fellows aim to contribute to the evolution of military thought in the context of 21st-century challenges. The mission and philosophy of the NDC are pursued through seminars, conferences, lectures, syndicate assignments, and workshops.

== Partners ==
The NDC and the Peace Operations Training Institute have partnered to provide e-learning on peacekeeping courses, offering downloadable course materials for offline study by NDC personnel. The subject includes; French, English, Arabic and Spanish, the minimum of 75% pass in examination received the Certificate of Completion.

In cooperation with the Ministry of Defence and the Ministry of Foreign Affairs of Nigeria, the NDC has actively participated in peace support operations training and related activities since it began operations. The Centre for Strategic Research and Studies is responsible for coordinating peacekeeping training in Nigeria, serving senior military and paramilitary officers as well as their civilian counterparts in various ministries and agencies, including the Ministry of Finance and the Nigerian Customs Service, as well as officers from other countries, in preparation for higher strategic responsibilities. In 2004, the NDC, under the supervision of the Nigerian Ministries of Foreign Affairs and Defence and the Armed Forces Joint Staff, hosted a Challenges seminar on the Regional Dimensions of Peace Operations. It also co-chaired the working group on command and control for the report on designing mandates and capabilities for future peace operations.

It runs high and mid level strategic courses such as the; Peace Support Operations Planning Course, Senior Mission Leaders Course, Defence and Security Management Course, and Civil-military Relations through it Centre for Strategic Research and Studies. The NDC also conducts various research on the critical issues bordering on security and governance.

== Bibliography ==
- African Armed Forces and the Challenges of Defence Budgeting Issue 6 of Inauguration lecture series Issue 6 of National defence college Nigeria inauguration lecture series, G. J. Jonah, African Centre for Strategic Research and Studies, National Defence College Nigeria, 2008 Original from the University of California
- Developing Positive Attitude Issue 7 of Inauguration lecture series Author Thomas Jonah Lokoson, National Defence College Nigeria. African Centre for Strategic Research and Studies Publisher African Centre for Strategic Research and Studies (Africa Peace Review) Africa Peace Review National Defence College Nigeria, 2010.
