= Lagos State House of Assembly =

State legislature in Nigeria

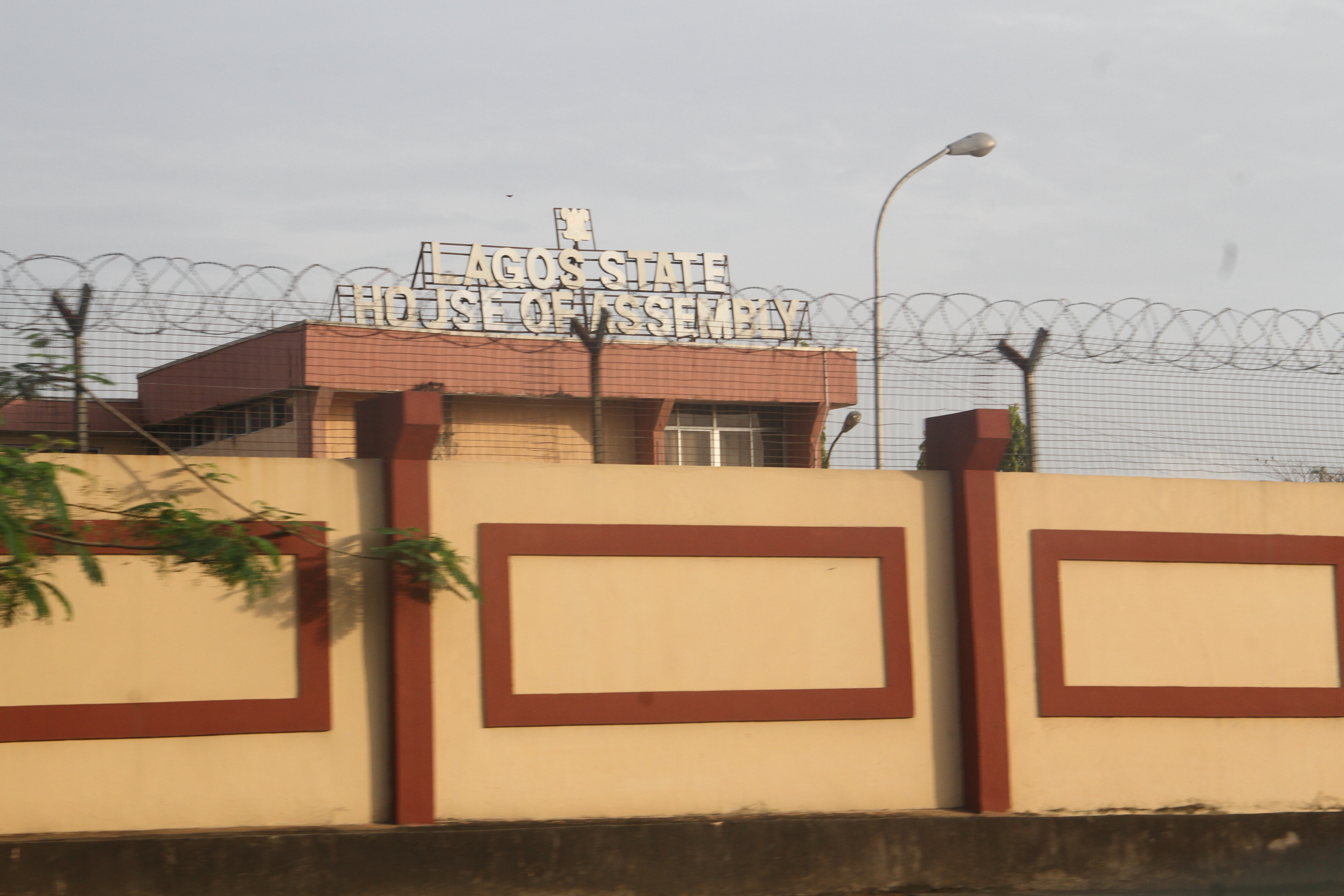
Lagos State House of Assembly

The Lagos State House of Assembly is the state legislature of Lagos State, Nigeria. It is situated along Governor's Avenue in the state capital, Ikeja. The House of Assembly is currently under the All Progressives Congress political party which is the current ruling party in Lagos State. There have been nine different house of assemblies, the first one was inaugurated 2 October 1979 and the present one was inaugurated 7 June 2019. There are forty members of the House of Assembly, two represent one of the twenty various local government areas in Lagos.

== Leadership ==
The present Speaker of the House of Assembly is The Right Honourable Mudashiru Obasa (Member representing Agege) 1 Constituency. Mojisola Meranda became the first female Speaker of the Lagos State House of Assembly. She was deputy to Obasa before he was impeached on 13 January 2025. Obasa was however reinstated following Meranda’s resignation on 3rd March, 2025.

== Functions ==
The purpose of the House of Assembly is to "provide information on the scope of responsibilities, services and commitment for the entire people of Lagos State". Their vision is to be "the leading light and pathfinder for Nigerian legislatures", and their mission is to make laws that will ensure good governance, representing the will of Lagosians and in the process ensuring judicious use of the resources of the state in order for Lagosians to receive maximum benefit.

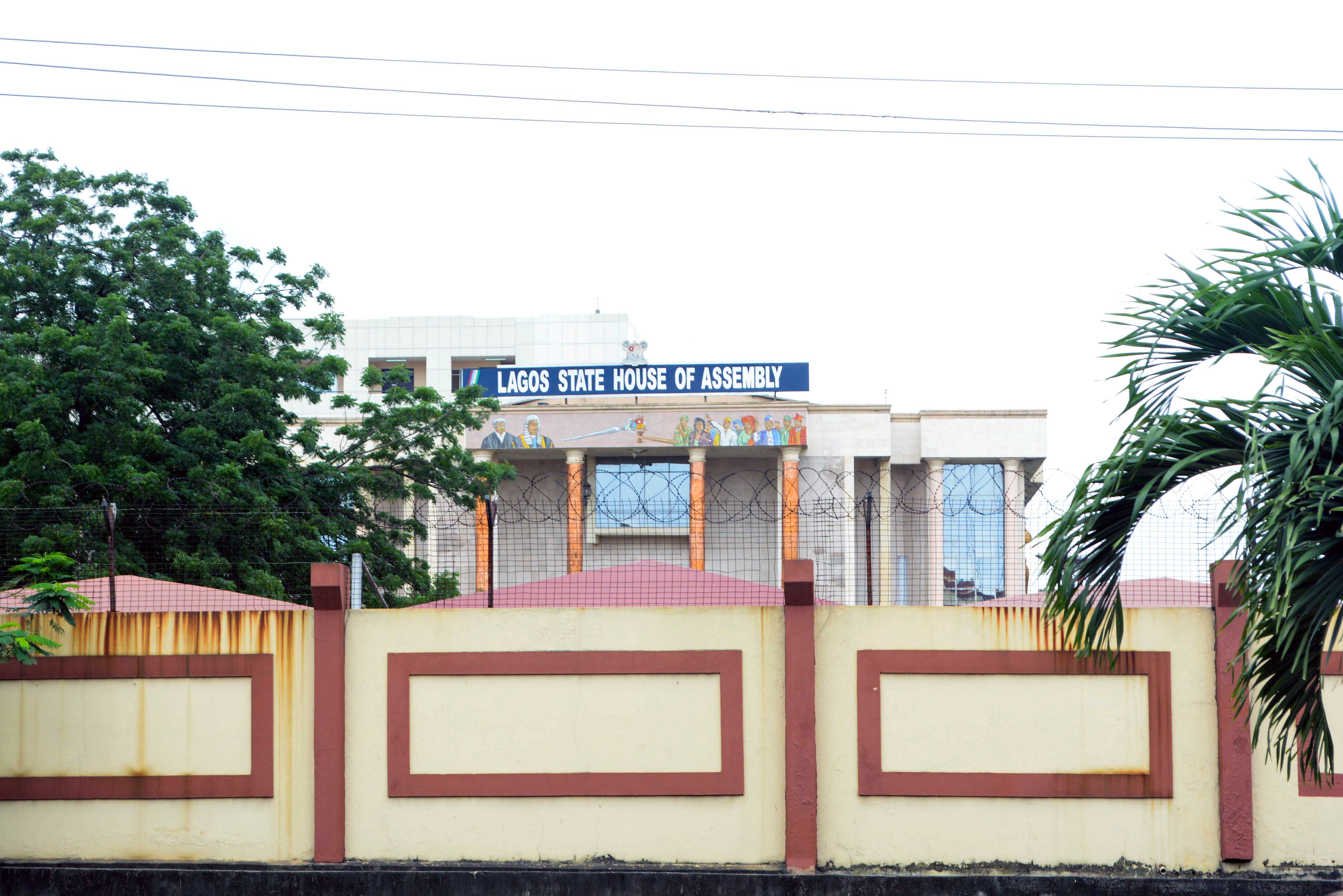
Lagos State House of Assembly (East View)

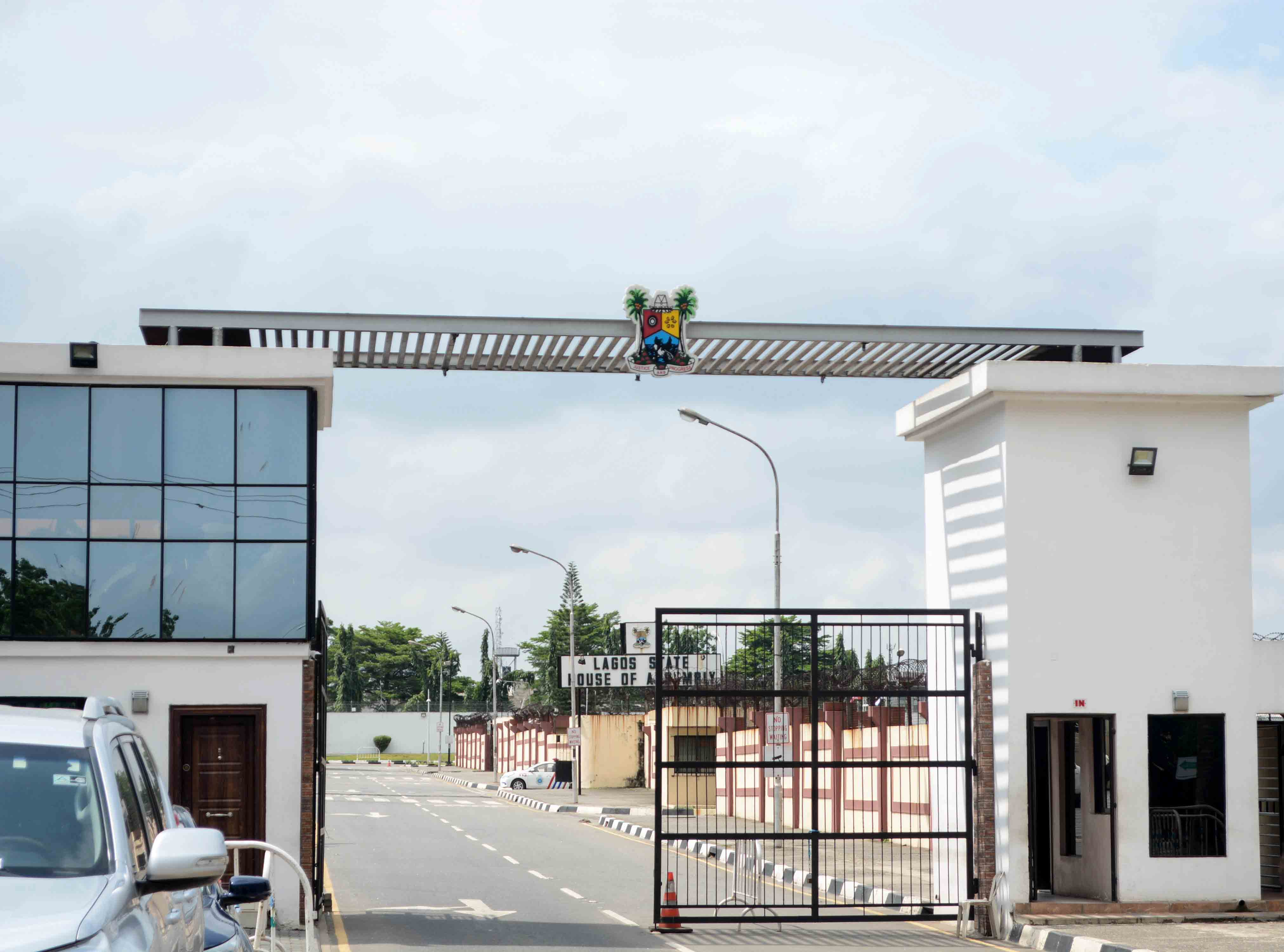
Lagos State House of Assembly

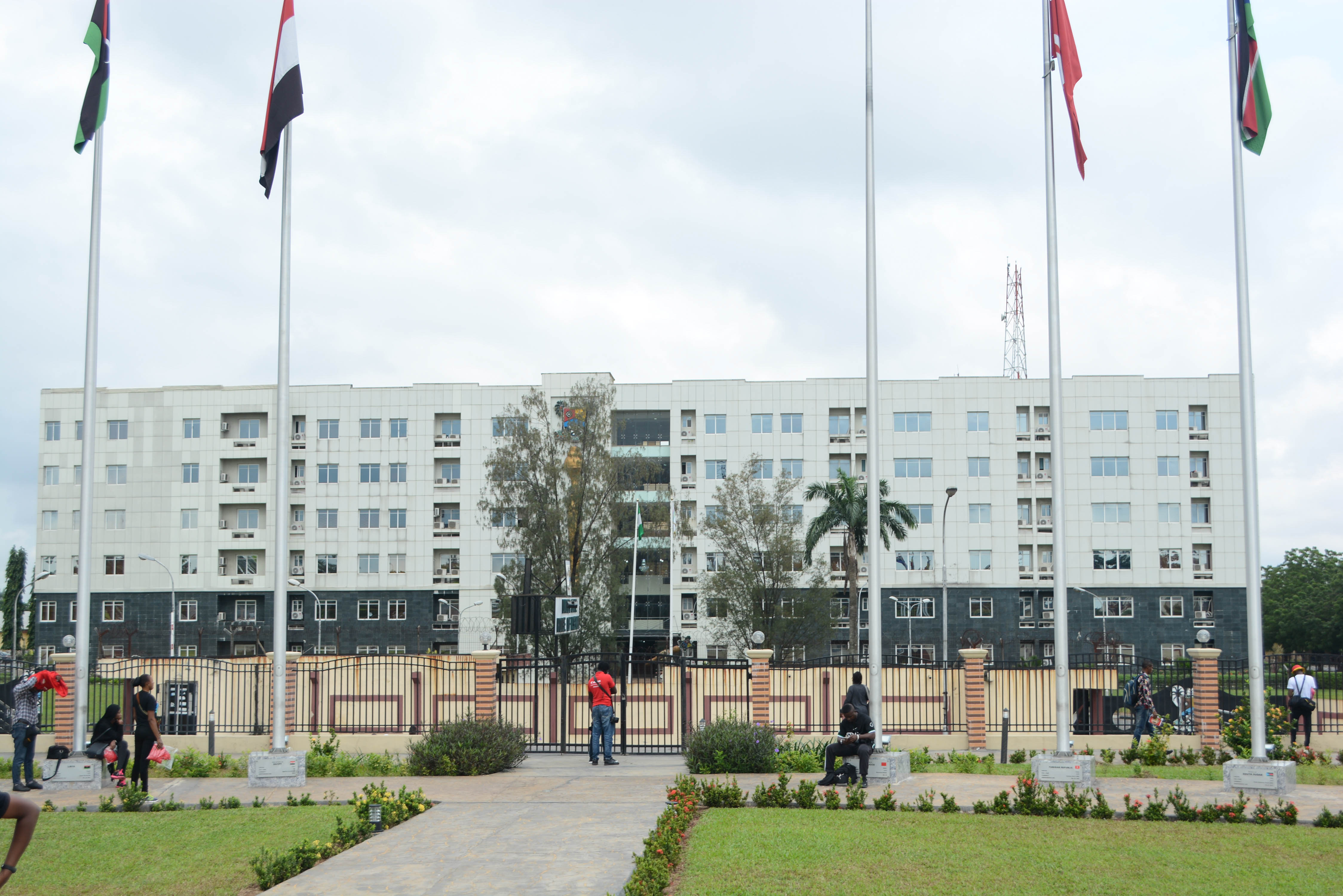
Lagos State House of Assembly, Alausa, Ikeja, Lagos.

The Lagos State House of Assembly was created to provide certain services for the good of Lagos state. Each service has various standards that must be met; for example, whenever the appropriation of a bill is passed on to the house they must ensure that estimates are critically analysed and resources are distributed in such a way those in need are put in priority. They must also ensure that the money budgeted is efficiently utilized judiciously as intended. When it comes to law making, the House of Assembly must ensure the laws are passed with the positive interest of Lagosians at heart. The laws must also be practical and implementable over a long period of time. In the case of legitimizing of a political candidate for office the House of Assembly must pick an individual who is well qualified and possesses the skills needed for the position. Members of the public are allowed to express their opinions of this candidate in the House of Assembly form petitions and all these petitions must be read and put into consideration before appointing the candidate for a public office. When members of the public send in petitions to the House of Assembly regarding various issues, the Committee Secretary of the House of Assembly is given a 48-hour limit to respond to these petitions leaving behind his name, position and contact information. Formal petitions will receive responses within two weeks of the day it was issued.

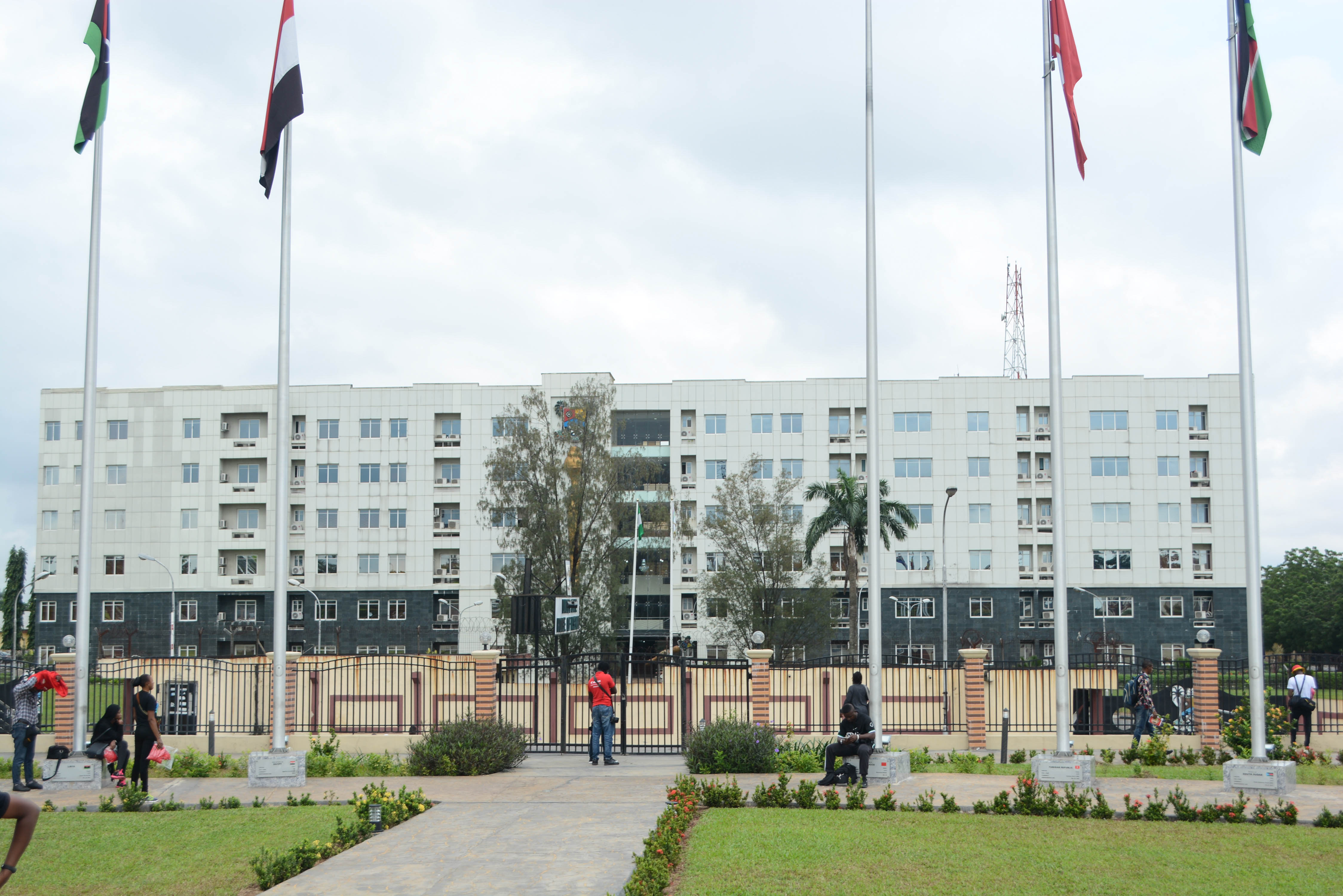
State House, Alausa

The House of Assembly recognizes that every Lagosian has the right to peacefully protest, therefore part of the House of Assembly's responsibility is to ensure that the citizens' rights are protected. Furthermore, the House of Assembly is entrusted with the responsibility of overseeing the activities of ministries, departments and agencies (MDA's), through committees. These committees conduct semi-annually and annually inspections on the books of MDA's in order to ensure they are complying with the rules and laws that have been put in place; any defiance of the law is punished accordingly. Lastly, another service they provide is publication of hansards, these are word for word reports of the proceedings in the House of Assembly and they are made available to the general public for a fixed fee.

== See also ==
- Lagos State Judiciary
- Olalekan Biliamin Onafeko
