= 2023 Lagos State gubernatorial election =

2023 gubernatorial election in Lagos State, Nigeria

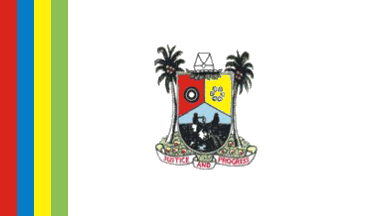
- 18 March 2023
- Opinion polls
- Registered: 7,060,195
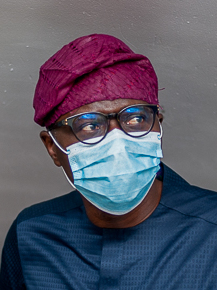

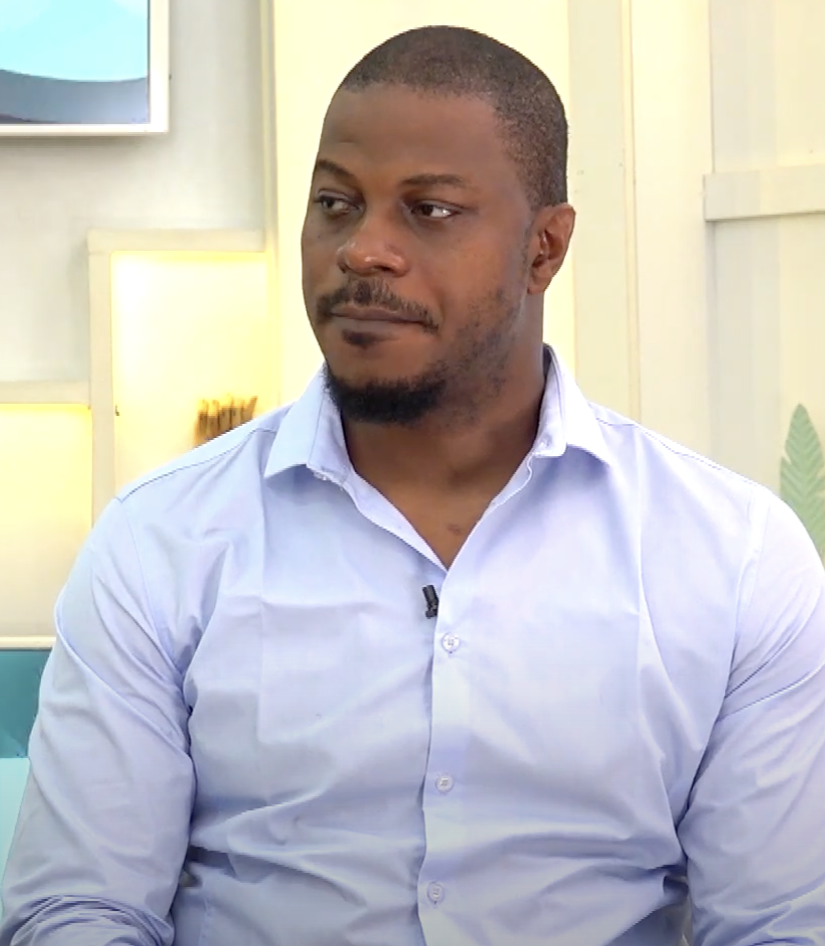
| | | | PDP |
| Nominee | Babajide Sanwo-Olu | Gbadebo Rhodes-Vivour | Abdul-Azeez Olajide Adediran |
| Party | APC | LP | PDP |
| Running mate | Femi Hamzat | Abiodun Oyefusi | Funke Akindele |
| Popular vote | 762,134 | 312,329 | 62,449 |
| Percentage | 65.95% | 27.03% | 5.40% |
- Results by local government area
Governor before election
Babajide Sanwo-Olu
APC
Elected Governor
Babajide Sanwo-Olu
APC

The 2023 Lagos State gubernatorial election was held on 18 March 2023 to elect the Governor of Lagos State, concurrent with elections to the Lagos State House of Assembly as well as twenty-seven other gubernatorial elections and elections to all other state houses of assembly. The election — which was postponed from its original 11 March date — was held three weeks after the presidential election and National Assembly elections. Incumbent APC Governor Babajide Sanwo-Olu was re-elected by a margin of 39% over first runner-up and LP nominee — Gbadebo Rhodes-Vivour.

The primaries, scheduled for between 4 April and 9 June 2022, resulted in Sanwo-Olu being renominated by the All Progressives Congress unopposed on 26 May while the Peoples Democratic Party nominated Abdul-Azeez Olajide Adediran on 25 May. On 4 August, Rhodes-Vivour — who withdrew from the PDP primary in May — won the rerun primary of the Labour Party.

In the early morning of 20 March, INEC declared Sanwo-Olu as the winner amid protests due to considerable reports of alleged electoral irregularities, including voter suppression and fraud. The official totals showed Sanwo-Olu winning just over 762,000 votes (~66% of the vote) to defeat Rhodes-Vivour with about 312,000 votes (~27% of the vote) and Adediran, who won around 62,000 votes (~5% of the vote). Due to alleged irregularities, Rhodes-Vivour and Adediran rejected the results and filed a challenges at the electoral tribunal. The legal cases eventually reached the Supreme Court, which upheld the election of Sanwo-Olu in a January 2024 judgment.

== Electoral system ==
The Governor of Lagos State is elected using a modified two-round system. To be elected in the first round, a candidate must receive the plurality of the vote and over 25% of the vote in at least two-thirds of state local government areas. If no candidate passes this threshold, a second round will be held between the top candidate and the next candidate to have received a plurality of votes in the highest number of local government areas.

== Background ==
Lagos State is a highly populated, diverse southwestern state that is a major financial centre along with being a key culture, education, and transportation hub. Although it faces overcrowding and chronic debilitating traffic, it has grown to one of the largest economies in Africa.

Politically, the 2019 elections were a continuation of the state APC's control as presidential incumbent Muhammadu Buhari won the state by 12% and the party held all three senate seats while gaining in the House of Representatives elections. On the state level, the APC also retained its House of Assembly majority but the gubernatorial election was prefaced by the unprecedented defeat of incumbent Akinwunmi Ambode in the APC primary, marking the first time an incumbent Nigerian governor was defeated in a party primary. His primary challenger, Sanwo-Olu, went on to win the general election by a wide 54% margin.

Ahead of Sanwo-Olu's term, the aims for his administration were improving transportation, health and environment, education and technology, entertainment and tourism, economic modernization, and security. In terms of his performance, Sanwo-Olu was commended for economic and academic digitalization, road infrastructure repairs, urban renewal, his initial COVID-19 pandemic response, and some public transportation improvements. However, his administration was criticized for poor distribution of COVID-19 palliatives, the BRT and Lagos NURTW crises, poor financial management, and alleged corruption. Sanwo-Olu also came under fire for his handling of the October 2020 protest wave of the End SARS movement, most staunchly over the Lekki massacre when soldiers that Sanwo-Olu requested for crowd control killed multiple protesters along with the shooting's aftermath when the Sanwo-Olu administration rejected a judicial review panel’s report confirming the massacre and instead drafted a white paper denying any deaths.

== Primary elections ==
The primaries, along with any potential challenges to primary results, were to take place between 4 April and 3 June 2022 but the deadline was extended to 9 June.

=== All Progressives Congress ===
Prior to the primary, some APC stakeholders called for Governor Sanwo-Olu to step down, as to allow a Muslim candidate to run since a Muslim would not have been elected Governor since 2011. However, others claimed Sanwo-Olu should be allowed to run for two terms before a Muslim candidate is nominated in 2027 and/or that Sanwo-Olu's first term should not be simply seen as an extension of former Governor Akinwunmi Ambode's term (especially as Ambode is from Lagos East while Sanwo-Olu is from Lagos Central). Another source of potential contention for Sanwo-Olu was his endorsement by the Lagos APC's Governance Advisory Council and its de facto leader, former Governor Bola Tinubu. The GAC is the most powerful state APC body and its endorsement of Sanwo-Olu carried him to victory in the 2019 primary but it delayed a decision on endorsing Sanwo-Olu in early 2022. The delay led to initial questions about if Tinubu and the GAC would back Sanwo-Olu's re-election bid but, despite the delay, the GAC endorsed Sanwo-Olu in April 2022. However, the endorsement was controversial in itself as supporters of other potential candidates decried it as 'undemocratic imposition' and a continuation of Tinubu's control of the state party.

On 20 April 2022, the APC National Executive Committee announced the party's schedule for gubernatorial primaries, setting its expression of interest form price at ₦10 million and nomination form price at ₦40 million with a 50% nomination form discount for candidates younger than 40 while women and candidates with disabilities get free nomination forms. Forms were to be sold from 26 April to 6 May until the deadline was later extended to 10 May then 12 May. After the submission of nomination forms by 13 May, candidates were screened by a party committee on 14 and 15 May while 16 May was the date for the screening appeal process. Ward congresses and LGA congresses were set for between 7 and 9 May to elect delegates for the primary. Candidates approved by the screening process advanced to a primary set for 26 May, in concurrence with other APC gubernatorial primaries; challenges to the result could be made the next day.

On the primary date, controversy emerged over the sudden and belated disqualification of Sanwo-Olu's opponents—Abdul-Ahmed Olorunfemi Mustapha and Wale Oluwo—which left Sanwo-Olu unopposed. Oluwo noted that the screening committee never publicly submitted its report and Mustapha was physically prevent from entering the primary venue. As Sanwo-Olu was the sole candidate, he won the primary unanimously later on 26 May. In his acceptance speech, Sanwo-Olu thanked delegates while pledging to continue the work of his administration. While Mustapha and Oluwo initially rejected the primary and planned to challenge the results, they eventually declined to make a formal appeal.

==== Nominated ====
- Babajide Sanwo-Olu: Governor (2019–present)
  - Running mate—Femi Hamzat: Deputy Governor (2019–present)

==== Disqualified by screening committee ====
- Abdul-Ahmed Olorunfemi Mustapha: former civil servant
- Wale Oluwo: former Commissioner for Energy and Mineral Resources

==== Declined ====
- Abdulhakeem Abdullateef: former Commissioner for Home Affairs (2015–2019)
- Tokunbo Abiru: Senator for Lagos East (2020–present) and former Commissioner for Finance (2011–2013)
- Akinwunmi Ambode: former Governor (2015–2019)
- Tayo Ayinde: Chief of Staff (2019–present)
- Femi Gbajabiamila: House of Representatives member for Surulere I (2003–present) and Speaker of the House of Representatives (2019–present)
- Femi Hamzat: Deputy Governor (2019–present), 2015 APC gubernatorial candidate, and former Commissioner for Science and Technology
- Hakeem Muri-Okunola: State Head of Service (2018–present)
- Seyi Tinubu: CEO of Loatsad Promomedia and son of former Governor of Lagos State Bola Tinubu

==== Results ====
APC primary results
| Party | Candidate | Votes | % |
|---|---|---|---|
| APC | Babajide Sanwo-Olu | 1,170 | 100.00% |
| Total votes | | 1,170 | 100.00% |
| Invalid or blank votes | | 12 | N/A |
| Turnout | | 1,182 | 98.66% |

=== People's Democratic Party ===
Ahead of the primary, candidate Abdul-Azeez Olajide Adediran and his Lagos4Lagos Movement defected from the APC to the PDP at a rally attended by several PDP incumbent governors and the party National Chairman Iyorchia Ayu. Analysts stated that the rally gave the appearance of national party support for Adediran's candidacy; however, five other candidates joined the primary race in the months after the defection. Another note for the party were the years of internal crises that rocked the Lagos PDP, but the dispute was settled by early 2022.

On 16 March 2022, the national PDP announced its gubernatorial primaries' schedule, setting its expression of interest form price at ₦1 million and the nomination form price at ₦20 million with a 50% discount for candidates between 25 and 30. Forms were to be sold until 1 April but the party later extended the deadline four times before reaching a final deadline of 22 April. After the submission of nomination forms by 25 April, candidates were screened by a party committee on 28 April while 2 May was the rescheduled date for the screening appeal process. Ward congresses were set for 29 April and LGA congresses were rescheduled for 10 May to elect delegates for the primary. Candidates approved by the screening process advanced to a primary set for 25 May, in concurrence with all other PDP gubernatorial primaries; challenges to the result could be made in the following days.

On the primary date, four candidates withdrew while the other two candidates continued to an indirect primary in Ikeja that ended in Adediran emerging as the party nominee after results showed him winning over 97% of the delegates' votes. The only other candidate to go to the primary, David Kolawole Vaughan, accepted the results and pledged to support Adediran while Adediran promoted a conciliatory tone with aims of uniting the party ahead of the general election. The weeks after the primary were dominated by the search for Adediran's running mate, with the party forming a shortlist of five: Funke Akindele, Teslim Balogun, Kolawole Vaughan, Gbadebo Rhodes-Vivour, and Yeye Shobajo. On 12 July, Akindele—an actor and film producer—was announced as the deputy gubernatorial nominee in a video on her verified Instagram page. The nomination was noted by pundits as another example of celebrity politics amid several other celebrities running for office.

==== Nominated ====
- Abdul-Azeez Olajide Adediran: Convener of the Lagos4Lagos Movement and journalist
  - Running mate—Funke Akindele: actor and producer

==== Eliminated in primary ====
- David Kolawole Vaughan: fashion designer

==== Withdrew ====
- Adedeji Doherty: former Lagos State PDP Chairman (2019–2020) and 2015 and 2019 PDP gubernatorial candidate
- Shamsideen Ade Dosunmu: 2011 PDP gubernatorial candidate and former Director General of the Nigerian Maritime Administration and Safety Agency (2007–2009)
- Wale Gomez: businessman (to run for senator for Lagos Central)
- Jim-Kamal Olanrewaju: businessman
- Gbadebo Rhodes-Vivour: 2019 PDP Lagos West senatorial nominee (defected after the primary to successfully run in the LP rerun gubernatorial primary)

==== Declined ====
- Jimi Agbaje: 2015 and 2019 PDP gubernatorial nominee and 2007 DPA gubernatorial nominee
- Babatunde Gbadamosi: 2020 PDP Lagos East senatorial by-election nominee, 2019 ADP gubernatorial nominee, and 2015 PDP gubernatorial candidate
- Abiodun Oyefusi: 2019 PDP Lagos East senatorial nominee

==== Results ====
Candidates' vote share
1. Abdul-Azeez Olajide Adediran (97.1%)
2. David Kolawole Vaughan (2.86%)

PDP primary results
| Party | Candidate | Votes | % |
|---|---|---|---|
| PDP | Abdul-Azeez Olajide Adediran | 679 | 97.14% |
| PDP | David Kolawole Vaughan | 20 | 2.86% |
| Total votes | | 699 | 100.00% |
| Invalid or blank votes | | 10 | N/A |
| Turnout | | 709 | 100.00% |

=== Minor parties ===
- Hakeem Dickson (Accord)
  - Running mate: Caroline Emimie Mate
- Tope Abdurrazaq Balogun (Action Alliance)
  - Running mate: Salako Tosin Mautin
- Ishola Bamidele (Action Democratic Party)
  - Running mate: Omobola Tawakalit Adewusi
- Abiola Roseline Adeyemi (Action Peoples Party)
  - Running mate: Opeyemi Adeyemi
- Akeem Olayiwola (African Action Congress)
  - Running mate: Ben Eze
- Funso Doherty (African Democratic Congress)
  - Running mate: Rosemary Giwa-Amu
- Funmilayo Kupoliyi (Allied Peoples Movement)
  - Running mate: O. Timothy Adepojo
- Wasiu Olawale Oluwo (Boot Party)
  - Running mate: Rotimi Balogun
- Gbadebo Rhodes-Vivour (Labour Party)
  - Running mate: Abiodun Oyefusi
- Olanrewaju Jim-Kamal (New Nigeria Peoples Party)
  - Running mate: Abiola Okoya
- Akinwunmi Ishola Braithwaite (National Rescue Movement)
  - Running mate: Azeezat Oluwatoyin Dabiri-Adewumi
- Taofeek Olakunle Uthman (Social Democratic Party)
  - Running mate: Animashaun Morenike Abeni
- Adebayo Ajayi (Young Progressives Party)
  - Running mate: Temitayo Shodoke
- Adekunle Adenipebi (Zenith Labour Party)
  - Running mate: Moses Adekoyejo Kassim

== Campaign ==
After the major party primaries, pundits viewed Adediran and Sanwo-Olu as the obvious major contenders but noted that the Labour Party—which had been rapidly growing due to Peter Obi's presidential campaign—could pose a challenge to the major parties. However, the state LP was embroiled in a crisis over its gubernatorial nomination as original nominee Ifagbemi Awamaridi repeatedly refused to step down for politician Gbadebo Rhodes-Vivour, who had won the party's rerun primary in August. Although The Nation's Emmanuel Badejo surmised that the crisis meant the LP did "not stand much of a chance [of victory]," he also noted that the LP nominee could end up as a "spoiler" for Adediran due to their overlapping support bases. However, the LP crisis ended with Rhodes-Vivour emerging as the recognized nominee and the rise of the party at-large increased Rhodes-Vivour's chances.

Meanwhile, as the general election campaign began, Adediran attacked Sanwo-Olu in July by accusing his administration of using state government regulatory agencies to block PDP advertising, claiming that advert agencies contracted by the PDP had refunded the party due to threats from the Lagos State Signage and Advertisement Agency (LASAA). LASAA denied the claim and noted that its regulatory responsibility does not include advertising on billboards as the agency only regulates the billboard structures themselves. For his part, Sanwo-Olu claimed Adediran was "inexperienced" while Adediran accused Sanwo-Olu of failing upwards into his office before continuing his failures as governor. Similarly, an audio emerged in August where someone alleged to be a LASAA official said only APC billboards receive approval to an LP supporter. In response, LASAA denied the veracity of the audio and again noted that its remit does not include the advertising on billboards.

By October and November, reporters began reviewing the strengths and weaknesses of each major candidate while Adediran and Rhodes-Vivour started feuding over an alleged deal whereby Adediran had allegedly vowed to pick Rhodes-Vivour as his running mate in May. On 7 November, the first public poll—conducted by NOI Polls and commissioned by the Anap Foundation—was released, showing a substantial lead for Sanwo-Olu. As the campaign continued into December, the Sanwo-Olu administration was again accused of abusing the power of government for political purposes after reports found that the Lagos State Traffic Management Authority was selectively closing roads and diverting traffic for only APC campaign events. As the election neared in January, reports of attempts at suppression from the APC increased with both the LP and PDP accusing the state government and APC of destroying opposition banners and posters, attacking and intimidating of opposition supporters, and continued prevention of using billboards. On 27 and 28 January, two politically-motivated shootings in Surulere rocked the state with the first shooting being another attack on Adediran's convoy that injured three people while the next day's shooting was conducted by unknown "thugs." Sanwo-Olu and his administration blamed the latter shooting on the PDP, using it as justification to withdraw from the 29 January gubernatorial debate; in response, Adediran claimed that the shooting had actually been targeted at him and that Sanwo-Olu was dodging public discourse by skipping the debate. The debate, organized by The Platform Nigeria, proceeded without Sanwo-Olu as the other invitees—Adediran, Rhodes-Vivour, and ADC nominee Funso Doherty—agreed to participate. Moderated by journalist Victor Oladokun, the debate touched on several topics including education, electoral violence, environmental protection, housing, police brutality, transportation, unemployment, and water management.

In early February, Lagos State polling data and analysis from Stears Business was released; while it focused on the presidential race—where results showed a surprising lead for Peter Obi (LP), its gubernatorial section showed a substantial lead for Sanwo-Olu but with the caveat of a large number of undecideds. In the following days, allegations of bias against INEC Resident Commissioner Olusegun Agbaje led to calls for his resignation while mass coordinated attacks on LP supporters before an Obi rally at Tafawa Balewa Square reinforced fears of further violence. A second debate, organised by a consortium of civil society groups, took place on 15 February and again Sanwo-Olu did not attend.

Later in February, focus switched to the presidential election on 25 February. In the election, Lagos State voted for Peter Obi (LP); Obi won the state with 45.8% of the vote, beating Bola Tinubu (APC) at 45.0% and Atiku Abubakar (PDP) at 6.0%. Considered a massive upset—especially considering Lagos is Tinubu's home state and projections had favored Tinubu—the result led to increased focus on the gubernatorial race. For Sanwo-Olu and the APC, the presidential result was interpreted as a "wake-up call" for the state APC that forced it into recognizing the competitiveness of the gubernatorial election. However, the tactics used by the APC in the final stretch of campaigning came under criticism due to renewed reports that the administration had appropriated government agencies (like Lagos State Traffic Management Authority) to campaign for Sanwo-Olu and organized vote-buying operations in addition to increasingly using ethnic bigotry in campaigning through threats to non-indigenous ethnicities and repeated attacks on Rhodes-Vivour for his half-Igbo heritage. Analysis on Rhodes-Vivour noted the detriment of his incomplete Yoruba fluency but focused on his connection to the Obi movement through his mixed heritage and history with the End SARS protests; additionally, Rhodes-Vivour outlined planned government reforms to combat flooding, traffic, and corruption with further focuses on social welfare and workers' rights. Pundits also used the presidential results to project potential target LGAs for Rhodes-Vivour and Sanwo-Olu.

In the final week of campaigning, concerns of planned voter suppression increased after several traditional rulers suddenly proclaimed the Oro Festival—a traditional Yoruba festival during which women and non-indigenes are barred from the streets—for the nights around election day. While the traditional rulers claimed the proclamations were unrelated to the upcoming election and that the festival would not affect voting, LP figures claimed the declarations were an attempt to intimidate non-APC voters and noted the close connections between many traditional rulers and the APC. Another cause for concern were statements by MC Oluomo and other APC figures directly threatening non-APC voters based on ethnicity. The suppressive tactics amplified to the point where pundits claimed that 'sufficient intimidation' of non-Yorubas could led to Sanwo-Olu's victory.

=== Election debates ===
2023 Lagos State gubernatorial election debates
| Date | Organisers | P Present (Note: Denotes a party gubernatorial nominee attending the event.) S Surrogate (Note: Denotes a party gubernatorial nominee not attending the event, sending a surrogate in their place.) NI Not invited A Absent invitee | | | | | | | |
| Date | Organisers | ADC | APC | LP | NRM | PDP | SDP | Other parties | Ref. |
|---|---|---|---|---|---|---|---|---|---|
| 29 January | The Platform Nigeria | P Doherty | A Sanwo-Olu | P Rhodes-Vivour | NI; Braithwaite | P Adediran | NI; Uthman | NI; Multiple | |
| 15 February | Various | P Doherty | P Sanwo-Olu | P Rhodes-Vivour | P Braithwaite | P Adediran | P Uthman | NI; Multiple | |

=== Polling ===
| Polling organisation/client | Fieldwork date | Sample size | | | PDP | Others | Undecided | None/No response/Refused |
| Polling organisation/client | Fieldwork date | Sample size | Sanwo-Olu APC | Rhodes-Vivour LP | Adediran PDP | Others | Undecided | None/No response/Refused |
|---|---|---|---|---|---|---|---|---|
| NOI Polls for Anap Foundation | October 2022 | 500 | 30% | 4% | 8% | – | 30% | 28% (Note: Refused: 26%; None: 2%) |
| Stears | January 2022 | 500 | 33% | 4% | 9% | – | 50% | 4% (Note: Undeclared: 4%) |
| NOI Polls for Anap Foundation | February 2023 | 500 | 31% | 8% | 7% | 2% | 19% | 33% (Note: Refused: 30%; None: 3%) |

== Projections ==
| Source | Projection | As of |
|---|---|---|
| Africa Elects (Note: AfricaElects projections predict the likelihood of a candidate winning a state by categorizing a state as "Safe" for exceedingly likely, "Likely" for somewhat likely, and "Lean" for least likely. If no clear determination could be made, states are categorized as "tossups".) | Tossup | 17 March 2023 |
| Enough is Enough- SBM Intelligence (Note: EiE-SBM projections predict which candidates will win states.) | Sanwo-Olu | 2 March 2023 |

== Conduct ==
=== Electoral timetable ===
On 26 February 2022, the Independent National Electoral Commission released the timetable, setting out key dates and deadlines for the election. Months later on 27 May 2022, INEC made a slight revision to the timetable, allowing parties extra time to conduct primaries.

- 28 February 2022 – Publication of Notice of Election
- 4 April 2022 – First day for the conduct of party primaries
- 9 June 2022 (Note: The original deadline was 3 June; however, INEC pushed it back to 9 June at the behest of parties.) – Final day for the conduct of party primaries, including the resolution of disputes arising from them
- 1 July 2022 – First day for submission of nomination forms to INEC via the online portal
- 15 July 2022 – Final day for submission of nomination forms to INEC via the online portal
- 12 October 2022 – Commencement of the official campaign period
- 16 March 2023 (Note: The original deadline was 9 March; however, INEC pushed it back to 16 March.) – Final day of the official campaign period

=== Pre-election ===
In the months before the election, dozens of reports from civil society groups and journalists along with LP and PDP supporters raised alarms over electoral violence and other forms of voter suppression. Continuous attempts at suppression from APC-backed assailants along with bias from the state government and local police were reported throughout the campaign period. The reports led to fears of electoral violence and voter suppression, with analysts noting common reports of suppression and violence from other recent elections in the state (especially in areas predominantly populated by non-Yorubas). As the election neared in early 2023, suppression reports increased rapidly with both the LP and PDP accusing the state government and APC of destroying opposition banners and posters, attacking and intimidating of opposition supporters, and continued prevention of using billboards with the LP even claiming that the APC had infiltrated local INEC offices to discard the Permanent Voter Cards of non-indigenes. These allegations of INEC infiltration were exacerbated by controversies surrounding INEC Resident Commissioner Olusegun Agbaje; while some groups called for Agbaje to resign in the wake of perceived anti-Igbo statements, most criticism was leveled against him due to his decision to use the Lagos State Park and Garage Management Committee to transport election materials and personnel on Election Day. The parks committee is chaired by MC Oluomo—a APC presidential campaign committee member, powerful agbero, and accused organizer of electoral violence—thus opposition questioned the commissioner's neutrality amid calls for his resignation. In the same regard, civil society groups noted risks of electoral interference in Lagos State with YIAGA Africa's Election Manipulation Risks Index placing the state as "High Risk" for manipulation. (Note: The index labeled Lagos State with five of the six potential manipulation variables: INEC Capture, tampering with the voter register, voter suppression, resistance to election technology, and a history of election fraud.)

== General election ==
=== Results ===
2023 Lagos State gubernatorial election
| Party | Candidate | Votes | % |
|---|---|---|---|
| A | Hakeem Dickson | | |
| AA | Tope Abdulrazaq Balogun | | |
| ADP | Ishola Bamidele | | |
| APP | Abiola Roseline Adeyemi | | |
| AAC | Akeem Olayiwola | | |
| ADC | Funso Doherty | | |
| APM | Funmilayo Kupoliyi | | |
| APC | Babajide Sanwo-Olu | 762,134 | 65.95% |
| BP | Wasiu Olawale Oluwo | | |
| LP | Gbadebo Rhodes-Vivour | 312,329 | 27.03% |
| New Nigeria Peoples Party | Olanrewaju Jim-Kamal | | |
| NRM | Akinwunmi Ishola Braithwaite | | |
| PDP | Abdul-Azeez Olajide Adediran | 62,449 | 5.40% |
| SDP | Taofeek Olakunle Uthman | | |
| YPP | Adebayo Ajayi | | |
| ZLP | Adekunle Adenipebi | | |
| Total votes | | | 100.00% |
| Invalid or blank votes | | | N/A |
| Turnout | | | |

==== By senatorial district ====
The results of the election by senatorial district.

| Senatorial District | Babajide Sanwo-Olu APC | | Gbadebo Rhodes-Vivour LP | | Abdul-Azeez Olajide Adediran PDP | | Others | | Total Valid Votes |
| Senatorial District | Votes | Percentage | Votes | Percentage | Votes | Percentage | Votes | Percentage | Total Valid Votes |
|---|---|---|---|---|---|---|---|---|---|
| Lagos Central Senatorial District (Note: Comprising the local government areas of Apapa, Eti-Osa, Lagos Island, Lagos Mainland, and Surulere.) | TBD | % | TBD | % | TBD | % | TBD | % | TBD |
| Lagos East Senatorial District (Note: Comprising the local government areas of Epe, Ibeju-Lekki, Ikorodu, Kosofe, and Somolu.) | TBD | % | TBD | % | TBD | % | TBD | % | TBD |
| Lagos West Senatorial District (Note: Comprising the local government areas of Agege, Ajeromi-Ifelodun, Alimosho, Amuwo-Odofin, Badagry, Ifako-Ijaiye, Ikeja, Mushin, Ojo, and Oshodi-Isolo.) | TBD | % | TBD | % | TBD | % | TBD | % | TBD |
| Totals | TBD | % | TBD | % | TBD | % | TBD | % | TBD |

==== By federal constituency ====
The results of the election by federal constituency.

| Federal Constituency | Babajide Sanwo-Olu APC | | Gbadebo Rhodes-Vivour LP | | Abdul-Azeez Olajide Adediran PDP | | Others | | Total Valid Votes |
| Federal Constituency | Votes | Percentage | Votes | Percentage | Votes | Percentage | Votes | Percentage | Total Valid Votes |
|---|---|---|---|---|---|---|---|---|---|
| Agege Federal Constituency (Note: Comprising the local government area of Agege.) | TBD | % | TBD | % | TBD | % | TBD | % | TBD |
| Ajeromi/Ifelodun Federal Constituency (Note: Comprising the local government area of Ajeromi-Ifelodun.) | TBD | % | TBD | % | TBD | % | TBD | % | TBD |
| Alimosho Federal Constituency (Note: Comprising the local government area of Alimosho.) | TBD | % | TBD | % | TBD | % | TBD | % | TBD |
| Amuwo Odofin Federal Constituency (Note: Comprising the local government area of Amuwo-Odofin.) | TBD | % | TBD | % | TBD | % | TBD | % | TBD |
| Apapa Federal Constituency (Note: Comprising the local government area of Apapa.) | TBD | % | TBD | % | TBD | % | TBD | % | TBD |
| Badagry Federal Constituency (Note: Comprising the local government area of Badagry.) | TBD | % | TBD | % | TBD | % | TBD | % | TBD |
| Epe Federal Constituency (Note: Comprising the local government area of Epe.) | TBD | % | TBD | % | TBD | % | TBD | % | TBD |
| Eti-Osa Federal Constituency (Note: Comprising the local government area of Eti-Osa.) | TBD | % | TBD | % | TBD | % | TBD | % | TBD |
| Ibeju-Lekki Federal Constituency (Note: Comprising the local government area of Ibeju-Lekki.) | TBD | % | TBD | % | TBD | % | TBD | % | TBD |
| Ifako/Ijaiye Federal Constituency (Note: Comprising the local government area of Ifako-Ijaiye.) | TBD | % | TBD | % | TBD | % | TBD | % | TBD |
| Ikeja Federal Constituency (Note: Comprising the local government area of Ikeja.) | TBD | % | TBD | % | TBD | % | TBD | % | TBD |
| Ikorodu Federal Constituency (Note: Comprising the local government area of Ikorodu.) | TBD | % | TBD | % | TBD | % | TBD | % | TBD |
| Kosofe Federal Constituency (Note: Comprising the local government area of Kosofe.) | TBD | % | TBD | % | TBD | % | TBD | % | TBD |
| Lagos Island I Federal Constituency and Lagos Island II Federal Constituency (Note: Together comprising the local government area of Lagos Island.) (Note: These two constituencies are within a single LGA. As this table does not differentiate between intra-LGA results, these figures are for the entire LGA which is the same as the data for both constituencies.) | TBD | % | TBD | % | TBD | % | TBD | % | TBD |
| Lagos Mainland Federal Constituency (Note: Comprising the local government areas of Lagos Mainland.) | TBD | % | TBD | % | TBD | % | TBD | % | TBD |
| Mushin I Federal Constituency and Mushin II Federal Constituency (Note: Together comprising the local government area of Mushin.) | TBD | % | TBD | % | TBD | % | TBD | % | TBD |
| Ojo Federal Constituency (Note: Comprising the local government area of Ojo.) | TBD | % | TBD | % | TBD | % | TBD | % | TBD |
| Oshodi-Isolo I Federal Constituency and Oshodi-Isolo II Federal Constituency (Note: Together comprising the local government area of Oshodi-Isolo.) | TBD | % | TBD | % | TBD | % | TBD | % | TBD |
| Somolu Federal Constituency (Note: Comprising the local government area of Somolu.) | TBD | % | TBD | % | TBD | % | TBD | % | TBD |
| Surulere I Federal Constituency and Surulere II Federal Constituency (Note: Together comprising the local government area of Surulere.) | TBD | % | TBD | % | TBD | % | TBD | % | TBD |
| Totals | TBD | % | TBD | % | TBD | % | TBD | % | TBD |

==== By local government area ====
The results of the election by local government area.

| LGA | Babajide Sanwo-Olu APC | | Gbadebo Rhodes-Vivour LP | | Abdul-Azeez Olajide Adediran PDP | | Others | | Total Valid Votes | Turnout Percentage |
| LGA | Votes | Percentage | Votes | Percentage | Votes | Percentage | Votes | Percentage | Total Valid Votes | Turnout Percentage |
|---|---|---|---|---|---|---|---|---|---|---|
| Agege | TBD | % | TBD | % | TBD | % | TBD | % | TBD | % |
| Ajeromi-Ifelodun | TBD | % | TBD | % | TBD | % | TBD | % | TBD | % |
| Alimosho | TBD | % | TBD | % | TBD | % | TBD | % | TBD | % |
| Amuwo-Odofin | TBD | % | TBD | % | TBD | % | TBD | % | TBD | % |
| Apapa | TBD | % | TBD | % | TBD | % | TBD | % | TBD | % |
| Badagry | TBD | % | TBD | % | TBD | % | TBD | % | TBD | % |
| Ejigbo | TBD | % | TBD | % | TBD | % | TBD | % | TBD | % |
| Epe | TBD | % | TBD | % | TBD | % | TBD | % | TBD | % |
| Eti-Osa | TBD | % | TBD | % | TBD | % | TBD | % | TBD | % |
| Ibeju-Lekki | TBD | % | TBD | % | TBD | % | TBD | % | TBD | % |
| Ifako-Ijaiye | TBD | % | TBD | % | TBD | % | TBD | % | TBD | % |
| Ikeja | TBD | % | TBD | % | TBD | % | TBD | % | TBD | % |
| Ikorodu | TBD | % | TBD | % | TBD | % | TBD | % | TBD | % |
| Kosofe | TBD | % | TBD | % | TBD | % | TBD | % | TBD | % |
| Lagos Island | TBD | % | TBD | % | TBD | % | TBD | % | TBD | % |
| Lagos Mainland | TBD | % | TBD | % | TBD | % | TBD | % | TBD | % |
| Mushin | TBD | % | TBD | % | TBD | % | TBD | % | TBD | % |
| Ojo | TBD | % | TBD | % | TBD | % | TBD | % | TBD | % |
| Oshodi-Isolo | TBD | % | TBD | % | TBD | % | TBD | % | TBD | % |
| Somolu | TBD | % | TBD | % | TBD | % | TBD | % | TBD | % |
| Surulere | TBD | % | TBD | % | TBD | % | TBD | % | TBD | % |
| Totals | TBD | % | TBD | % | TBD | % | TBD | % | TBD | % |

== See also ==
- 2023 Nigerian elections
- 2023 Nigerian gubernatorial elections
