= 2023 Nigerian presidential election in Lagos State =

- 25 February 2023
- Registered: 7,060,195
- Turnout: 18.92%
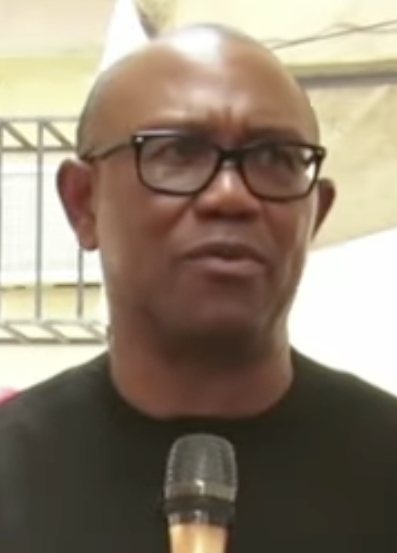

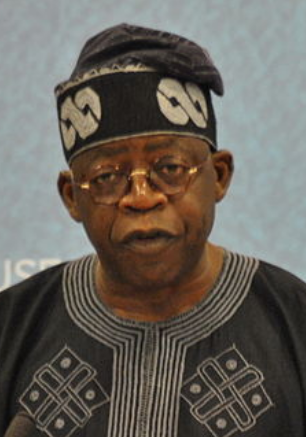

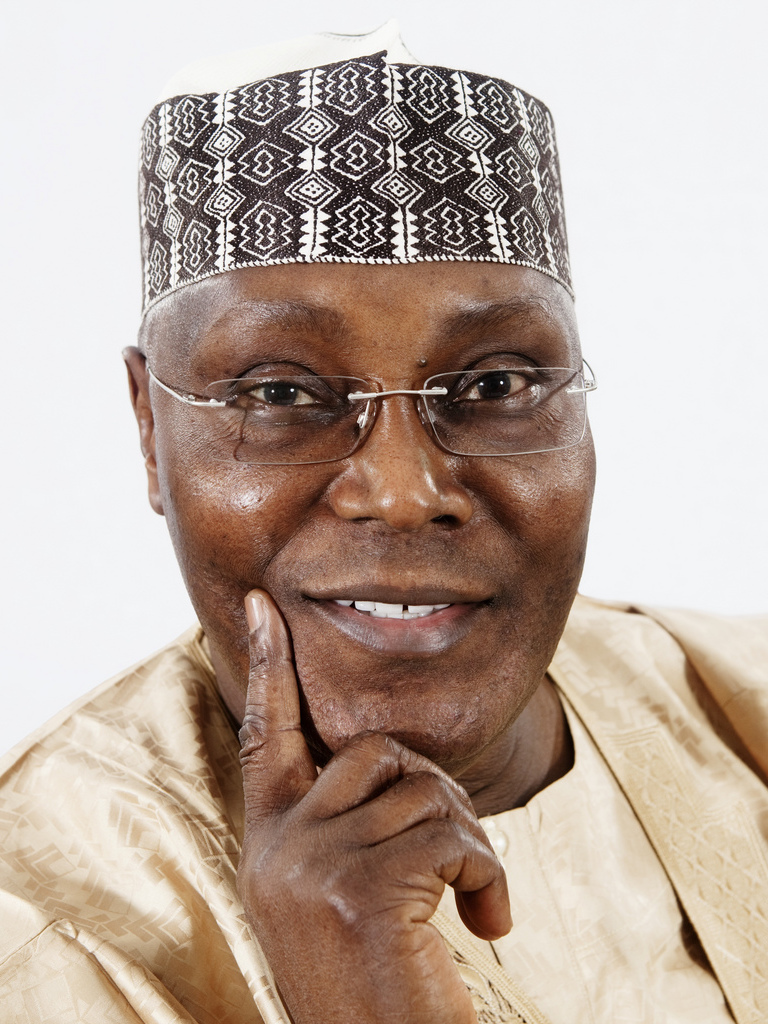
Nominee	Peter Obi	Bola Tinubu	Atiku Abubakar
Party	LP	APC	PDP
Home state	Anambra	Lagos	Adamawa
Running mate	Yusuf Datti Baba-Ahmed	Kashim Shettima	Ifeanyi Okowa
Popular vote	582,454	572,606	75,750
Percentage	45.81%	45.04%	5.96%
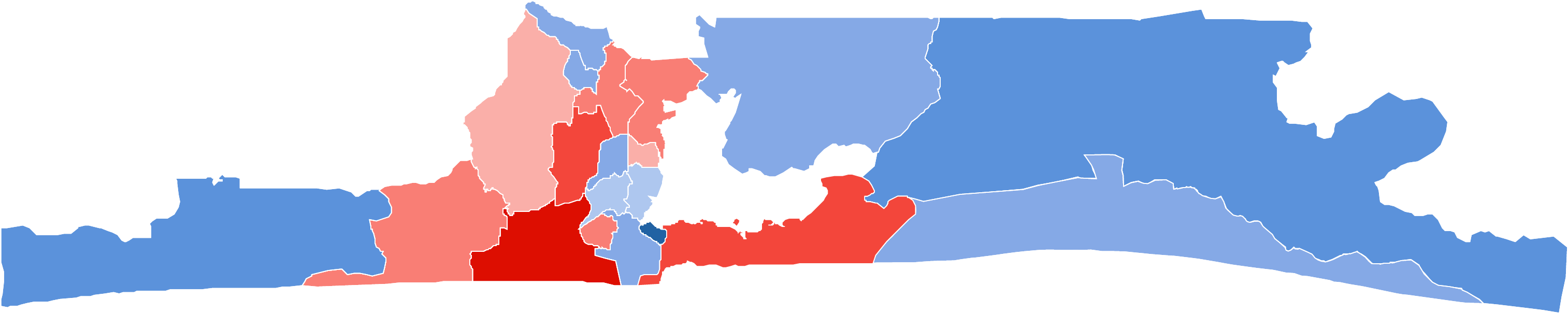
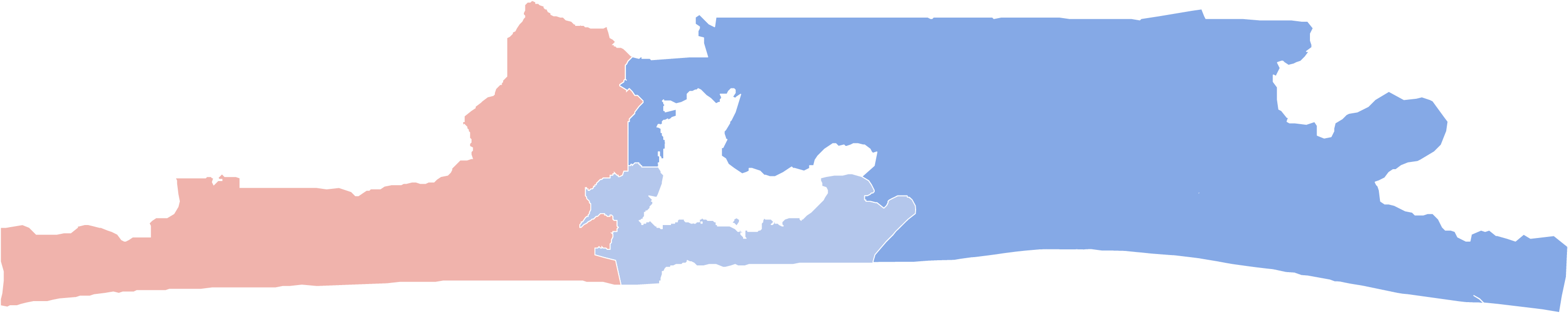
- Results Tinubu: 40–50% 50–60% 60–70% 70–80% 80–90% Obi: 40–50% 50–60% 60–70% 70–80%
President before election
Muhammadu Buhari
APC
Elected President
Bola Tinubu
APC

The 2023 Nigerian presidential election in Lagos State was held on 25 February 2023 as part of the nationwide 2023 Nigerian presidential election to elect the president and vice president of Nigeria. Other federal elections, including elections to the House of Representatives and the Senate, were also held on the same date while state elections will be held two weeks afterward on 11 March.

Peter Obi—the nominee of the Labour Party—won the state by nearly 10,000 votes, a 0.77% margin, in a massive upset over former state Governor Bola Tinubu of the All Progressives Congress. The other two major contenders, Atiku Abubakar (Peoples Democratic Party) and Rabiu Kwankwaso (New Nigeria Peoples Party), trailed with just 5.96% and 0.66%, respectively.

== Background ==
Lagos State is a highly populated, diverse southwestern state that is a major financial centre along with being a key culture, education, and transportation hub. Although it faces overcrowding and chronic debilitating traffic, it has grown to one of the largest economies in Africa.

Politically, the 2019 elections were a continuation of the state APC's control as Muhammadu Buhari won the state by 12% and the party held all three senate seats while gaining in the House of Representatives elections. On the state level, the APC also retained its House of Assembly majority but the gubernatorial election was prefaced by the unprecedented defeat of incumbent Akinwunmi Ambode in the APC primary, marking the first time an incumbent Nigerian governor was defeated in a party primary. His primary challenger, Babajide Sanwo-Olu, went on to win the general election by a wide 54% margin.

== Campaign ==
Although Lagos State is the home state of Tinubu, both Abubakar and Obi pushed to make the state competitive by targeting certain demographics and using the downballot candidates of their respective parties to lead the direct grassroots campaign. As a state in the ethnic Yoruba homeland of Yorubaland, most of Lagos State's indigenous population are ethnic Yoruba but over a century of internal migration led to a significant minority of non-Yoruba non-indigenes. These differing ethnic dynamics greatly affected the presidential campaign in the state as Tinubu (an ethnic Yoruba himself) and his surrogates extensively employed ethnic Yoruba identity politics while campaigning across the South West; on the other hand, the Lagos State bases of both Abubakar and Obi are in the non-indigene community—primarily those originally from the South East or South South—along with youths and educated professionals of all ethnicities.

Soon after the campaign period began in September 2022, reports from the LP and the PDP emerged over continuous attempts at suppression from APC-backed assailants along with bias from the state government and local police. Notable incidents included an ambush on the state PDP campaign convoy in Badagry in October and an attack on Obi-aligned free medical services in Eti-Osa in November. The reports led to fears of electoral violence and voter suppression, with analysts noting the regular reports of suppression and violence from the recent elections in the state (especially in areas with a non-Yoruba majority). As the campaign continued into December, the administration of state governor Babajide Sanwo-Olu (APC)—a longtime Tinubu ally—was accused of abusing the power of government for political purposes after reports found that the Lagos State Traffic Management Authority was selectively closing roads and diverting traffic for only APC campaign events. As the election neared in January, suppression reports increased rapidly with both the LP and PDP accusing the state government and APC of destroying opposition banners and posters, attacking and intimidating of opposition supporters, and continued prevention of using billboards with the LP even claiming that the APC had infiltrated local INEC offices to discard the Permanent Voter Cards of non-indigenes.

While both SBM Intelligence and ThisDay projected Tinubu to win Lagos State in December 2022, other pundits noted the potential competitiveness of the state with The Africa Report including it in a series on battleground states. The article contended that Tinubu would benefit from the support of the state and federal government in the state, both from the ability to suppress opposition voters and recent infrastructure projects. (Note: Most notably, the Lekki Deep Sea Port and Lagos Rail Mass Transit Blue Line which were both inaugurated in January 2023.) For Abubakar, reporting focused on the divides within the PDP as the national split between the G5 and the rest of the party had trickled down to the Lagos State PDP as longtime state PDP stalwart Bode George sided with the G5 in its opposition to Abubakar. The split in the state PDP had its gubernatorial nominee—Abdul-Azeez Olajide Adediran—campaigning for Abubakar while George reportedly backed Obi and LP gubernatorial nominee Gbadebo Rhodes-Vivour. The report claimed Obi's chances were based on his campaign's ability to successfully turnout non-indigenes (Note: Especially in the vital, non-indigene-heavy local government areas of Ajeromi-Ifelodun, Amuwo-Odofin, Ojo, Oshodi-Isolo, and Surulere.) and educated youths along with the vital assistance of Rhodes-Vivour.

In early February, Lagos State polling data and analysis from Stears Business was released with results showed a 4% lead for Obi, its model based on the polling statistics predicted Obi to win the state with 44% of the vote with Tinubu trailing at 32% while Abubakar stood at just 7%. The Stears data revealed a stark religious divide as Obi led by 11% among Christian respondents while Tinubu led by 28% among Muslim respondents; other questions revealed that the respondents had high confidence in INEC and were more excited about the election than previous ones. In the following days other issues took precedence as allegations of bias against INEC Lagos State Resident Commissioner Olusegun Agbaje led to calls for his resignation while mass coordinated attacks on LP supporters before an Obi rally at Tafawa Balewa Square reinforced fears of further violence.

== Polling ==
Polling organisation/client	Fieldwork date	Sample size					Others	Undecided	Undisclosed	Not voting
Polling organisation/client	Fieldwork date	Sample size	Tinubu APC	Obi LP	Kwankwaso NNPP	Abubakar PDP	Others	Undecided	Undisclosed	Not voting
BantuPage	December 2022	N/A	28%	31%	1%	5%	–	14%	5%	16%
Nextier (Lagos crosstabs of national poll)	27 January 2023	N/A	25.2%	39.4%	0.5%	14.7%	3.2%	17.0%	–	–
Stears	January 2023	500	21%	25%	2%	3%	–	45%	–	6%
SBM Intelligence for EiE (Lagos crosstabs of national poll)	22 January-6 February 2023	N/A	63%	25%	–	10%	–	1%	–	–

== Projections ==
Source	Projection		As of
Africa Elects (Note: Africa Elects projections predict the likelihood of a candidate winning a state by categorizing a state as "Safe" for exceedingly likely, "Likely" for somewhat likely, and "Lean" for least likely. If no clear determination could be made, states are categorized as "tossups".)	Tossup		24 February 2023
Dataphyte (Note: Dataphyte projections predict candidates' projected votal shares in each state.)
Dataphyte	Tinubu:	44.61%	11 February 2023
Dataphyte	Obi:	18.53%	11 February 2023
Dataphyte	Abubakar:	21.21%	11 February 2023
Dataphyte	Others:	15.66%	11 February 2023
Enough is Enough- SBM Intelligence (Note: EiE-SBM projections predict which candidates will win states.)	Tinubu		17 February 2023
SBM Intelligence (Note: SBM projections predict which candidates will win states or, if no determination could be made, categorizes states as "Too close to call" (TCC).)	Tinubu		15 December 2022
ThisDay (Note: ThisDay projections predict candidates' projected votal shares in each state.)
ThisDay	Tinubu:	45%	27 December 2022
ThisDay	Obi:	25%	27 December 2022
ThisDay	Kwankwaso:	5%	27 December 2022
ThisDay	Abubakar:	20%	27 December 2022
ThisDay	Others/Undecided:	5%	27 December 2022
The Nation (Note: The Nation projections predict which candidates will win states or, if no determination could be made, categorizes states as "Battlegrounds.")	Tinubu		12-19 February 2023

== Conduct ==
=== Pre-election ===
In the months before the election, dozens of reports from civil society groups and journalists along with LP and PDP supporters raised alarms over electoral violence and other forms of voter suppression. Continuous attempts at suppression from APC-backed assailants along with bias from the state government and local police were reported throughout the campaign period. The reports led to fears of electoral violence and voter suppression, with analysts noting common reports of suppression and violence from other recent elections in the state (especially in areas predominantly populated by non-Yorubas). As the election neared in early 2023, suppression reports increased rapidly with both the LP and PDP accusing the state government and APC of destroying opposition banners and posters, attacking and intimidating of opposition supporters, and continued prevention of using billboards with the LP even claiming that the APC had infiltrated local INEC offices to discard the Permanent Voter Cards of non-indigenes. These allegations of INEC infiltration were exacerbated by controversies surrounding INEC Resident Commissioner Olusegun Agbaje; while some groups called for Agbaje to resign in the wake of perceived anti-Igbo statements, most criticism was leveled against him due to his decision to use the Lagos State Park and Garage Management Committee to transport election materials and personnel on Election Day. The parks committee is chaired by MC Oluomo—a APC presidential campaign committee member, powerful agbero, and accused organizer of electoral violence—thus opposition questioned the commissioner's neutrality amid calls for his resignation. In the same regard, civil society groups noted risks of electoral interference in Lagos State with YIAGA Africa's Election Manipulation Risks Index placing the state as "High Risk" for manipulation. (Note: The index labeled Lagos State with five of the six potential manipulation variables: INEC Capture, tampering with the voter register, voter suppression, resistance to election technology, and a history of election fraud.)

== General election ==
=== Results ===
2023 Nigerian presidential election in Lagos State
Party	Candidate	Votes	%
A	Christopher Imumolen		
AA	Hamza al-Mustapha		
ADP	Yabagi Sani		
APP	Osita Nnadi		
AAC	Omoyele Sowore		
ADC	Dumebi Kachikwu		
APC	Bola Tinubu		
APGA	Peter Umeadi		
APM	Princess Chichi Ojei		
BP	Sunday Adenuga		
LP	Peter Obi		
NRM	Felix Johnson Osakwe		
New Nigeria Peoples Party	Rabiu Kwankwaso		
PRP	Kola Abiola		
PDP	Atiku Abubakar		
SDP	Adewole Adebayo		
YPP	Malik Ado-Ibrahim		
ZLP	Dan Nwanyanwu		
Total votes			100.00%
Invalid or blank votes			N/A
Turnout			

==== By senatorial district ====
The results of the election by senatorial district.

Senatorial District	Bola Tinubu APC		Atiku Abubakar PDP		Peter Obi LP		Rabiu Kwankwaso NNPP		Others		Total valid votes
Senatorial District	Votes	%	Votes	%	Votes	%	Votes	%	Votes	%	Total valid votes
Lagos Central Senatorial District (Note: Comprising the local government areas of Apapa, Eti-Osa, Lagos Island, Lagos Mainland, and Surulere.)	117,580	47.44%	14,543	5.87%	108,633	43.83%	1,497	0.60%	5,614	2.26%	247,867
Lagos East Senatorial District (Note: Comprising the local government areas of Epe, Ibeju-Lekki, Ikorodu, Kosofe, and Somolu.)	149,667	50.45%	19,565	6.60%	118,348	39.89%	1,958	0.66%	7,112	2.40%	296,650
Lagos West Senatorial District (Note: Comprising the local government areas of Agege, Ajeromi-Ifelodun, Alimosho, Amuwo-Odofin, Badagry, Ifako-Ijaiye, Ikeja, Mushin, Ojo, and Oshodi-Isolo.)	289,288	41.68%	40,713	5.87%	340,446	49.05%	4,859	0.70%	18,796	2.71%	694,102
Totals	572,606	45.04%	75,750	5.96%	582,454	45.81%	8,442	0.66%	32,199	2.53%	1,271,451

==== By federal constituency ====
The results of the election by federal constituency.

Federal Constituency	Bola Tinubu APC		Atiku Abubakar PDP		Peter Obi LP		Rabiu Kwankwaso NNPP		Others		Total valid votes
Federal Constituency	Votes	%	Votes	%	Votes	%	Votes	%	Votes	%	Total valid votes
Agege Federal Constituency (Note: Comprising the local government area of Agege.)	29,568	58.10%	4,498	8.84%	13,270	26.08%	1,513	2.97%	2,043	4.01%	50,892
Ajeromi/Ifelodun Federal Constituency (Note: Comprising the local government area of Ajeromi-Ifelodun.)	25,938	37.82%	4,680	6.82%	35,663	51.99%	436	0.64%	1,873	2.73%	68,590
Alimosho Federal Constituency (Note: Comprising the local government area of Alimosho.)	62,909	42.54%	8,201	5.55%	71,327	48.24%	701	0.47%	4,732	3.20%	147,870
Amuwo Odofin Federal Constituency (Note: Comprising the local government area of Amuwo-Odofin.)	13,318	18.24%	2,383	3.26%	55,547	76.09%	330	0.45%	1,429	1.96%	73,007
Apapa Federal Constituency (Note: Comprising the local government area of Apapa.)	15,471	56.86%	2,997	11.01%	7,566	27.80%	338	1.24%	840	3.09%	27,212
Badagry Federal Constituency (Note: Comprising the local government area of Badagry.)	31,903	63.03%	6,024	11.9%	10,956	21.64%	153	0.30%	1,582	3.13%	50,618
Epe Federal Constituency (Note: Comprising the local government area of Epe.)	19,867	67.98%	5,221	17.87%	3,497	11.97%	76	0.26%	561	1.92%	29,222
Eti-Osa Federal Constituency (Note: Comprising the local government area of Eti-Osa.)	15,317	24.46%	3,369	5.38%	42,388	67.69%	381	0.61%	1,162	1.86%	62,617
Ibeju-Lekki Federal Constituency (Note: Comprising the local government area of Ibeju-Lekki.)	14,685	51.88%	2,329	8.23%	10,410	36.78%	104	0.37%	776	2.74%	28,304
Ifako/Ijaiye Federal Constituency (Note: Comprising the local government area of Ifako-Ijaiye.)	14,685	51.88%	2,329	8.23%	10,410	36.78%	104	0.37%	776	2.74%	28,304
Ikeja Federal Constituency (Note: Comprising the local government area of Ikeja.)	21,276	38.64%	2,280	4.14%	30,004	54.49%	337	0.61%	1,165	2.12%	55,062
Ikorodu Federal Constituency (Note: Comprising the local government area of Ikorodu.)	50,353	58.05%	4,508	5.20%	28,951	33.37%	400	0.46%	2,535	2.92%	86,747
Kosofe Federal Constituency (Note: Comprising the local government area of Kosofe.)	36,883	40.81%	4,058	4.49%	46,554	51.51%	902	1.00%	1,977	2.19%	90,374
Lagos Island I Federal Constituency and Lagos Island II Federal Constituency (Note: Together comprising the local government area of Lagos Island.) (Note: These two constituencies are within a single LGA. As this table does not differentiate between intra-LGA results, these figures are for the entire LGA which is the same as the data for both constituencies.)	27,760	81.92%	2,521	7.44%	3,058	9.03%	79	0.23%	468	1.38%	33,886
Lagos Mainland Federal Constituency (Note: Comprising the local government areas of Lagos Mainland.)	20,030	46.43%	3,005	6.96%	18,698	43.34%	257	0.60%	1,153	2.67%	43,143
Mushin I Federal Constituency and Mushin II Federal Constituency (Note: Together comprising the local government area of Mushin.)	41,907	58.85%	3,478	4.88%	23,390	32.84%	410	0.58%	2,030	2.85%	71,215
Ojo Federal Constituency (Note: Comprising the local government area of Ojo.)	20,603	31.61%	3,701	5.68%	38,859	59.63%	462	0.71%	1,543	2.37%	65,168
Oshodi-Isolo I Federal Constituency and Oshodi-Isolo II Federal Constituency (Note: Together comprising the local government area of Oshodi-Isolo.)	27,181	32.60%	3,139	3.76%	51,020	61.19%	413	0.50%	1,623	3.76%	83,376
Somolu Federal Constituency (Note: Comprising the local government area of Somolu.)	27,879	44.96%	3,449	5.56%	28,936	46.67%	476	0.77%	1,263	2.04%	62,003
Surulere I Federal Constituency and Surulere II Federal Constituency (Note: Together comprising the local government area of Surulere.)	39,002	48.15%	2,651	3.27%	36,923	45.58%	442	0.55%	1,991	2.46%	81,009
Totals	572,606	45.04%	75,750	5.96%	582,454	45.81%	8,442	0.66%	32,199	2.53%	1,271,451

==== By local government area ====
The results of the election by local government area.

Local government area	Bola Tinubu APC		Atiku Abubakar PDP		Peter Obi LP		Rabiu Kwankwaso NNPP		Others		Total valid votes	Turnout (%)
Local government area	Votes	%	Votes	%	Votes	%	Votes	%	Votes	%	Total valid votes	Turnout (%)
Agege	29,568	58.10%	4,498	8.84%	13,270	26.08%	1,513	2.97%	2,043	4.01%	50,892	14.71%
Ajeromi-Ifelodun	25,938	37.82%	4,680	6.82%	35,663	51.99%	436	0.64%	1,873	2.73%	68,590	16.85%
Alimosho	62,909	42.54%	8,201	5.55%	71,327	48.24%	701	0.47%	4,732	3.20%	147,870	18.49%
Amuwo-Odofin	13,318	18.24%	2,383	3.26%	55,547	76.09%	330	0.45%	1,429	1.96%	73,007	23.18%
Apapa	15,471	56.86%	2,997	11.01%	7,566	27.80%	338	1.24%	840	3.09%	27,212	26.21%
Badagry	31,903	63.03%	6,024	11.9%	10,956	21.64%	153	0.30%	1,582	3.13%	50,618	23.55%
Epe	19,867	67.98%	5,221	17.87%	3,497	11.97%	76	0.26%	561	1.92%	29,222	19.04%
Eti-Osa	15,317	24.46%	3,369	5.38%	42,388	67.69%	381	0.61%	1,162	1.86%	62,617	17.81%
Ibeju-Lekki	14,685	51.88%	2,329	8.23%	10,410	36.78%	104	0.37%	776	2.74%	28,304	25.59%
Ifako-Ijaiye	14,685	51.88%	2,329	8.23%	10,410	36.78%	104	0.37%	776	2.74%	28,304	25.59%
Ikeja	21,276	38.64%	2,280	4.14%	30,004	54.49%	337	0.61%	1,165	2.12%	55,062	17.83%
Ikorodu	50,353	58.05%	4,508	5.20%	28,951	33.37%	400	0.46%	2,535	2.92%	86,747	24.87%
Kosofe	36,883	40.81%	4,058	4.49%	46,554	51.51%	902	1.00%	1,977	2.19%	90,374	19.90%
Lagos Island	27,760	81.92%	2,521	7.44%	3,058	9.03%	79	0.23%	468	1.38%	33,886	17.46%
Lagos Mainland	20,030	46.43%	3,005	6.96%	18,698	43.34%	257	0.60%	1,153	2.67%	43,143	18.09%
Mushin	41,907	58.85%	3,478	4.88%	23,390	32.84%	410	0.58%	2,030	2.85%	71,215	18.20%
Ojo	20,603	31.61%	3,701	5.68%	38,859	59.63%	462	0.71%	1,543	2.37%	65,168	17.07%
Oshodi-Isolo	27,181	32.60%	3,139	3.76%	51,020	61.19%	413	0.50%	1,623	3.76%	83,376	18.96%
Somolu	27,879	44.96%	3,449	5.56%	28,936	46.67%	476	0.77%	1,263	2.04%	62,003	20.29%
Surulere	39,002	48.15%	2,651	3.27%	36,923	45.58%	442	0.55%	1,991	2.46%	81,009	22.59%
Totals	572,606	45.04%	75,750	5.96%	582,454	45.81%	8,442	0.66%	32,199	2.53%	1,271,451	18.92%

== See also ==
- 2023 Lagos State elections
- 2023 Nigerian presidential election
