= Kaiyetoro Eleko Beach =

Beach in Ibeju-Lekki, Lagos State, Nigeria

- Beach
- Location: Eleko, Ibeju-Lekki, Lagos State, Nigeria
- Water bodies: Atlantic Ocean

Kaiyetoro Eleko Beach is a beach located in the Eleko area of Ibeju-Lekki, Lagos State, Nigeria. Situated along the Atlantic Ocean coastline, the beach forms part of the wider Eleko coastal corridor, a region known for tourism, fishing activities, coastal settlements, and recreational use. It is part of the Eleko Beach tourism area, one of several coastal destinations on the Lekki Peninsula that have attracted visitors for recreation and leisure.

== Location ==
Kaiyetoro Eleko Beach is located within the Eleko community of Ibeju-Lekki in eastern Lagos State. The area lies along the Atlantic coastline and the Lekki–Epe growth corridor.

== Tourism ==
The Eleko coastline is a tourism destination in Lagos State. Studies on coastal tourism have highlighted the area’s recreational value, scenic environment, and role in attracting visitors seeking beach-related activities. Research on tourism development in Ibeju-Lekki has identified Eleko Beach as a contributor to local economic activity through tourism, hospitality services, transportation, and small-scale commercial enterprises.

== Environmental challenges ==
Like many beaches along the Lagos coastline, Kaiyetoro Eleko Beach is affected by coastal erosion, ocean surges, and environmental pressures associated with rapid urbanisation and climate change. Environmental reports have highlighted the vulnerability of coastal communities within the Eleko and Ibeju-Lekki axis to shoreline changes and flooding events resulting from rising sea levels and increased wave activity.

== Research and studies ==
Kaiyetoro Eleko Beach forms part of the Atlantic coastal environment studied by researchers examining tourism development, visitor satisfaction, and place attachment among beach users in Lagos State. Academic studies have also examined the socioeconomic effects of tourism in the Eleko area and the perceptions of residents regarding tourism development and coastal resource management.

== See also ==
- Eleko Beach
- Ibeju-Lekki
- Lekki Peninsula
- Tourism in Nigeria
- Climate change in Nigeria
