= Oladokun =

- Gender: Male
- Language: Yoruba

Origin
- Origin: Nigeria
- Meaning: Wealth has become like the ocean
- Region of origin: South-west Nigeria

Other names
- Short form: Ola

Oladokun audiois a Yoruba surname from Nigeria, meaning "Wealth has become like the ocean". It is derived from the components ọlá (wealth), dì (become), and òkun (ocean)

Notable people with the name include:

- Chris Oladokun (born 1997), American football player
- Jordan Oladokun (born 2002), American football player
- Joy Oladokun, singer, songwriter and folk musician
- Victor Oladokun, British Nigerian journalist
