= MC Oluomo =

Nigerian politician (born 1975)

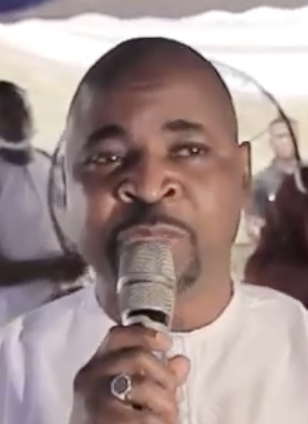
- Born: Musiliu Akinsanya; 14 March 1975 (age 51); Oshodi, Lagos
- Notable work: Head of the Lagos state branch of the National Union of Road Transport Workers

Musiliu Akinsanya (born 14 March 1975) popularly known as MC Oluomo is the head of the Lagos state branch of the National Union of Road Transport Workers. He is regarded as Lagos state's richest and most illustrious thug agbero.

MC Oluomo was born in Oshodi, Lagos, Nigeria. He originally hails from Lagos State. He had primary level of education and dropped out of school because of his father's death. He ran away from home at the age of 13 and started working as a bus driver. He became the head of a motor park in Oshodi and finally rose to become the most influential agbero in Oshodi before he emerged as the chairman of the National Union of Road Transport Workers in Lagos.

At an All Progressives Congress campaign event in Lagos in 2019, MC Oluomo was stabbed by someone thought to be loyal to the then outgoing Lagos State governor, Akinwumi Ambode whose re-election bid had been thwarted.

== Controversies ==
On 25 February 2023, in a series of videos on social media during the 2023 Nigerian presidential election in Lagos, Nigeria, MC Oluomo was accused of intimidating and preventing the Igbo people from voting for Peter Obi at his polling unit and using Area Boys (agbero) to disrupt the Nigerian presidential election in Lagos.

== Personal life ==
MC Oluomo has three wives and nine children.
