= Lagos State Ministry of Tourism and Inter-governmental Relations =

Ministry in Nigeria

Ministry overview
- Jurisdiction: Government of Lagos State
- Headquarters: State Government Secretariat, Alausa, Lagos State, Nigeria
- Ministry executive: Folorunso Folarin-Coker, Commissioner

The Lagos State Ministry of Tourism and Inter-Governmental Relations is the state government ministry, charged with the responsibility to plan, devise and implement the state policies on tourism and inter-governmental relations.

== See also ==
- Lagos State Ministry of Home Affairs and Culture
- Lagos State Executive Council
