= Apata Samuel Olu =

Nigerian politician

Hon. Apata Samuel Olu

Member, Lagos State House of Assembly
- Incumbent
- Assumed office 2023
- Constituency: Somolu Constituency II

Personal details
- Party: All Progressives Congress (APC)
- Occupation: Politician
- Website: Lagos Assembly Profile

Apata Samuel Olu (also known as Samuel Olufemi Apata) is a Nigerian politician who currently serves as a member of the Lagos State House of Assembly, representing Somolu Constituency II under the platform of the All Progressives Congress (APC).

== Political career ==
Apata Samuel Olu contested and won the seat to represent Somolu Constituency II in the Lagos State House of Assembly during the 2023 general elections on the platform of the All Progressives Congress.

Upon his inauguration into the 10th Assembly, he was appointed as the Chairman of the House Committee on Procurement. In this capacity, he oversees the activities of the Lagos State Public Procurement Agency, ensuring compliance with state procurement laws and advocating for transparency in government spending.
