= Olotu Ojo Emmanuel =

Nigerian politician

Hon. Olotu Ojo Emmanuel

Member of the Lagos State House of Assembly
- Incumbent
- Assumed office 2023
- Constituency: Ifako-Ijaiye Constituency II

Personal details
- Party: All Progressives Congress (APC)
- Occupation: Politician

Olotu Ojo Emmanuel is a Nigerian politician who currently serves as a member of the Lagos State House of Assembly, representing Ifako-Ijaiye Constituency II. He is the Chairman of the House Committee on Agriculture.

== Political career ==
Olotu Ojo Emmanuel participated in the 2023 general elections, running for the seat of Ifako-Ijaiye Constituency II. He was elected on the platform of the All Progressives Congress (APC), securing a mandate to represent his constituents in the 10th Legislative Assembly of Lagos State.

Upon the inauguration of the 10th Assembly, he was appointed as the Chairman of the House Committee on Agriculture. In this capacity, he oversees state policies regarding food security, farming initiatives, and agricultural development programs.
