= Ajayi Oladele Oluwadamilare =

Nigerian politician

Hon. Ajayi Oladele Oluwadamilare

Member, Lagos State House of Assembly
- Incumbent
- Assumed office 2023
- Constituency: Ibeju-Lekki Constituency II

Personal details
- Born: April 15, 1971 (age 54) Lagos State, Nigeria
- Party: All Progressives Congress (APC)
- Occupation: Politician, Administrator
- Website: Lagos Assembly Profile

Ajayi Oladele Oluwadamilare (born 15 April 1971) is a Nigerian politician and administrator who currently serves as a member of the Lagos State House of Assembly, representing Ibeju-Lekki Constituency II under the platform of the All Progressives Congress (APC).

== Early life ==
Ajayi Oladele was born on April 15, 1971, in Lagos State. He is a native of the Ibeju-Lekki area.

== Career ==
In the 2023 general elections, Oladele contested for the Ibeju-Lekki Constituency II seat and was elected on the platform of the All Progressives Congress (APC).

Upon the inauguration of the 10th Assembly, he was appointed as the Chairman of the House Committee on Central Business Districts (CBD).
