= Eleko Beach =

Beach in Nigeria

Coordinates: 6.4390°N 3.8550°E

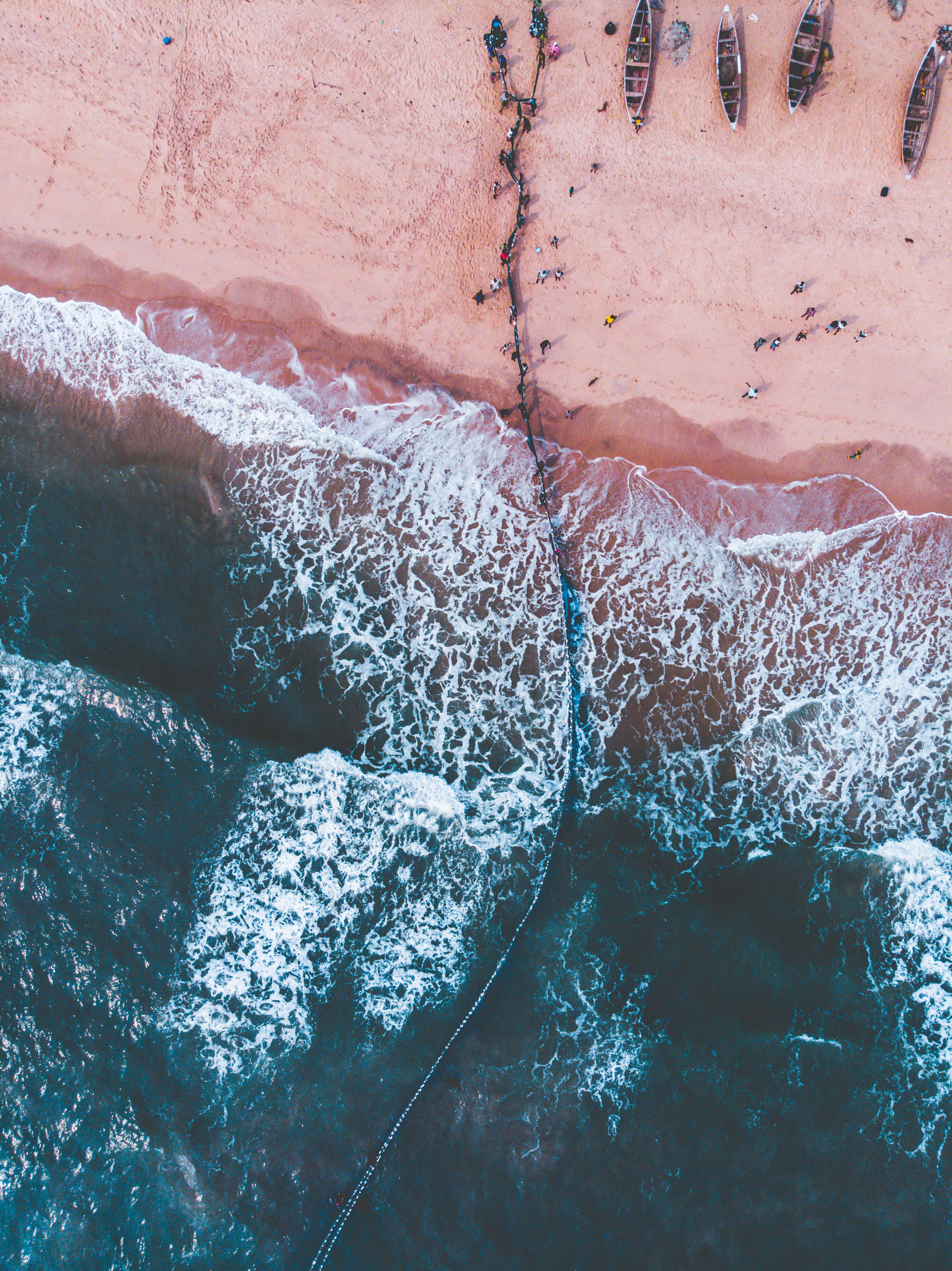
Fishermen fishing from the Atlantic Ocean on Eleko Shore

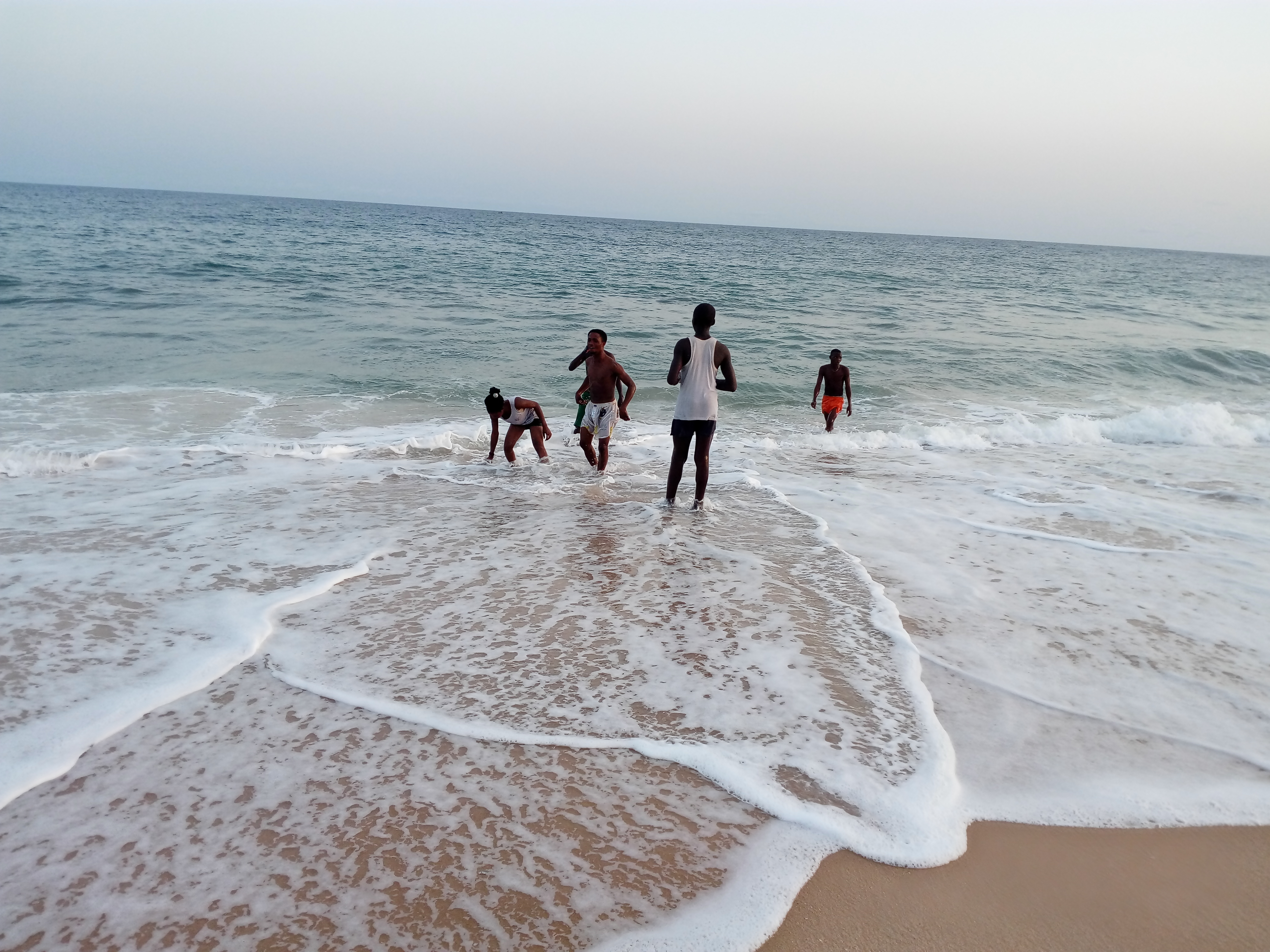
Eleko beach

Eleko Beach is a private beach in the Lekki peninsula, about 30 mi (48 km) east of Lagos Island in Nigeria. It opened in 1989. Eleko Beach is located in the Ibeju-lekki local Government area. Eleko is a small community located along the Lagos coastline. Eleko Beach stands out among the community's other natural blessings.

Eleko Beach offers many recreational activities. Visitors can rent a beach hut for the day and have someone prepare the grill for you. Eleko Beach is also home to a small market selling lively works of art but you will have to hire a taxi to get there.

== Climate and environmental issues ==
Eleko beach and its surrounding environment are faced with several environmental and ecological problems due to the effects of climate change. These problems include rising sea level, loss of natural shoreline, flooding, deforestation, waste management and sanitation issues. This has led to several cleanup initiatives organized within the Eleko community.
