= Adeyemi Benjamin Olabinjo =

Nigerian Politician

Benjamin Adeyemi Olabinjo (BAO) is a Nigerian politician and member of the House of Representatives of Nigeria representing the Ifako-Ijaiye Federal Constituency in Lagos State.
