= Abiodun Orekoya =

Nigerian politician

Abiodun Orekoya is a Nigerian politician. He currently serves as the representative of Somolu I constituency at the Lagos State House of Assembly.
