= Abdul-Azeez Olajide Adediran =

Nigerian politician and journalist

Jandor
- Born: 25 November 1977 (age 48)
- Education: The Polytechnic, Ibadan; Modul University Vienna; the Howard University School of Business; Oxford University.
- Occupations: Energy consultant (oil and gas and renewable Energy), Fintech, Communications . politician
- Spouse: Olubukola Funmilayo Olajide-Adediran
- Parent(s): Alhaji Adediran and Late Mrs.Ruth Oluwafunmilayo

Abdul-Azeez Olajide Adediran popularly known as Jandor, is a Nigerian politician, journalist, entrepreneur, and technocrat. He is the chairman of Datanet Project Services Ltd, The Flora Consult, Core Media Group and Halomax international Nigeria Ltd and founder, Lagosforlagos movement Lagos State. In 2023 general election, he was the Lagos state gubernatorial candidate under the People's Democratic Party with his running mate, Funke Akindele. He received the 2021 Honorary Doctorate in Leadership and Governance by South American University.

== Early life and education ==
Jandor was born to Alhaji Adediran and Ruth Oluwafunmilayo Adeniran on 25 November 1977 in Mushin Area of Lagos State. Jandor is a graduate of The Polytechnic Ibadan; Modul University, Vienna; the Howard University School of Business, Washington DC, USA; and Oxford University, Oxford, United Kingdom.

== Career ==
Jandor started his journalism career as a journalist for over twenty years. He eventually ventured into politics as a member of APC. He was the convener of the movement of Lagos4Lagos, a movement under the APC. He eventually defected to PDP and he is currently their gubernatorial candidate of the 2023 Lagos gubernatorial election.

== Personal life ==
He is married to Olubukola Funmilayo Olajide-Adediran. His two children: Fareedah Oluwamayokun Amoke and Fadhilulah Oluwamurewa Adedayo Akanniade Olajide-Adediran.
