= 2011 Lagos State gubernatorial election =

State election in Nigeria

- 26 April 2011
Nominee	Babatunde Fashola	Shamsideen Adegboye
Party	ACN	PDP
Running mate	Adejoke Orelope-Adefulire
Popular vote	1,509,113	300,450
Governor before election
Babatunde Fashola
ACN
Elected Governor
Babatunde Fashola
ACN

The 2011 Lagos State gubernatorial election was the seventh gubernatorial election of Lagos State. Held on 26 April 2011, the Action Congress of Nigeria nominee Babatunde Fashola won the election, defeating Shamsideen Adegboye of the People's Democratic Party.

== Results ==
A total of 15 candidates contested in the election. Babatunde Fashola from the Action Congress of Nigeria won the election, defeating Shamsideen Adegboye from the People's Democratic Party. Valid votes was 1,862,513.

2011 Lagos State gubernatorial election
Party	Candidate	Votes	%	±%
ACN	Babatunde Fashola	1,509,113	81.03	
PDP	Shamsideen Adegboye	300,450	16.13	
ACN hold				
