= National Union of Road Transport Workers =

Nigerian trade union

The National Union of Road Transport Workers is an independent Nigerian trade union that serves the interests of transport workers in the road transport sector, by calling for collective obtaining and pushing for social stability for all workers in the transport sector as defined in its constitution.

The union was founded in 1978, when the government of Nigeria merged the following unions:

- Amalgamated Union of Lagos Municipal Bus Workers
- Ance Transport Service Workers' Union
- Arab Trans Workers' Union
- Benson Transport Workers' Union
- Cross River State Transport and Allied Workers' Union
- H. Safieddine Transport Limited Workers' Union
- Hope Rising Drivers' Union
- Ikot Ekpene Divisional Transport Workers' Union
- Jam Iyyan Alhin Diraibobiw Arewa Northern Transport Workers' Union
- Mid-West Line and Armels Transport Workers' Union
- M/S Fawaz (Nigeria) Limited and Allied Workers' Union
- Rivers State Transport Corporation and Allied Workers' Union
- Tractors Drivers' Union
- Trans Continental (Nigeria) Ltd. Workers' Union

The union affiliated to the Nigeria Labour Congress. By 1988, it had 30,000 members, and by 2005, this had grown to 96,000.

The union has been known for controversial practices including corruption, extortion, and nepotism, exposed by the American-British journalist Louis Theroux in his 2010 documentary film.
