= Lagos State Ministry of Home Affairs and Culture =

Ministry in Nigeria

Lagos State Ministry of Home Affairs

Ministry overview
- Jurisdiction: Government of Lagos State
- Headquarters: State Government Secretariat, Alausa, Lagos State, Nigeria
- Ministry executives: hon. prince Anofiu Olanrewaju Elegushi, Commissioner; Hon. Jebe Abdullahi Kolawole, Special Adviser to the governor on Islamic matters; Rev. Adebukola Adeleke, Special Adviser to the Governor on Christian matters

The Lagos State Ministry of Home Affairs and Culture is the state government ministry, charged with the responsibility to plan, devise and implement the state policies on Home Affairs and Culture.

== See also ==
- Lagos State Executive Council
