= Somolu =

- LGA and neighbourhood
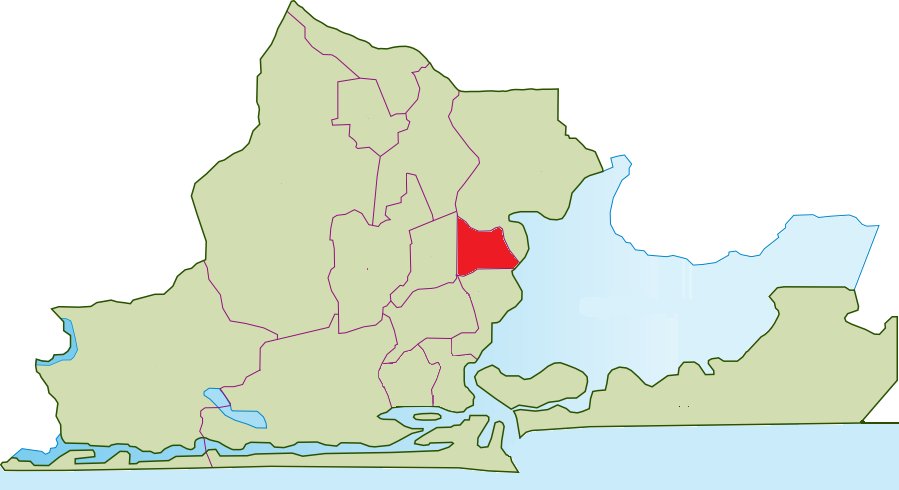
- Location in Lagos
- Interactive map of Somolu
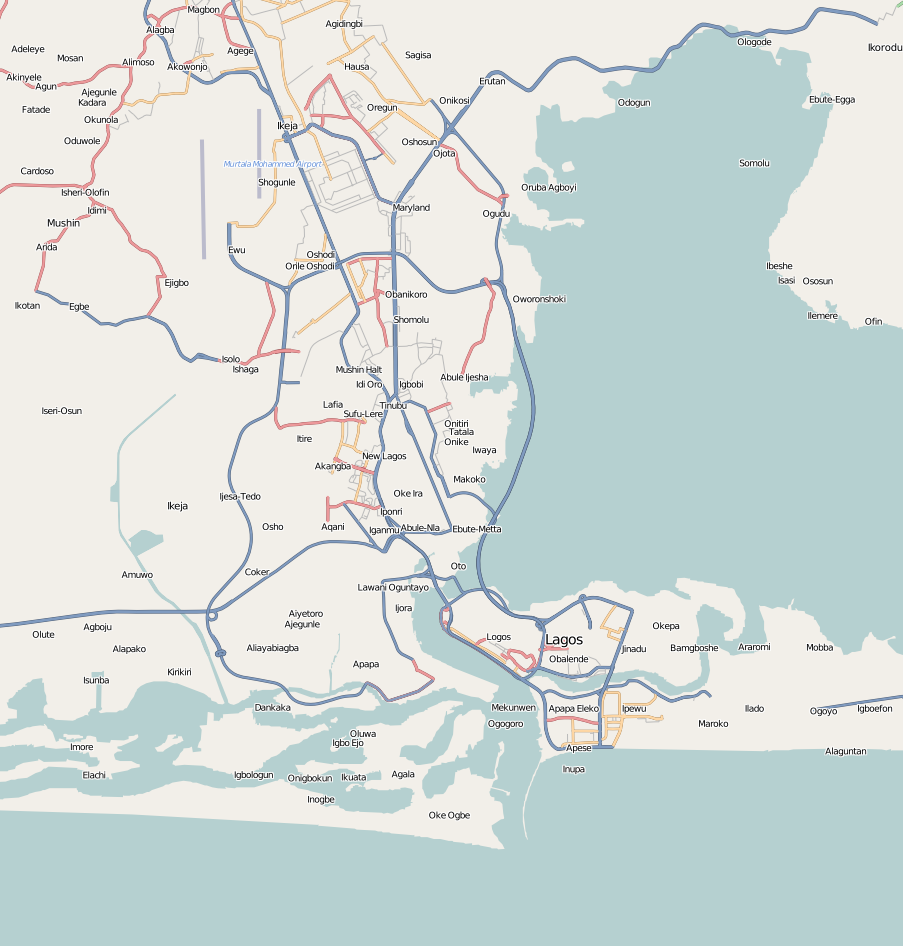
- Location in Lagos
- Coordinates: 6°32′27″N 3°23′14″E
- Country: Nigeria
- State: Lagos State
- City: Lagos
- Established after break from Mushin District Council: May 27, 1976

Government
  - Chairman: Hon. Lateef Ashimi
  - Member of State House of Assembly: Abiodun Orekoya

Area
  - Total: 14.6 km^{2} (5.6 sq mi)
- Elevation: 5 m (16 ft)

Population (2022)
  - Total: 597,400
  - Density: 40,900/km^{2} (106,000/sq mi)
- Time zone: UTC+1 (WAT)

Somolu (or Shomolu) is a neighbourhood in Lagos and a local government area (LGA) in Lagos State. Its administrative headquarters is located on Durosimi Street. Somolu Local Government is part of the Lagos East Senatorial Zone and a lawmaker represents the district at the Federal House of Representatives. Somolu is plagued by problems of poor sanitation, high rent, overall poverty, and youth criminal subculture. It is also known for its printing industry, which is the largest in Lagos and one of the most diverse in the world. Most notably, offset and digital print shops can be found both off and on Bajulaiye Road as well as Oguntolu and many more.

It had a population of 403,569 in 2006, according to the Nigerian State Population Census. Although, this number is likely not entirely accurate since it was calculated by finding the population of Lagos proper then using geospatial data to identify the populations the individual local government areas, and there are disputes as to the number for Lagos overall as well. The governor of Lagos State, Bola Tinubu, claimed that a census conducted by the National Population Commission and Lagos at the same time placed the population of the state at upwards of 17.5 million. The 2006 census found Lagos' population to be approximately 9 million. The most prominent ethnic group is the Yorubas, which are mostly made up of the Egbas, Aworis, Ijebus and Ilajes.

Somolu is classified as a third-tier of government and the most prevalent language is Yoruba, although English and Nigerian has become more common for communication between the Yoruba people and other ethnic groups. It is about 14.6 km^{2} in overall size. It is 5 m (16 ft) above sea level. It is one of 774 local government areas in Nigeria and 20 in Lagos. It has a very high occupancy ratio and its land is predominantly dedicated to residential construction with very little dedicated to other industries. Somolu LGA is partitioned into 8 communities, which exist under 8 administrative wards; the communities are Onipanu, Okesuna/Alase, Igbari, Fadeyi/Igbobi, Bashua, Orile/Alade, Bajulaiye and Ijebu-Tedo. The 8 administrative wards operate above these communities and are labeled wards A, B, C, V, E, F, G, and H.

== History ==
Somolu local government was formed on May 27, 1976, from the former Mushin District Council as a direct result of the traditional rulers and upper class of the Somolu region lobbying for autonomy. It was originally named Mushin East Local Government Area. Somolu has grown vastly in recent years, owing in large part to its printing business which continues to draw large numbers of residents and businesspeople which in turn has led to a significant increase in rent costs. Now, Somolu is almost exclusively a printing town, and is constantly filled with noise from various machines, like power generators used to run printers. As with greater Lagos, Somolu has both suffered and benefited from rapid industrialisation and urbanisation; its benefits include the increase in capital and industry in the area, the sufferings include an overly dense population, poor infrastructure, tenuous employment and unemployment, poverty and poor health.

== Problems with youth crime ==
Gang culture is prominent in Somolu, particularly gangs such as the "Agberos" (Area Boys), who frequently collect tolls in public places, especially markets and bus stops, from citizens under duress, largely from threats of violence if the money is not paid. As such, touting, violence, and extortion have become commonplace amongst the larger youth population of Somolu. Youth who engage in these activities are referred to as "Touts", and also engage in activities such as street fighting, stealing, rape, and murder, among others. Touts credit themselves as the traditional owners of the land they control due to their heritage, separating them from Western gangs through this established connection with their land which they believe grants them a stronger claim to it. Their propensity for violence has created for them a hypermasculine, domineering perception by those outside of Tout subculture, which further enables their acts of aggression of violence, and they have a very layered system of military-esque hierarchy. Younger and/or newer members are required to unquestionably listen to and follow the orders of their seniors until they grow older or show exceptional skill or strength to differentiate themselves from less experienced members. Separate regions within Somolu are partitioned off and controlled by Oga Agberos (Area Boys Kingpins).

Touts identify each other using specific nicknames and communicate with each other with a constructed slang that usually presents itself as mixes of Yoruba and Nigerian or intoned Yoruban. Despite their combative nature, they work together in a tightly-knit network which enables them to maintain relationships and contacts as well as hold individual Agberos to account in situations where there are grievances or where someone is believed to have worked against the group.

Touts can generally be classified into two groups, separated by their living situation. Some are homeless and live on the streets in small groups of Touts. They might, on occasion, be able to afford a room to rent, but predominantly sleep on the streets. Others live with their parents and engage in Tout subculture through this. Much of the time they will be going against their parents' wishes in doing this. Occasionally, they may leave their homes to pursue the lifestyle of the former group, but largely remain living at home with their parents. They generally live similar daytime lifestyles to the homeless Touts, however with the additional security of secure housing and the ability to be financially dependent.

== Housing, sanitation and poverty problems ==
Nigeria has a very prevalent religious scepticism towards orthodox medicine, which leads rely to lean on prayer and the advice of their clerics when confronted with medical issues. Somolu only has eight maternity wards, and this, alongside its very patriarchal societal institutions, has created a significant and ongoing problem with stillbirths in the area.

In the greater Lagos area, accommodation for the poor makes up approximately 70% of the overall housing population. This is approximately 15 million people, which means there could be up to 2 or 3 million substandard housing units across the metropolis area of Lagos. Somolu, and the older areas of Mushin, are considered to be part of Lagos' greater metropolis area and suffer from this in the form of extensive overcrowding and informal shack housing arrangements. The Lagos State Urban Renewal Board was established in 1991 in order to combat this problem. It was restructured and renamed into the Lagos State Urban Renewal Authority (LASURA) in 2005. Onipanu, Pedro, Akoka and such areas follow standards of planning that ensure adequate living conditions and efficient region planning, but areas such as Ilaje and Bariga are more poorly planned structurally and ensure a lower standard of residential living. Somolu LGA has many storey buildings, which develops erect to attempt to meet accommodation demand. Bungalows, which are equally as abundant, are increasingly being bought out and demolished in order to construct more storey buildings.

Lagos metropolis is situated on a narrow coastal stretch adjacent to the Atlantic Ocean. Due to this, in recent years has undergone extensive processes of land cover changes in order to claim land for urban development; this is done through filling in floodplains and swamps. Of all the Lagos LGAs with coastlines, Somolu has 90% of its total area built up, the largest proportion, compared to the average of above 50%. Additionally, 100% of the wetlands in the Somolu area have been lost to construction from 1986-2006. This is in large part credited to the production of accommodation, largely rental, but additionally to the construction of roads and other means to broaden Somolu's network.

As a result of residents of Somolu being forced into slum residence and squatter accommodation, alongside large amounts of precarious employment and unemployment in the printing industry, the rate of crime perpetrated by residents of the area has increased. In the 2005 Nigerian Police Crime report, Somolu was found to be second in terms of frequency of crimes committed out of all crime reported in local government areas of Lagos. This is in combination with the proliferated culture of youth crime occurring across the area. Somolu additionally has architectural structures and development patterns that enable criminal activity, alongside the socio-economic conditions for the significant presence of crime. Abdul Hamed Salawu, the executive chairman of the Somolu Local Government, has taken a "tough on crime" approach to policing since taking office, decrying a number of times the violence of gangs and "cultist" groups, whilst promising to ensure that Somolu is free from crime in future. The Nigeria Police Force, including the Lagos State Police Command, have been subject to many complaints and protests in recent years on account of violence and sexual assault towards citizens and arrestees.

== Industries ==
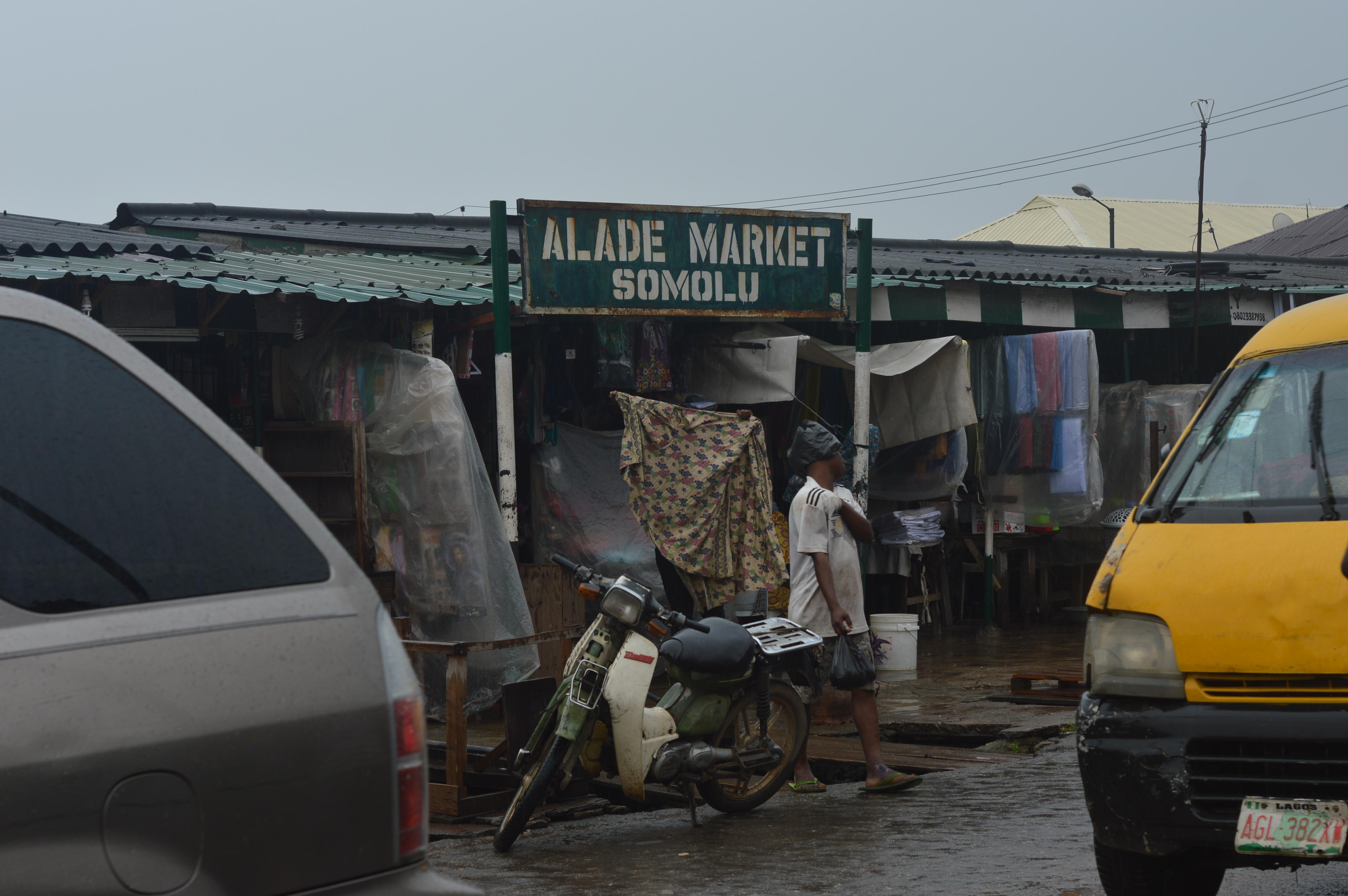
Alade Market in Somolu

Somolu’s printing industry is the largest in Nigeria, and among the most diverse in the world. The ubiquity of printing presses across the area has led to most buildings functioning as both commercial and residential architecture.This has led to a significant rise in rent costs in the area, keeping it insular, albeit very dense, despite this very strong printing market. As of 2010, the printing industry employed over 15,000 people in various roles. Oodua Trust has claimed that it has yet to be recognised as the largest employer of labour in Lagos outside of the state government, backed by Somolu having one of the largest, most dense populations of all the Lagos local government areas, albeit one whose population size and density can be misjudged due to the processes of official census’.

Due to its reputation as a printing region, law enforcement have been known to regularly, randomly raid various printing business across the area, which can frighten customers, scaring them away which in turn harms business. It is commonly believed that Somolu remains the last bastion of forgers from the now-demolished Oluwole Market, which was notorious for being the main hub of forgery in Lagos, which facilitated extensive and diverse work in counterfeiting and fraud. Some anonymous sources have attested to this, claiming that forgers arrive very early in the morning, usually around 1-3am, to print birth certificates, passports, foreign currency and other various documents. Additionally, it is claimed that they print a number of legal jobs in order to disguise their operations should it be ambushed.

Despite the printing industry dominating Somolu's workforce and forcing residential architecture to accommodate commercial interests, the industry still operates at a small scale. It is not cheaper to print within Somolu than it is in other countries or regions of Nigeria, nor is it cheaper for customers to purchase prints as opposed to from these alternate markets. This is on account of the lack of state government interest and aid for the industry. It has received little government funding since its emergence as a significant market, operating largely within itself.

A small community of chicken traders can also be found in the north of Somolu, mainly situated off Onipanu Junction.
