= Victor Oladokun =

British-Nigerian journalist (born 1958)

- Born: Victor Bandele Oladokun; London, England
- Education: Regent University; University of Ife Now Obafemi Awolowo University
- Occupations: Broadcaster; TV host; journalist; media consultant
- Years active: 1990–present
- Organization: Africa Development Bank Group
- Known for: Turning Point, CBN World News African Development Bank Group, Africa Investment Forum

Victor Oladokun (born Victor Bandele Oladokun) is a British-Nigerian journalist, broadcaster, media and corporate communications strategist and public relations professional. He served as Senior Advisor to the President of the African Development Bank Group (AfDB) and previously as the Bank's Director of Communication and External Relations. He was the producer, managing producer and host of the popular internationally acclaimed TV magazine programs CBN World News and Turning Point on the Christian Broadcasting Network CBN.

== Early life and education ==
Victor Oladokun is a dual British and Nigerian citizen. Born in London, England to a Nigerian Father and an Irish mother, he grew up in Liverpool and later on in Nigeria.

Oladokun holds a bachelor's degree in history and political science from the University of Ife (now Obafemi Awolowo University) in Nigeria. At Ife, he developed a fascination with the media and envisioned a future television and media landscape that included improved professional presentations, innovative programs, and inspirational content. He later earned a Master of Arts in communication and a Doctor of Strategic Leadership from the School of Business and Leadership at Regent University in Virginia Beach, Virginia.

== Career ==
=== Early corporate roles ===
Early in his career, Oladokun held senior leadership and communication positions in Nigeria. He served as Public Relations Manager for Cadbury Nigeria Limited and as Group PR Manager and spokesperson for the Leventis Group Nigeria.

=== Broadcasting ===
Oladokun worked as an international news journalist, news anchor, and managing producer at CBN International in Virginia Beach, Virginia. Alongside long-time co-host Kathy Edwards, he developed and produced international television programs, including CBN World News and Turning Point. During his time at CBN, he interviewed numerous global figures, including boxers Muhammad Ali, George Foreman, and Azumah Nelson; political leaders such as Thabo Mbeki and Cyril Ramaphosa of the African National Congress, Zulu Prime Minister and Inkatha Freedom Party President Mangosuthu Buthelezi, Nigerian President Olusegun Obasanjo, military Head of State General Ibrahim Babangida, Zambian Presidents Kenneth Kaunda, and Frederick Chiluba, Israeli Prime Minister Benjamin Netanyahu, PLO spokesperson Hanan Ashrawi, and Church of England envoy Terry Waite (kidnapped and held hostage in Lebanon). Other interviewees include CBN founder M.G. Pat Robertson, Myles Munroe, and entertainment figures such as Cissy Houston, Andraé Crouch, CeCe Winans, Robin Givens, and Ghanaian footballer Abedi Pele.

=== African Development Bank Group ===
Oladokun served as Director of Communication and External Relations at the African Development Bank Group (AfDB), later becoming Senior Advisor to the President Akinwumi Adesina . He is credited with transforming the bank's corporate communication architecture, including its strategies, structures, systems, and staffing, while repositioning the AfDB's brand at global and regional levels. He was a key member of the team that established the multi-partner Africa Investment Forum, which attracted over $200 billion in investor interests between 2018 and 2024.

=== Event moderation and public engagements ===
Oladokun is in high demand as a moderator for regional and global events. His engagements include the United Nations General Assembly; Africa Caucus Meetings of the World Bank Group and IMF; Korea-Africa Ministerial Summit; Africa Investment Forum; African Union summits; annual Korea Drone Show; Lagos Governorship Debates (2015 and 2019); The Platform Nigeria; COP 2022 in Sharm El Sheikh, Egypt; COP 2023 in the United Arab Emirates; 2023 Feed Africa Summit in Dakar, Senegal; and the Annual Meetings of the African Development Bank Group, among others. He moderated the 2019 and 2023 Lagos State Governorship Debate.

== Selected articles and publications ==
- Future of Drone Technology – in Thisday 21 Mar. 2019
- Africa: Saving Our Languages, Preserving Our Future
- Mr President: 7 things you must do now
- Echos of communism: The end of globalization?
- COVID-19: Why Africa Urgently Needs an Ubuntu Plan
- Locking down Africa now: There is no time for test runs
- The End of Social Conventions?
- Africa: Sports as a Business and a Brand

== See also ==
- Christian Broadcasting Network
- African Development Bank
