= Lagos State Traffic Management Authority =

Government agency of Lagos State, Nigeria

- Abbreviation: LASTMA
- Formation: 15 July 2000
- Type: Traffic Management Agency
- Purpose: To manage traffic in Lagos State, Nigeria.
- Headquarters: LSTC Building, Apapa-Oshodi expressway, Lagos
- Location: Oshodi, Lagos
- Official language: English
- GM/COO: Mr. Olalekan Bakare-Oki
- Parent organization: Lagos State Ministry of Transportation
- Website: Official website

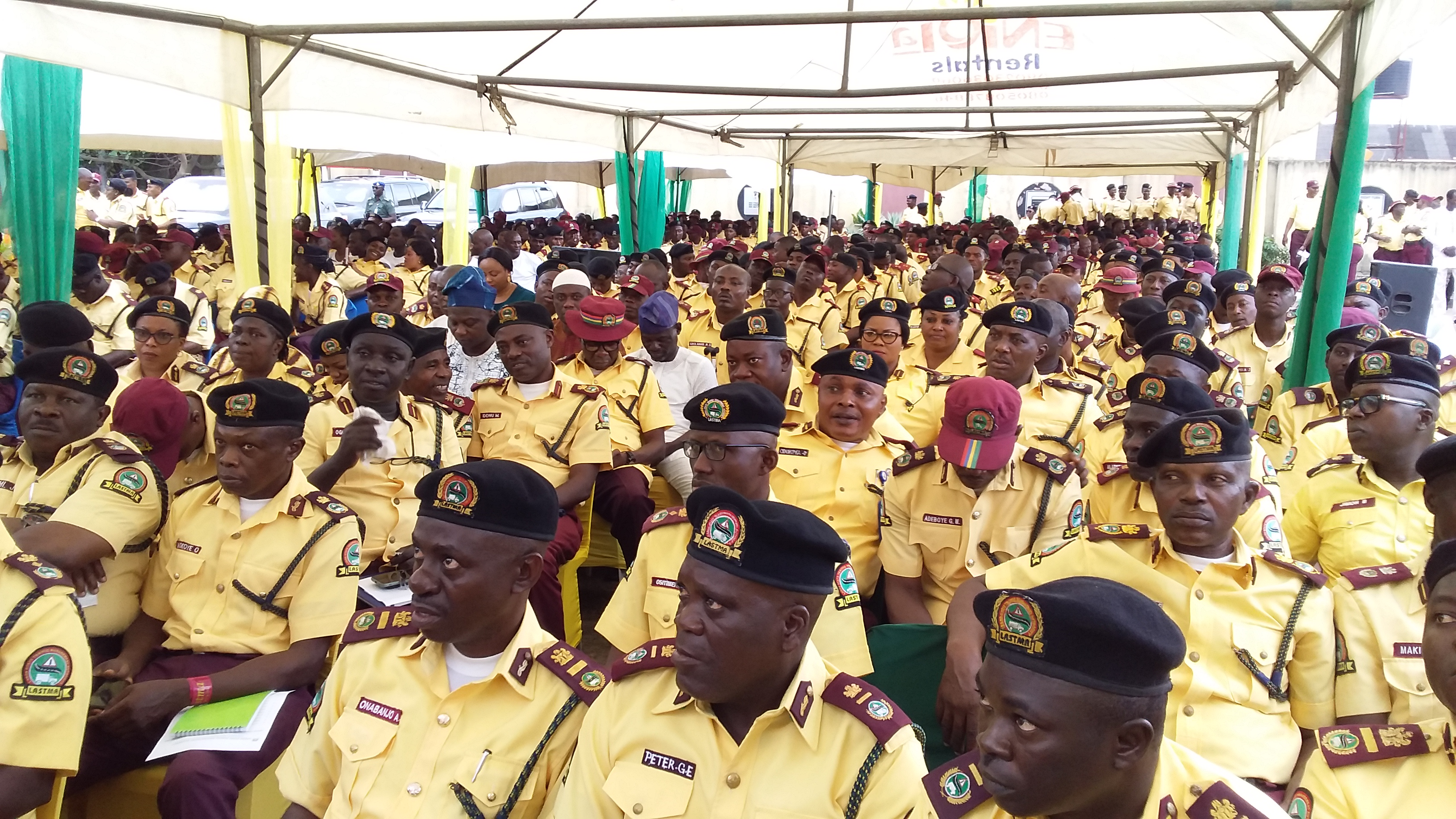

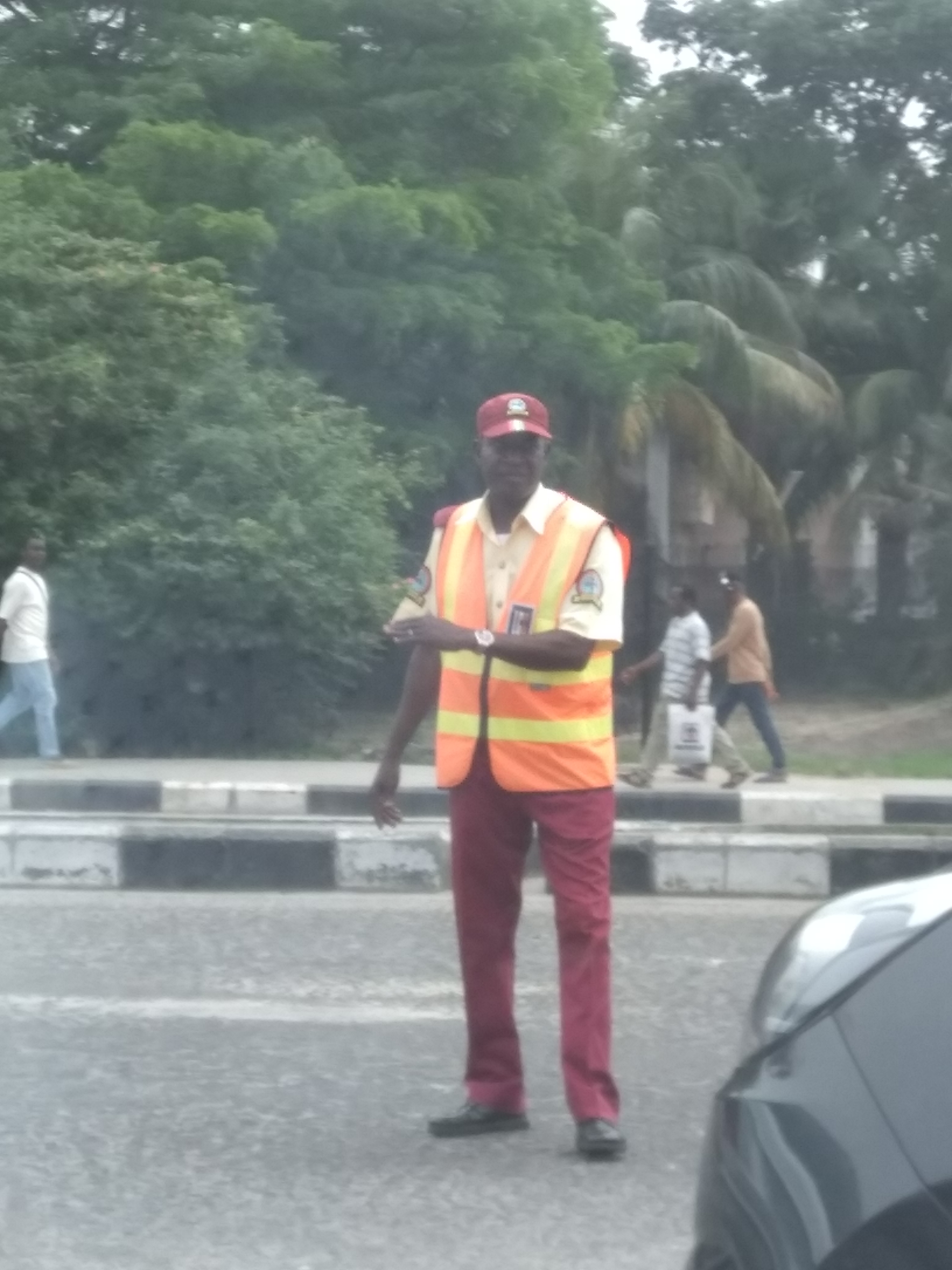
LASTMA official controlling traffic

Lagos State Traffic Management Authority is a Lagos state-owned agency under the Ministry of Transportation. The agency was established on the 15th of July, 2000 to transform the state transportation system to ensure free flow of traffic in the state, and also to reduce road accidents. The current head of the agency is Mr Olalekan Bakare-Oki.

== History ==
The Lagos State Traffic Management Authority, LASTMA for short, is a traffic management agency in Lagos State, Nigeria that was created by the former governor of the State, Asiwaju Bola Ahmed Tinubu to help maintain the level of sanity on Lagos major roads.

== Mission ==
The Lagos State Traffic Management Authority has a mission to promote a state-wide culture of traffic regulation, control, and management, as well as to ensure smooth traffic flow on Lagos roads.

== Vision ==
The Lagos State Traffic Management Authority has a vision to reduce deaths and economic losses caused by road traffic accidents and delays on Lagos State's public highways by implementing modern traffic management techniques to bring order and control to the state's roads.
