= Ifako-Ijaiye =

- Local Government Area
- Interactive map of Ifako-Ijaiye
- Coordinates: 06°41′05″N 03°17′20″E
- Country: Nigeria
- State: Lagos
- Headquarter: Ifako
- Created: October 1, 1996

Government
  - Executive Chairman: Prince Usman Akanbi Hamzat
  - House of Representatives Member: Adeyemi Benjamin Olabinjo

Area
  - Total: 43 km^{2} (17 sq mi)

Population (2022)
  - Total: 633,200
  - Density: 15,000/km^{2} (38,000/sq mi)
- Time zone: UTC+1 (WAT)

Ifako-Ijaiye is a local government area in Lagos State and a neighborhood within Metropolitan Lagos, Nigeria. It has a land area of 43 square kilometres (17 sq mi) and had a population of 427,878 people in 2006.

== History ==
The Ifako-Ijaiye Local Government was created along with 183 other local governments on October 1, 1996, by General Sani Abacha, the then military head of state. It was carved out of Agege Local Government, with headquarters in Ifako, and predominantly populated by the Egba Yoruba people.

Ifako-Ijaiye Local Government is a border suburb town as it shares border with Ogun State. The major settlements are Ijaiye, Ifako, Oke-Ira, Iju-Ishaga, Obawole, Iju-Ogundimu, Fagba, Agege Pen Cinema, Ojokoro among others.

== Transport ==
The city is served by Agbado station, located in the Local Council of Agbado-Oke Odo and part of the Lagos Rail Mass Transit project.

== Current Executives ==
Prince Usman Akanbi Hamzat - Executive Chairman

Hon. Mrs. Oluwatoyin Awoniyi Akerele - Vice Chairman

== Photo Gallery ==
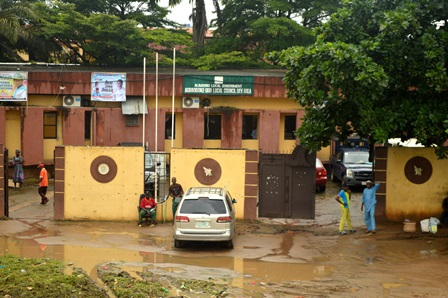
Agbado-Oke-Odo Local Council
