= Area boys =

Organised gangs in Nigerian cities

- Territory: Major cities in Nigeria, including Lagos, Ibadan, Onitsha, Aba, Umuahia, Akure, Ado-Ekiti, and Enugu
- Membership: Street children, teenagers, and youths, mostly males
- Activities: Extortion, illegal drug sale, informal security, other "odd jobs"

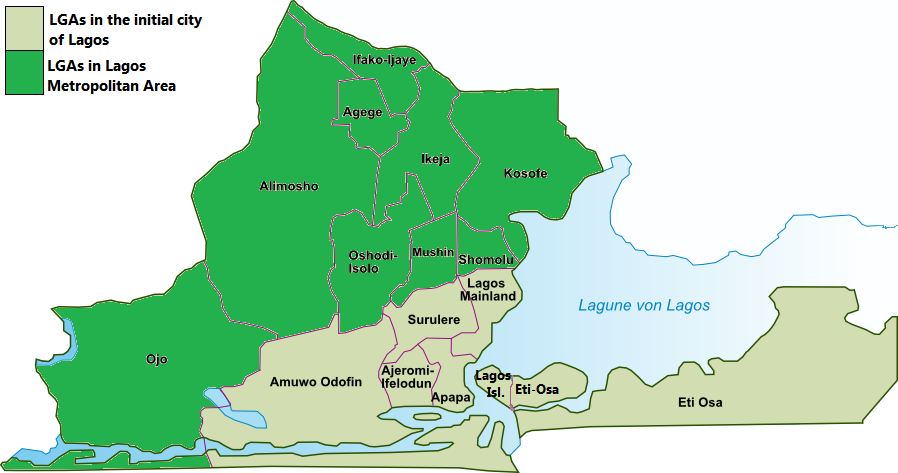
A map of Lagos Metropolitan Area, showing Lagos Island in the south east

Area boys (Yoruba: agba-èrò) are loosely organized gangs of street children, teenagers and youths, composed mostly of males, who operate on the streets of major cities in Nigeria, including Lagos, Ibadan, Onitsha, Aba, Umuahia, Akure, Ado-Ekiti and Enugu. They extort money from passers-by, public transporters and traders, sell illegal drugs, act as informal security guards, and perform other "odd jobs" in return for compensation.

In present times, "Agbero" is used informally to describe a person, usually a thug, who collects rates, fees, tools and other forms of tax around motor parks.

== Colonial history ==
=== Jaguda boys (1920-1940) ===
Jaguda, meaning 'pickpockets', were a group of informally structured young boys based in Lagos and Ibadan whose camaraderie was grounded on age and neighbourhood and whose major form of operation was against property. These boys were usually products of a broken home or have lost a breadwinner and migrated to the city to fend for themselves. Reports of juvenile offenders operating in crowded places began to reach the press in Lagos by the mid-1920s. In Ibadan they were primarily migrant juveniles living in Ekotedo area, their visible means of income is to carry loads of the passengers within railways stations and collecting bus and lorry fares on behalf of drivers. While in Lagos they could be seen gathering in Victoria Street, Ereko market, Jankara market, Iddo railway terminus and outside the tax office. Their underworld activities were conducted through various means, including premeditating chaos in markets or public spaces by pretending to fight each other or bumping into their targets on the road while fellow gang members stealthily picked the pockets of onlookers. In Lagos, these groups also received payments from market women as a form of protection against theft.

=== Boma boys (1940s) ===
The phenomenon of Boma boys in Lagos was ascribed to a group of unlicensed guides of African and Europeans servicemen who operated prominently during World War II. The boys were based around the Marina; some were stowaways on ships who went to Freetown, where the use of the word bum meant to beg. On their return to Lagos they hung around the Marina duping unsuspecting students of their school fees under the pretext they could arrange for them to travel abroad as stowaways. When ships berth in the Marina, the boys show the way to the restaurants, hotels and brothels in Lagos to newly arrived sailors. When prostitution rose in Lagos, Boma boys were linked to its rise as a result of their activities conveying targets to brothels.

=== Thugs and touts ===
The use of the new nomenclature, touts or thugs to describe juvenile undesirables began in the 1950s. These youths who performed visible employment working in motor parks replaced the Boma and Jaguda boys of the 1950s. These groups, made up of known bullies who also work for politicians, are closer to their modern day offspring, the Area boys. Some sources claim that they sometimes receive money from politicians to cause mayhem, destruction of properties and lives.

== Area boys ==
The nomenclature of Area boys can also mean touts, Alaayes, Agberos, omo onile, they are generally considered deviant youths who use extortion, exploitation, petty crimes and sometimes violent means to earn income. These group grew along with the emergence of a growing informal economy of street trading. Many previously worked at the motor parks or as helps to carry loads for market customers. Their activities expanded into acting as security for businessmen and politicians, bouncers, or means to harass tenants, loan defaulters, or the electoral process.

Area boys like their name, are boys known in the neighborhood, unlike their predecessors, Jagudas and Boma boys, Area boys were less likely to be recent migrants. The boys are easily identified in the neighborhood and have a base location for meetings. The base membership straddles employed and unemployed youths. To earn income, the unemployed youths move outwards towards a junction or intersection where they don on outfits as union members of a road transport association or engage in security related commerce that verges on extortion. New contractors are billed owo ile or land levy, market traders are billed owo security which is money for security and there is street money or owo ita which is compensation to the area boys for commerce related activities within the neighborhood.

== Demographics ==
Area boys have existed in the city of Lagos since the early 1980s. However, under various names, types of Area Boys have been traced back to the 1920s. In 2007, the total number of area boys in Lagos was estimated at over 35,000 by a member of the Lagos State Judiciary; as of 1996, the number of them operating on Lagos Island alone was placed around 1,000. A 1996 study of area boys on Lagos Island by Abubakar Momoh showed that only 26.4% of area boys were from Lagos State, while the rest were natives of Ogun State (22.6%), Kwara State (14.2%), and Oyo State (14.1%), amongst other states. Most were between twelve and thirty-five years old.

Asked whether they were "proud" to be area boys, 18% of respondents said yes, while 75% said no (7% did not respond).

== Tactics and targets ==
A United Nations Development Programme (UNDP) 2001 report on Nigeria described the impact of the gang members as such:

The coercive and persuasive requests, petty crimes and sometimes violent offences by the so-called "area boys" to acquire resources, generally cash in the urban main business and crowded areas, have disturbed the civil society and defied the civic authority. Drug abuse among them has been variously reported as the cause of delinquent behaviour and crime.

=== Extortion ===
One of the methods Area Boys use for extortion is to surround pedestrians, drivers, and passengers in vehicles, which are stuck in traffic, and force them to pay for some actual or fictitious service before letting them go. To aid in collecting money during traffic jams, the area boys place nails in the road and dig up the streets. When the streets are flooded, however, they also aid motorists in avoiding ditches and pot holes amidst other services.

According to Momoh, much of the extortion from Igbo merchants by area boys is instigated by Lagos landlords, indigenous inhabitants of the city.

=== Illegal drug sale ===
Among the area boys are both sellers and users of illegal drugs. This drug use has been linked as the cause of further crime. A study states "most of them use drugs (cocaine, heroin, marijuana, etc.) either as occasional users or addicts, or as peddlers." Of 77 respondents to a survey, 12.2% dealt drugs, while 60.3% were addicts themselves. Sale of drugs takes place both in Nigeria and abroad, and sales abroad have earned a small percentage of the sellers significant amounts of money.

Groups of area boys have been known to raid rival, Igbo drug sellers based in Central Lagos.

== Notable incidents involving area boys ==
During the Hausa-Yoruba riots in Lagos in 2000, where thousands of Hausa fled to military barracks and nearly 100 people died, area boys took advantage of the chaos and joined in the mayhem, throwing glass and bottles at shops.

At the Mile 12 Market (also in Lagos), soldiers were reported to work hand in hand with gang members as late as 2004. However, in May 2005, after a Nigerian soldier was assaulted and stabbed by several area boys as he tried to prevent them from taking money from a bus driver, the military began a crackdown against the group. Following this, the group's activity was noted to be in decline.

== Area boys elsewhere in Nigeria ==
- Petty criminals have been labeled as "area boys" in Ibadan, where they control informal markets and are used to advance political causes.
- In Yankari National Park in Bauchi State, baboons have been referred to as "area boys" because of their troublesome behavior.
- They were cited as a nuisance by the Director of Communications at Airtel in August 2012 because they demanded money to load diesel at the company's Base Transceiver Stations.

== See also ==
- Bakassi Boys

General:

- Organized crime in Nigeria
- Crime in Nigeria
