= Ibeju-Lekki =

Coordinates: 6.4167°N 2.8833°E

- LGA
- Interactive map of Ibeju-Lekki
- Country: Nigeria
- State: Lagos State
- Headquarter: Igando-Oloja

Government
  - Chairman: Olowa Abdullahi Sesan (JAJA)

Area
  - Total: 455 km^{2} (176 sq mi)

Population (2006)
  - Total: 117,481
  - Density: 258/km^{2} (669/sq mi)
- Time zone: UTC+1 (WAT)
- Website: https://ibejulekki.lg.gov.ng/about/

Ibeju-Lekki is a local government area of Lagos State, Nigeria. The administrative centre was formerly at Akodo and was later moved to Igando Oloja due to the creation of the Lekki Council Development Area. The name of the Local government was derived from two autonomous communities, Ibeju and Lekki.

The demographics of the area include people from different parts of the country living, working and doing business in the area. Ibeju Lekki has potential for tourism as it is endowed with beautiful ocean front and lagoon views.

The development in the area is rapid and ongoing, some even refer to the area as the new Lagos. The commercial centre of Lagos state seems to be shifting gradually towards the area with much effort being put into developing industries and infrastructure.

Ibeju-Lekki is one of the LGAs for the planned Lekki City. With the actualization of the blueprint, Ibeju Lekki is expected to become a central hub for business, manufacturing, warehousing, and logistics. Forecasts have been made about an increase in commercial activities in the area as a result of these developments which will create thousands of jobs and make the area a major business location in the country.

In Ibeju Lekki, there are on-going and proposed industrial developments such as the Dangote Refinery which is expected to be the world's biggest single-train facility and estimated to cost $9bn. It covers a total area of 2,635 hectares (10.17 sq mi) on the Lekki Free Zone near the Lekki Lagoon, enabling easy shipment of refined petroleum products to international markets. The refinery is expected to double Nigeria's refining capacity, largely to accommodate the pressing demand for fuel and export to foreign markets in and out of Africa. A fertilizer plant is also included in the refinery complex, to fully utilize the raw materials released from the refinery.

Also, there is the Lekki International Airport project which was initiated to lessen the pressure on the Murtala Muhammed Airport (MMIA) in Ikeja. The master plan of the new airport shows that it's designed to cater to wide-body, double-deck, and four-engine aircraft with the capacity for up to 500 seats. For a start, the Airbus A380 is expected to carry two million to five million passengers per annum with future prospects of expansion to cater to the increasing aviation needs of the rapidly developing Lekki area and its environs. There is also the Pan-Atlantic University, Lekki Deep Seaport, Lekki International Golf Course and Eleganza Industries. These are among many other industrial developments at Ibeju-Lekki. Also, tourist attractions and parks include LUFASI nature park which keeps some Internationally endangered species.

== Education ==
Some of the secondary schools In Ibeju-Lekki are:

- Corona School
- Greensprings School
- Caleb British international school
- Community Senior High School, Akodo
- Community Senior High School, Debojo
- Community High School, Orimedu
- Ibeju Senior High School
- Iwerekun Community High School, Lakowe
- Magbon-Alade Grammar School
- Elemoro Community Secondary School

== Gallery ==
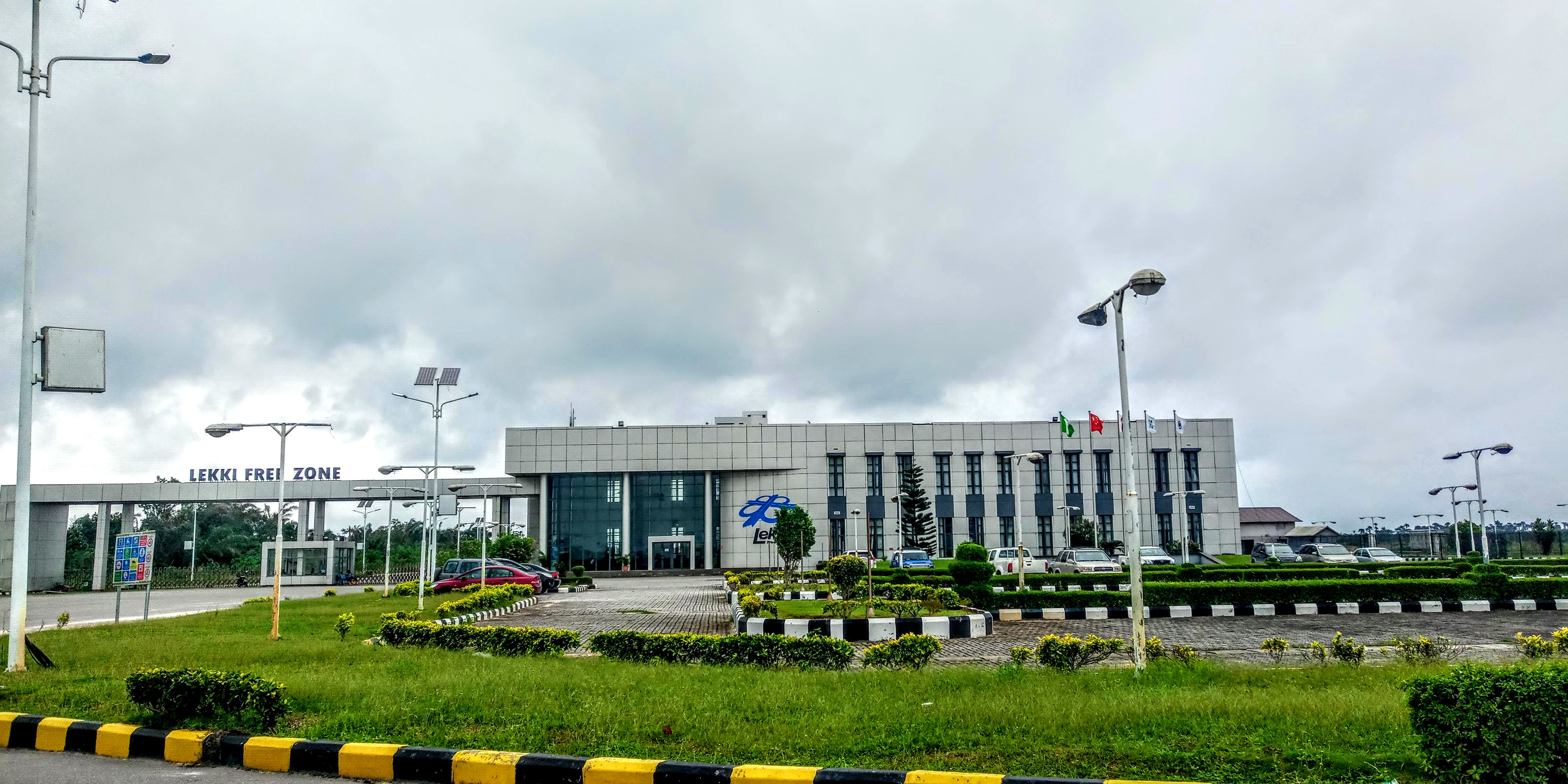
Lekki free trade zone

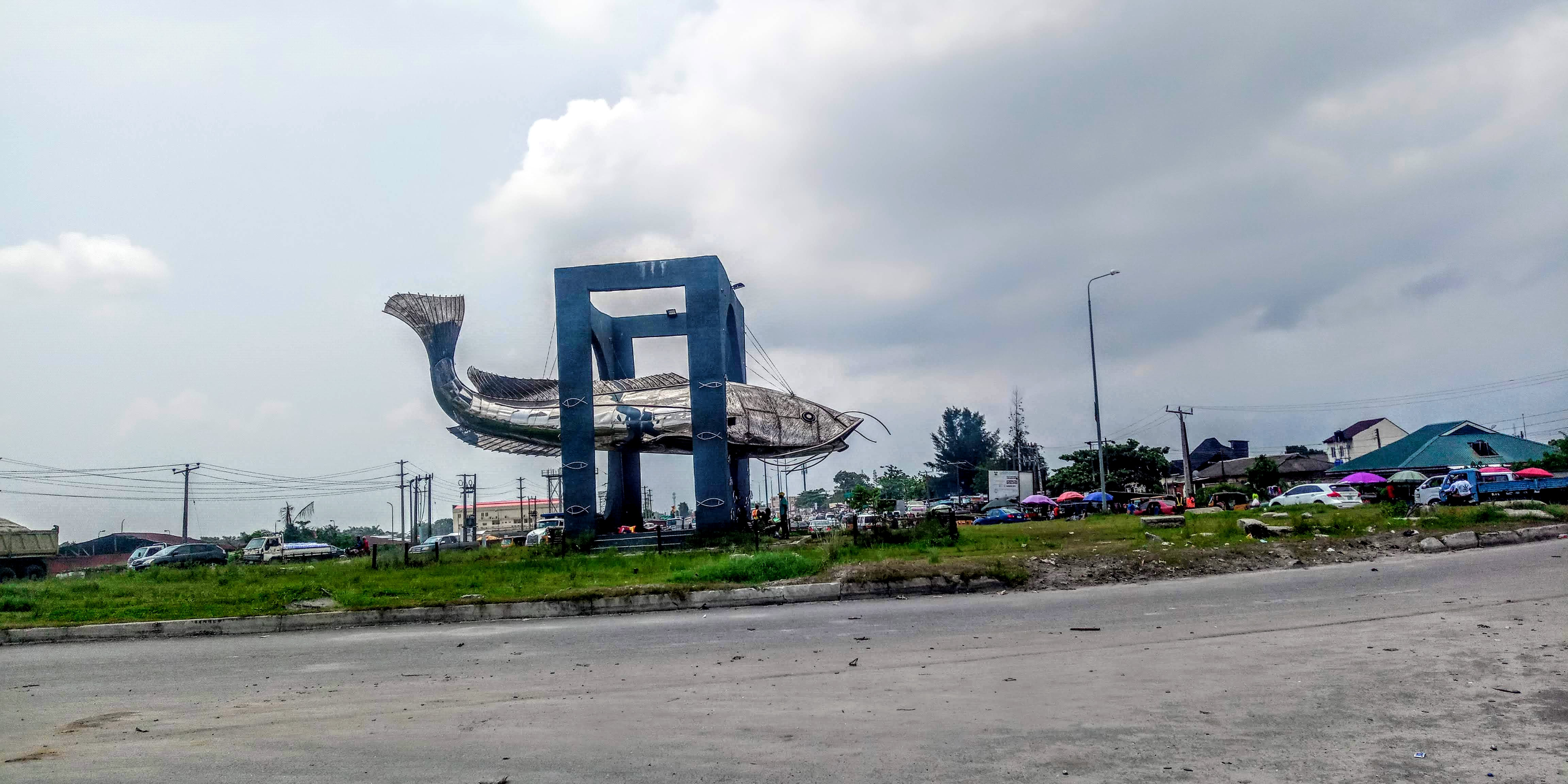
Abraham Adesanya roundabout

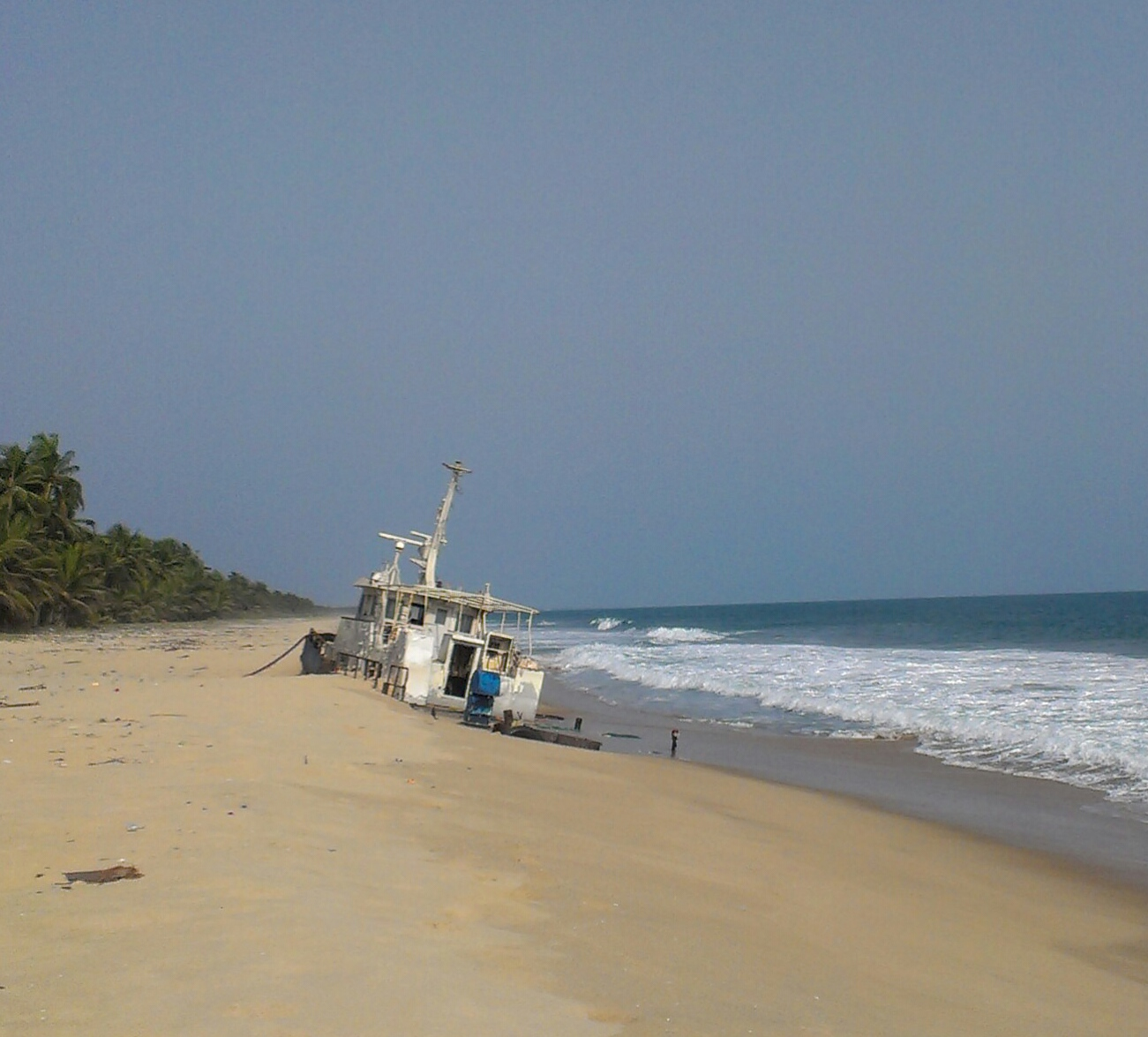
Okun Solu

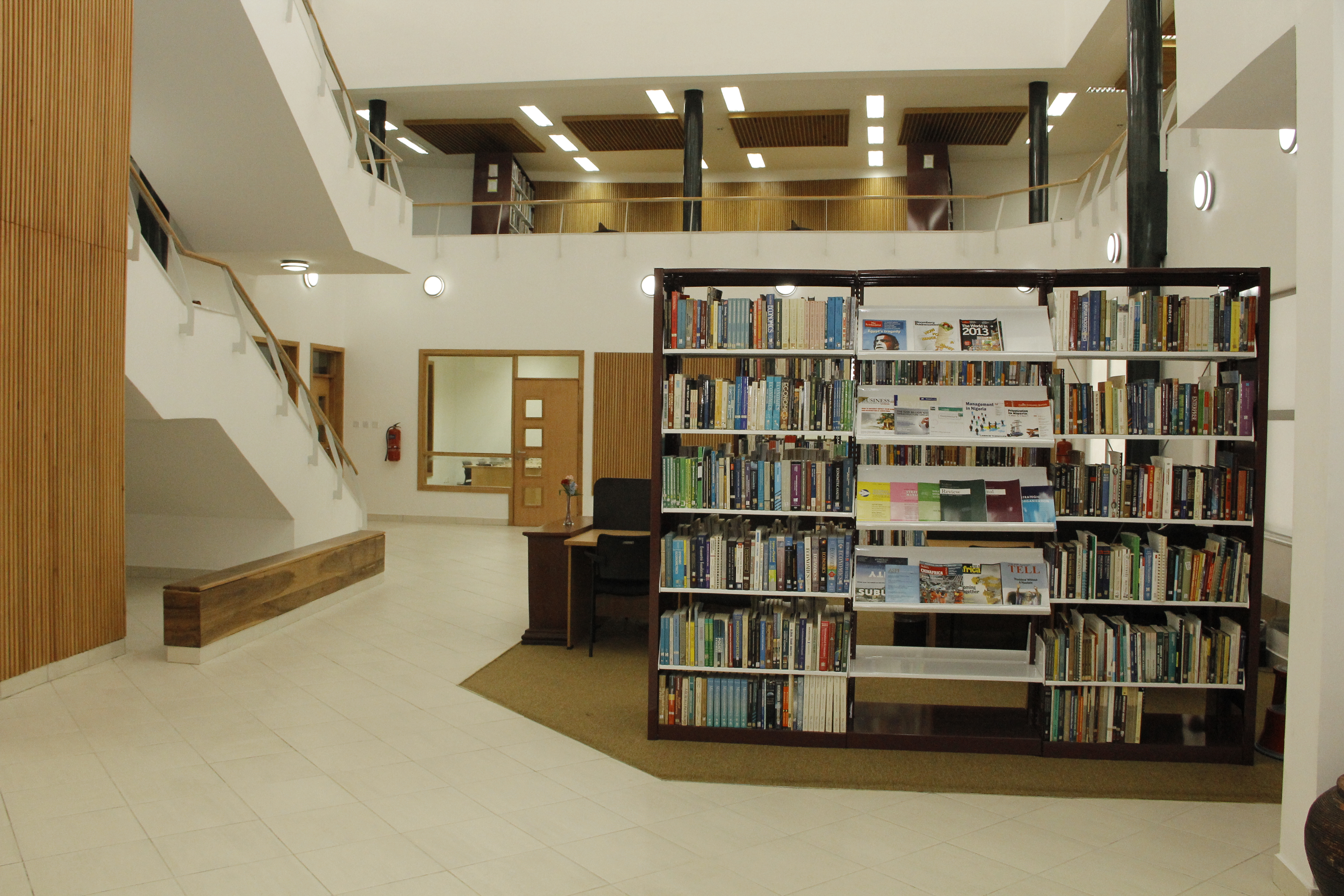
Library of the LBS Pan Atlantic University
