= Index of Lagos-related articles =

The following is an alphabetical list of articles relating to the city of Lagos.

== 0–9 ==
- 4 Bourdillon
- 13th Africa Movie Academy Awards
- 15th Africa Movie Academy Awards
- 16th Africa Movie Academy Awards
- 17th Africa Movie Academy Awards
- 1004 Estate

== A ==
- Abidjan–Lagos Corridor
- Admiralty Circle Plaza
- African Artists' Foundation
- Agege Stadium
- Ajele Cemetery
- Alaba International Market
- Alliance Française de Lagos
- American International School of Lagos
- Anwar ul-Islam Girls High School
- Anyanwu
- Apapa Amusement Park
- Apata Memorial High School
- Architecture of Lagos
- Arthur's Day

== B ==
- Babington Macaulay Junior Seminary
- Balogun Market
- Bogobiri House
- Bookshop House
- Bridge House College
- British International School Lagos

== C ==
- Carter Bridge
- Cathedral Church of Christ, Lagos
- Chicken Republic
- Chrisland Schools
- City Hall, Lagos
- City Mall, Lagos
- Civic Tower (Lagos)
- CMS Grammar School, Lagos
- Committee for Relevant Art
- Computer Village
- Creek Hospital

== D ==
- D-Ivy College
- Dodan Barracks
- Dolphin Estate, Ikoyi
- Dowen College
- Dreamworld Africana

== E ==
- Ebute Ero Market
- Eko Boys' High School
- Eko Bridge
- Eko Hospital
- Eko Hotels and Suites
- Eko Pearl Towers
- Erelu Kuti

== F ==
- Federal Airports Authority of Nigeria
- Federal Government College, Ijanikin
- Federal Medical Centre, Ebute Metta
- Federal Neuro-Psychiatric Hospital, Yaba
- Federal Palace Hotel
- Federal Secretariat
- Festac Town
- First Consultant Hospital
- First Island Montessori School
- First Island School
- Food Logistics Park Lagos
- Fourth Mainland Bridge
- Freedom Park (Lagos)

== G ==
- Galala
- Gbagada General Hospital
- German School Lagos
- GET Arena
- Golden Tulip Festac
- Grace Schools
- Grange School, Ikeja
- Greensprings School

== H ==
- Heritage Place (Lagos)
- Holy Child College
- Holy Cross Cathedral, Lagos

== I ==
- Idumota Market
- Ifako International School
- Iga Idunganran
- Igbobi College
- Ikeja
- Ikeja Bus Terminal
- Ikeja Cantonment
- Ikeja City Mall
- Ikotun Market
- Ikoyi Cemetery
- Ilojo Bar
- Ilubirin Estate
- Imagneto Dance Company
- Independence House
- Indian Language School
- Institute for Industrial Technology
- International School Lagos
- Isolog schools
- Italian International School "Enrico Mattei"

== J ==
- Jaekel House
- Johfrim Art and Design Studio

== K ==
- Kilimanjaro (restaurant)
- King's College, Lagos
- Kings Tower, Lagos
- Kingsfield College
- Kirikiri Maximum Security Prison

== L ==
- Ladipo Market
- Lagoon Hospitals
- Lagoon Secondary School, Lekki
- Lagos
- Lagos Baptist Academy
- Lagos Central Mosque
- Lagos Countdown
- Lagos Fashion Week
- Lagos Island General Hospital
- Lagos Lawn Tennis Club
- Lagos Polo Club
- Lagos Preparatory School
- Lagos State
- Lagos State Governor's House
- Lagos State Ministry of Housing
- Lagos State University Teaching Hospital
- Lagos Terminus railway station
- Lagos Town Council
- Lagos Trade Fair Complex
- Lagos University Teaching Hospital
- Lebanese Community School
- Lekki
- Lekki-Ikoyi Link Bridge
- Lekki British School
- Lekki International Airport
- Lagos-related lists:
  - List of festivals in Lagos
  - List of hospitals in Lagos
  - List of markets in Lagos
  - List of radio stations in Lagos
  - List of restaurants in Lagos
  - List of schools in Lagos
- Longford International School
- Lycée Français Louis Pasteur de Lagos

== M ==
- MacGregor canal
- Mafoluku Bus Terminal
- Makoko Floating School
- Mama Cass (restaurant)
- Methodist Boys' High School
- Mictec Schools
- MKO Abiola Statue
- Mr Bigg's
- Murtala Muhammed International Airport
- Muson Centre

== N ==
- National Gallery of Modern Art, Lagos
- National Orthopaedic Hospital, Igbobi
- National Stadium, Lagos
- National Temple
- National Theatre, Nigeria
- NECOM House
- New Afrika Shrine
- Nestoil Tower
- Nigeria
- Nigeria ICT Fest
- Nigerian National Museum
- Nike Art Gallery

== O ==
- Oba of Lagos
- Omenka Gallery
- Onikan Stadium
- Oshodi Bus Terminal
- Oshodi market
- Oyingbo Bus Terminal
- Oyingbo Market

== P ==
- Palms Shopping Mall
- Parkview Estate, Ikoyi
- Presidential Lodge

== Q ==
- Queen Amina Statue
- Queen's College, Lagos

== R ==
- Randle General Hospital
- Reddington Hospital
- Redeemer's International Secondary School
- Rele Art Gallery
- Remembrance Arcade (Lagos)
- Revolving Art Incubator

== S ==
- Satellite Town, Lagos
- Sheraton Lagos Hotel
- Shitta-Bey Mosque
- Silverbird Galleria
- Soldier Idumota
- St Gregory's College, Lagos
- St. Francis Catholic Secondary School, Nigeria
- St. Nicholas Hospital, Lagos
- State High School
- Statue of Elizabeth II, Lagos

== T ==
- Tafawa Balewa Square
- Tantalizers
- Tastee Fried Chicken
- TBS Bus Terminus
- TEDxLagos
- Tejuosho Market
- Terra Kulture
- Teslim Balogun Stadium
- The Wings Towers
- Third Mainland Bridge
- Timberville (Lagos)
- Timeline of Lagos
- Tinubu Square
- Tourist attractions in Lagos

== U ==
- Union Bank Building (Lagos)

== V ==
- Veggie Victory
- Victoria Garden City
- Vivian Fowler Memorial College for Girls

== W ==
- Water House
- Welcome to Lagos (disambiguation)

== Y ==
- Yaba Bus Terminal
- Yaba Cemetery
- Yellow Chilli Restaurant
