= Transport in Lagos =

Transport in Lagos currently consists of four modes: road, water, rail and air.

== Roads ==
Federal Highways are:

- A1 north from Lagos as part of the Trans-African 8 (TAH 8) Lagos-Mombasa Highway,
- E1 north from Lagos to Oyo State,
- A5 north from Lagos,
- F101 east from Lagos via Agbwa-Epe-Sumage to A121 near Oso in Oyo State,
- the Lagos-Abeokuta Expressway 81 km from Ikeja to Abeokuta, the capital of Ogun State,
- the Lagos-Ibadan Expressway to Oyo State as part of (TAH 2) Trans-African Highway 2, the Trans-Sahara Highway or African Unity Rd,
- the Lekki-Epe Expressway east from Lagos.

One road to the Republic of Benin:

F100 west from Apapa Rd in Lagos as the Lagos-Badagry Expressway (part of The Trans-African 7 (TAH 7) Lagos-Dakar Trans-West African Coastal Highway) for about 60 km along the coast to the border at Akraké.

Other major roads include

- Itokin Rd east from Ikorodu as the Ikorodu-Epe Rd,
- the Iken-Sekungba Rd north from Ketu to Ogun State,
- the Epe-Ijebu-Ode Rd north from Epe to Ogun State.

== Airports ==
Murtala Mohammed International in Ikeja (1978).

== Railways ==
Lagos is connected with Abeokuta by 77 km of the Western Railway (1899) on the 1067 mm (3ˈ6") Cape Gauge, with a new 1435 mm (4ˈ8½") standard gauge line from Lagos to Ibadan opened 2021.

Lagos Rail Mass Transit

Overview
- Owner: Lagos State Managed by Eko Rail under a Concession Agreement
- Locale: Lagos, Nigeria
- Transit type: Rapid Transit

Operation
- Began operation: December 2022 (expected)
- Operator: Lagos Metropolitan Area Transport Authority (LAMATA)
- Number of vehicles: 15 four-car BMU CNR Dalian for Blue Line

Technical
- System length: 35 km (22 mi)
- Track gauge: 1,435 mm (4 ft 8 1/2 in) standard gauge

Lagos Rail Mass Transit is a system being developed and under construction in Lagos, Nigeria. The system (the first modern rail-based public transport in Sub-Saharan Africa outside of South Africa) is being sponsored by the Lagos Metropolitan Area Transport Authority (LAMATA) and is envisioned to consist eventually of seven lines. The railway equipment including electric power, signalling, rolling stock, and fare collection equipment will be provided by the private sector under a Concession Contract. LAMATA is responsible for policy direction, regulation, and infrastructure for the network.

Lagos government inaugurated the Blue and Red Rail Lines to revolutionise the city's transportation.

The concessionaire will generate its own dedicated electricity. The first section of the network (Phase I of the Blue Line) was scheduled to enter revenue service by the first quarter of 2014, but had not yet opened as of September 2014, amid delays.

=== Timeline ===
- 2008: A metro is proposed for Lagos, allegedly with a completion date of 2011.
- 2009: Construction commences on the Blue Line.
- 2010: Lagos Rail Mass Transit to proceed.
- 2016: Phase I (the Blue Line from Marina to Mile 2) planned to open in December 2016.
- 2018: After an Alstom review of the project, Phase I (the Blue Line from Marina to Mile 2) is now set to open in 2021.
- 2021: The Lagos State Government announced that the Blue and Red Lines will open in December 2022.
- 2022, January: LAMATA purchases two Talgo VIII trains.
- 2023, September: The Blue Line starts service, connecting Marina to Mile 2.

=== History ===
The Lagos tramway ran from 1902 to 1933. The passenger line was one of the earliest public transport system built within Lagos, carrying travelers, traders and workers from the train station at Iddo going to Lagos Island.

The idea of developing rapid transit in Lagos dates from the 1980s with the Lagos Metroline network conceived by the Alhaji Lateef Jakande during the Second Nigerian Republic. The initial Metroline project was scrapped in 1985 by Muhammadu Buhari at a loss of over $78 million to the Lagos tax payers. The idea of developing a light rail network for Lagos was revived by Governor Bola Tinubu in the early 2000s with a formal announcement of its construction in December 2003.

This initial $135 million proposal was part of the greater Lagos Urban Transportation Project to be implemented by the newly formed Lagos Metropolitan Area Transport Authority (LAMATA). LAMATA initially concentrated on developing a Bus Rapid Transit system, running from Mile 12 to Lagos Island. In 2008, LAMATA began also to make progress with the rail project, focusing initially on the Blue Line and the Red Line.

=== Rolling stock ===
In September 2011, LAMATA announced that it would acquire some H5-series subway trains formerly used by the Toronto Transit Commission (TTC). The cars are being refurbished in the United States and converted to standard gauge before being imported and put into service on the Blue and Red lines. The same contract also included an option for some H6-series subway cars from the TTC, however this has since been cancelled. The trains were built as two-unit married pairs with a driver's cab in the front right corner of each car.

=== Routes ===
==== Okokomaiko-Marina Blue Line ====
In April 2008, the Lagos State Government approved ₦ 70 billion for construction of the Okokomaiko-Iddo-Marina Line, with an estimated completion date of 2011. Advisory services are being provided by CPCS Transcom, an Infrastructure Development consulting firm based in Ottawa, Canada. Construction actually commenced in January 2010, and completion was initially expected in 2015. However, the Blue Line did not open until September 2023.

The Blue Line was built by China Civil Engineering Construction Corporation. The Blue Line runs 27.5 km from Marina to Okokomaiko, with 13 stations. End-to-end journey time is approximately 35 minutes. It was built as a high capacity, electrically powered rail mass transit system. Most of the route is on the surface, running east-west, in the central reservation of the rebuilt Badagry Expressway between Igbo-Elerin Road (Okokomaiko) and Iganmu.

The line runs on an elevated structure from Iganmu along the south side of the expressway passing the junction with Eric Moore Road, crossing just south of the National Theatre to Iddo, then south to Lagos Island with a terminal at Marina. A Maintenance and Storage Facility (MSF) will be constructed at Okokomaiko, with a track connection from the Blue Line to the depot.

The entire Blue Line operates over a secure and exclusive right-of-way, with no level crossings and no uncontrolled access by pedestrians or vehicles. Lagos State financed construction of the Blue Line from its own resources. A concession contract was awarded to finance, supply and operate the railway equipment, including electric power, signalling, trains, and fare collection.

The Blue Line opened in September 2023, and in its first year of operation moved about 2 million passengers.

==== Agbado-Marina Red Line ====
The second line, the Red Line, will run from Marina to Agbado. The line will share the existing 30 metre wide Nigerian Railway Corporation (NRC) right-of-way.

==== Other lines ====
LAMATA has long term plans to build up to seven lines.

== Bus terminals ==
- Ikeja Bus Terminal, Ikeja
- Mafoluku Bus Terminal, Ikeja
- Oshodi Bus Terminal, Oshodi
- Oyingbo Bus Terminal, Lagos Mainland
- Yaba Bus Terminal, Lagos Mainland
- TBS Bus Terminus, Lagos Island

== See also ==
- Transportation in Nigeria
- LAMATA
- Rapid transit
