= List of hotels in Nigeria =

The following is a list of notable hotels in Nigeria.

== Hotels in Nigeria ==
Hotel	Image	Location	Date established	Notes	References
Eko Hotels and Suites		Lagos State		5 star hotel; hosts AMAA, AMVCA and The Headies awards ceremonies	
Federal Palace Hotel		Lagos State		location of Nigerian Independence declaration	
Four Points by Sheraton		Lekki, Lagos State			
Golden Tulip Hotel		Lagos State			
Ibis Hotel		Lagos State			
Jubilee Chalets		Lagos State	2017		
Landmark Hotel		Port Harcourt			
Parkview Astoria Hotel		Lagos State			
Premier Hotel		Ibadan			
Sheraton Lagos Hotel		Ikeja, Lagos State			
Tinapa Lakeside Hotel		Calabar			
Transcorp Hilton hotel		Abuja			
Ibom Hotels and Golf Resort		Akwa Ibom State	2007		

=== Unsorted ===
- Bogobiri House
- Dolphin Estate – a gated community in Ikoyi, Lagos that also hosts several hotels like Oakwood Park Hotel, Casa Hawa-Safe Court, Le Paris Continental Hotel and Pelican

== See also ==
- Tourism in Nigeria
- Lists of hotels – hotel list articles on Wikipedia
