= Timberville (Lagos) =

Village in Lagos, Nigeria

Timberville is a newly built village at the gates of the Nigerian metropolis of Lagos. It is clustered around the new Lagos Sawmill. Lagos' extensive timber industry will move from the city centre to the new location in December 2022.

== Oko Baba, the old location ==
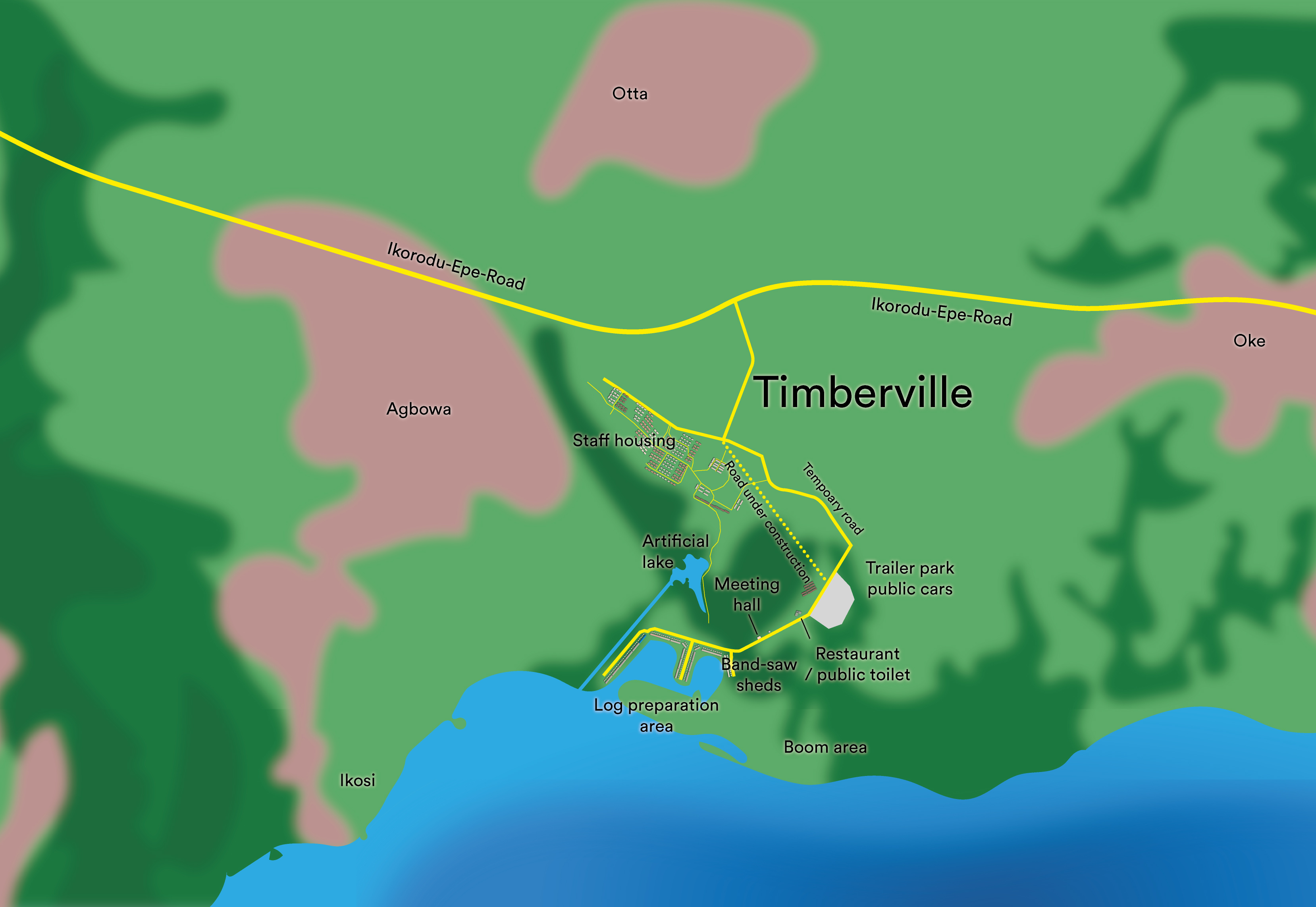
Map of Timberville

Already in colonial times, Nigeria was an important timber exporter, especially of redwood and mahogany. The material was shipped from the outskirts of the port city of Lagos, in the suburb of Oko Baba. With the rapid growth of Lagos, however, the peripheral location became central and the timber industry increasingly became a hindrance to daily life in the big city. Moreover, fires broke out regularly in Oko Baba, posing a threat to the entire city.

Moreover, Oko Baba merges into the drifting slum Makoko, which can only be called the "Venice of Africa" with a lot of good will and which, for example, largely eludes police measures.

In addition to the social component, another problem is the environmental pollution caused by large amounts of released sawdust, which turns to rot where it lands on the water surface. For the above reasons, many state governments in Lagos State were already planning to relocate the "Timber City" to a more favourable location. This was realised under the neoliberal administration of Governor Babatunde Raji Fashola near the fishing village of Ikosi and was quickly named "Timberville".

== The new location ==
Timberville, like other ongoing major projects in Lagos State (Imota rice mill, Food Logistics Hub), is located on the border with Ogun State between Ikorodu and Epe with a connection to the Expressway there.

Apart from the sawmill with a band saw hall, Timberville includes a loading area (boom area), log preparation area, sales offices, trailer park, meeting hall, restaurant, police station, fire station, 160 2-bedroom terraced houses for employees, running water supply and public toilets. Vacated sawdust is pressed into pallets in a dedicated briquette plant to be sold to industry as heating fuel. It has a capacity of 1,500 tonnes per hour.

There were delays in creating the access road, whose main bridge proved unexpectedly difficult to construct. This was solved by creating a temporary makeshift road.
