= Lagos State Development and Property Corporation =

Lagos State Development and Property Corporation is a state government owned corporate entity that builds, rents and sells houses to low, medium and high income families in Lagos. Some of the structures developed by the company include: Dolphin Estate, Falomo Shopping Complex and multi family apartments in Iba, Isolo, Abesan and Amuwo Odofin.

== History ==
=== LEDB ===
Between the years 1924 and 1930, an outbreak of bubonic plague occurred in colonial Lagos and as a measure to clear swamps and provide housing facilities with better sanitary conditions, colonial authorities inaugurated the Lagos Executive Development Board.The first Nigeria Secretary to LEDB is Olayinka Kingpaul In addition, to swamp clearance, the board's responsibilities included land use mapping and monitoring insanitary buildings. Some of the early activities of the organization included swamp reclamation projects through pumping sand; activities that later led to the Iganmu Industrial Estate and the Victoria Island Reclamation Scheme. However, the swamp clearing and insanitary structures monitoring generated its share of criticism, in 1930, Eleko Sanusi Olusi lamented that the exercise left many people homeless.

Over the years, the board built and sold houses and plots of land to civil servants, investors and Lagos residents. Some early housing projects were the Yaba estate started in 1929 and the Lagos Central Slum Clearance Planning Scheme started in 1951. In the 1950s, a rise in rural urban migration motivated LEDB to become more invested in providing infrastructure for Lagos residents and also intensification of slum clearance. The corporation developed housing schemes in Apapa (1953), and a new estate in Surulere to relocate residents affected by its slum clearance projects on Lagos Island. From 1955 to 1972, the board built 4,500 houses.

The slum clearance activities that began in 1955 affected a congested triangular region of Lagos Island bordered by Broad St, Balogun St, and Victoria St (Nnamdi Azikiwe st). The motive of the clearance was to provide an healthier environment but was also seen as an exercise promoted by Nigerian political elites who were not comfortable with the existence of slums in the nation's capital as independence was looming. The plan was to acquire the residences, redevelop the land and sell it back to the original owners with a caveat that the new buildings should be modernized. Some property owners and residents affected were asked to move to Surulere where a Western model storey building accommodating a nuclear family other than an extended family was planned. However, many of the original residents could not afford to buy back the plots of land.

=== Ikeja and Epe planning authorities ===
In 1956, the government of the Western region established Ikeja Area Planning Authority (IAPA). The agency was responsible for land use planning and government supported housing in Ikeja, Mushin, Isolo, Agege and a few other suburbs of Lagos. Another agency, Epe Town Planning (ETPA) managed land use outside metropolitan Lagos.

=== LSDPC ===
In 1972, LEDB, IAPA and ETPA was transformed to become the Lagos State Development and Property Corporation. Town planning functions was moved to a state ministry and the new agency's responsibilities were housing provision related. Between 1972 and 1975, the firm completed estates in Surulere and Ogba. Under the administration of Lateef Jakande, the corporation focused on building low cost apartments. By 1992, the company had built more than 17,000 units in Ojokoro, Isolo, Amuwo Odofin, Ijaye and Iba. A lot of these projects, especially the low cost estates are allocated without a clear criteria for choosing buyers, as a result many of the owners are investors who later rent out the buildings to tenants at high prices. In 1999, the new democratic government through LSDPC started new estates tagged Millennium Housing Scheme.

== Selected LSDPC projects ==
- Amuwo Odofin New Town. Sand filled project to develop land for approximately 100,000 people.
- Dolphin Estate
- Victoria Island Scheme. Apartment complex
- Gbagada Estate
- Omole settlement
- Ogba residential and industrial estate
- Alaka and Animashaun extension, Surulere
- Bode Thomas St flats
