= Kingfield (disambiguation) =

Kingfield or King Field may refer to the following places:

- Kingfield, Maine, a New England town
  - Kingfield (CDP), Maine, the main village in the town
- King Field, Minneapolis, Minnesota, a neighborhood
- Kingfield, an area of Woking, Surrey, England
  - Kingfield Stadium, Woking

== See also ==
- Kingfield and Dead River Railway, Maine
- Kingsfield (disambiguation)
- King's Field
