= David MacKenzie =

David MacKenzie or Mackenzie may refer to:

- David Neil MacKenzie (1926–2001), British linguist and Iranist
- Dave MacKenzie (politician) (born 1946), Canadian politician
- David Mackenzie (director) (born 1966), Scottish director
- David MacKenzie (rugby union) (1921–2005), Scottish international rugby union player
- David Mackenzie (trade unionist) (1922–1989), Scottish trade union leader
- D. J. M. Mackenzie (1905–1994), British colonial medical official
- David D. Mackenzie (1860–1926), first Dean of Detroit Junior College
- David MacKenzie (researcher) (born 1949), Australian social researcher
- Dave MacKenzie (soccer) (born 1956), retired Scottish-Canadian soccer defender

== See also ==
- David McKenzie (disambiguation)
