= Mafoluku Bus Terminal =

Mafoluku Bus Terminal is located in the vicinity of the Murtala Muhammed International Airport, Ikeja. The Mafoluku Terminal provides a means of connection to the Murtala Muhammed International Airport (MMIA) and the domestic wing of the airport, the terminal is also a gateway station that would serve Mafoluku, Oshodi, and Ajao Estate environs, providing bus connections primarily to Oshodi Transport Interchange, Ikeja Bus Terminal, Mile 2 and other parts of Lagos, Nigeria.

== Operation ==
Governor Babajide Sanwo-Olu said both LAMATA and FAAN would be operating transportation franchises in and out of the Mafoluku terminal. While LAMATA will operate passenger bus services to Mile 2 and Oshodi, FAAN will run the local and international airports passenger services.

The Mafoluku Bus Terminal is one of the four bus terminus the Lagos State Government embarked upon in 2017 with the objective of providing quality bus infrastructure that will support government's bus reform initiative. The bus termini projects are geared towards the provision of safe and quality public transport infrastructure that is comfortable and reliable.

== Construction ==
The Mafoluku Bus Terminal was built by the Lagos Metropolitan Area Transport Authority (LAMATA) in collaboration with the Federal Airports Authority of Nigeria (FAAN), operators of the airport. The bus terminal was built on a land of 7,952 square meters, which was provided by FAAN. The edifice has a tarmac that can accommodate 27 high occupancy vehicles and drop off zone.

== Facilities ==
The terminal has facilities, including ticketing and sitting area, control room, cafeteria, public conveniences, commercial areas staff offices, ATM gallery and IT department. The terminal also has repair workshop area where buses would be maintained, in addition to fire equipment and traffic safety equipment.

== Commissioning ==
The Mafoluku Bus Terminal was commissioned by the Governor of Lagos State, Babajide Sanwo-Olu on 26 May 2021, also present for the commissioning was managing director of LAMATA, Mrs. Abimbola Akinajo and managing director of FAAN, Captain Rabiu Yadudu, represented by Director of Finance, Mrs. Nike Aboderin.
