= Oyingbo Bus Terminal =

Bus terminal in Nigeria

Oyingbo Bus Terminal is located in Oyingbo Rd, Lagos Mainland, Lagos State, Nigeria. The Terminus is built at the centre of Oyingbo area and it shares boundaries with Yaba, Iddo and Ijora/Costain axis. Oyingbo Bus Terminal is the sister terminal to both the Oshodi and Ikeja Bus Terminals. The buses are fully air-conditioned and very convenient. The bus terminal is located at the heart of the busy Oyingbo market. Ease of accessing the island and other Mainland areas of Lagos by Bus is an advantage of the location of this bus terminal.

== Construction ==
The Oyingbo Bus Terminal construction was initiated by Governor Akinwunmi Ambode-led administration in 2017 as part of the Bus Reform Initiative of the Lagos State Government, will be the biggest terminal in the State capable of serving 4 million residents. In 2017 Lagos State Government released the prototype design of the Oyingbo BRT Bus Terminus to the public, according to the prototype, the terminus will be able to contain at least 50-60 BRT Buses at a stretch.

Midi buses (40-Passenger Medium) was deployed at the bus terminal by the Lagos Metropolitan Area Transport Authority, LAMATA and Lagos Bus Services Limited, LBSL, in line with the project on the gradual re-fleeting of the 14-18 seater yellow mini bus with a 40-Passenger Medium and 80-passenger High Capacity buses to reduce the number of buses plying the State's roads, improve ecology of the State through reduction in carbon emission, improve the travel time and activate Private Public Partnership (PPP). This will likewise encourage many more people to leave their cars at home and use the buses thereby reducing traffic congestion. The LBSL buses are a set of high-capacity buses that operate in Lagos metropolis. The buses are operated by the Lagos Bus Services Limited (LBSL). The Lagos Bus Services Limited (LBSL) is a company that was set up by the Akinwumi Ambode administration. The company was incorporated on 1 August 2016 as a transport asset acquisition, operations, and advisory services company.

== Incidents ==
During the 2020 #ENDSARS protest, arsonists set a fire at the new Oyingbo Bus Rapid Transport (BRT) terminus in Lagos, destroying hundreds of new BRT buses. It was reported that a large number of new BRT buses yet to be deployed to routes but parked in the terminus situated behind railway line in Oyingbo, have all been consumed by the raging fire.

== Facilities ==
Facilities installed at the Terminal includes a major hub for transport and commerce include ticketing boot, relaxation spot, an eatery, free wifi, modern restrooms, among others.

== Commissioning ==
The Lagos state government under the administration of Governor Babajide Sanwo-Olu has recently announced that it will soon commission the BRT terminus in Oyingbo for public use.
