= David MacKenzie (researcher) =

Australian social researcher

- Born: 27 March 1949 (age 76); Sydney
- Occupation: Social researcher
- Years active: 1988-till date
- Spouse: Voula MacKenzie (m. 1984)
- Children: 5

David MacKenzie (born 27 March 1949) is an Australian Academic researcher. He is known for his research and development in policy contributions to homelessness, with a particular interest in young people. He is the founder of Youth Development Australia Limited, an NGO.

== Early life and education ==
MacKenzie was born in Sydney to John Franklin MacKenzie and Shirley June Mackenzie. He attended a State High School and with scholarships studied Chemical Engineering at Sydney University. He later completed Post graduate degrees in Education and Social science and after moving to Melbourne in 1975.
