= Lagos tramway =

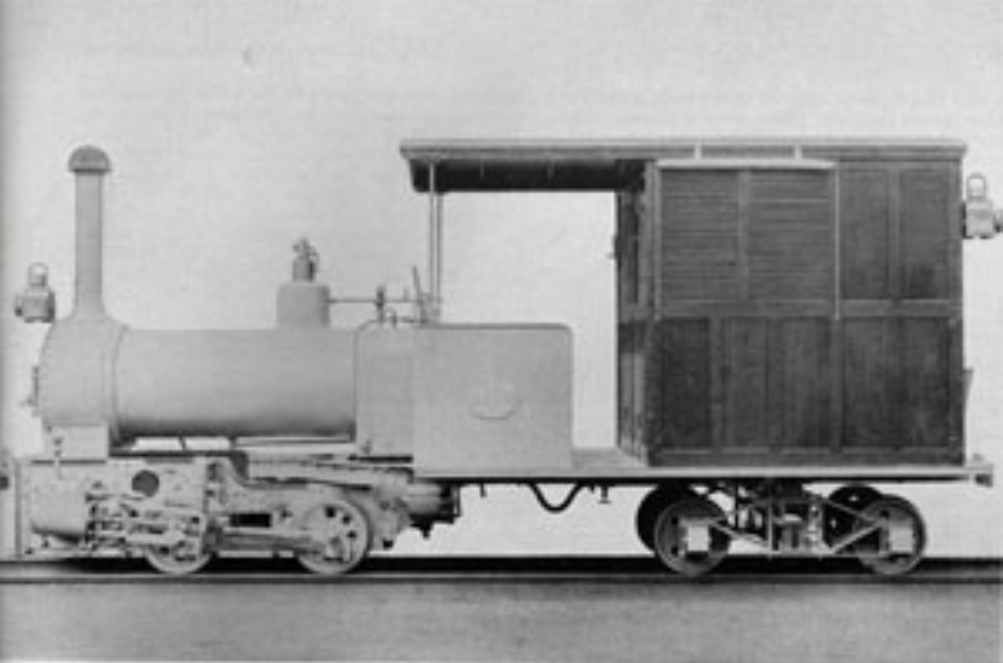
Articulated steam locomotive No 101 of Lagos Government Railway built by Hunslet Engine Company in 1901. It was one of three locomotives of the first batch with LGR Nos 101-103 and works Nos 751-753, the wheel covers have been removed or not yet been installed, when the photo was taken.

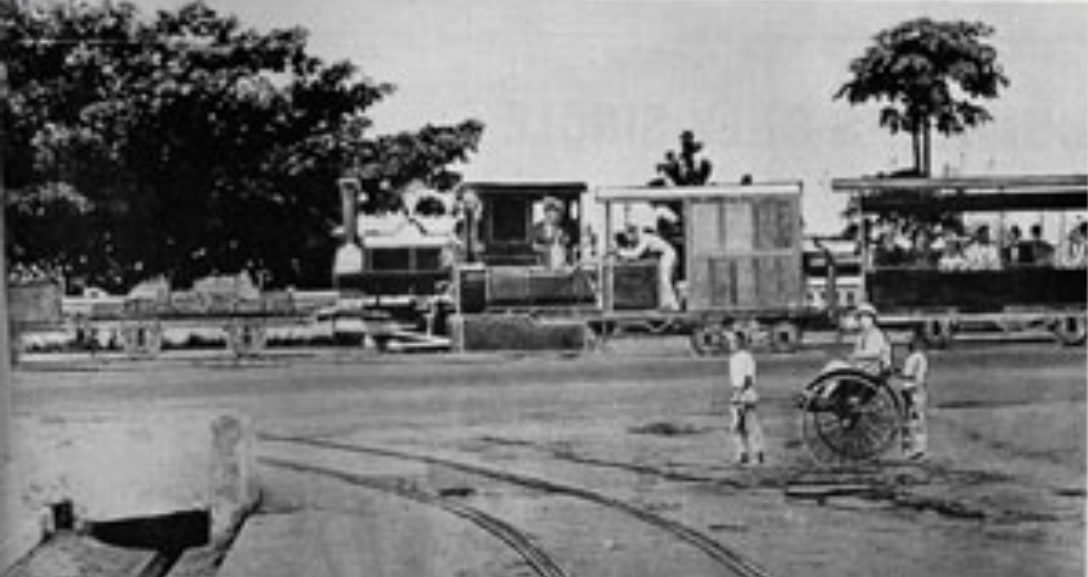
Freight train hauled by a conventional WG Bagnall steam locomotive behind a passenger train hauled by an articulated steam locomotive built by Hunslet Engine Company in a passing loop of the Public Works Department depot the Lagos Government Railway around 1912.

Lagos steam tramway was a passenger and sanitary tramway that carried cargo and passengers within Lagos Colony. The tram was an important public transit system connecting travelers and merchandise from Ibadan and Abeokuta via the railway terminus at Iddo, mainland Lagos to Port of Lagos. The system ran from 1902 to 1933, it carried passengers and goods for twelve years from 1902 to 1914 and nightsoil from 1906 to 1933.

== Steam tramway ==
=== Passenger and goods line ===
Between 1901 and 1902, public sanitation and mosquito eradication palliatives resulted in the construction of an iron bridge over Five Cowrie Creek and swamp land reclamation projects at Kokomaiko. When the colonial government completed the Lagos to Ibadan rail track, the terminal on the Lagos side ended on Lagos mainland and a system had to be devised to link Iddo with the Port of Lagos and other areas on the Island. In 1901, construction commenced of a single track over Carter Bridge. The tram was open to the public in 1902, the passenger cars ran northwards from Kokomaiko in the Marina side of Lagos passing customs wharf then turning left into Balogun Street to Iddo train terminus via Ereko, Ebute Ero, Idumota and Carter Bridge. The passenger line was one of the earliest public transport system built within Lagos, it carried travelers, traders and workers from the train station at Iddo going to Lagos Island.

The line was a single track tramway with a 2 ft 6 in gauge and 7 passing loops on the track. There was a run-in at Iddo terminus with sidings to the goods warehouse. The journey from Marina through Carter bridge was 2 miles 58 chains (4.4 km) with an average speed of 7 3/4 miles per hour (12.5 km/h).

=== Sanitary line ===
In 1906, the sanitary tramway, also called Kokomaiko began operations, it ran from Agarawu through Massey Street and Cow Lane via George V road, Onikan crossing over Five Cowrie Bridge to end at Dejection Jetty. The tram carried nightsoil.

== Rolling stock ==
=== Locomotives ===
The steam tram Lagos had five 0-4-4 locomotives Nos. 101 to 105, which were manufactured by Hunslet Engine Company in Leeds, England. The locomotives No. 101-103 were built in 1910 with the factory numbers 751-753, and No. 104-105 were built in 1910 with the factory numbers 1016-1017. They had outside cylinders with a bore x stroke of 6¼ inches x 8 inches (159 x 203 mm) and a wheel diameter of 1 foot 6½ in (470 mm).

The sanitary tramway had two 0-4-0 saddle tank locomotives from WG Bagnall of Stafford. They had outside cylinders of 7 inches by 12 inches (178 x 305 mm) and a wheel diameter of 1 foot 9½ inches (521 mm). The locomotive 1906 built locomotive with the factory number 1779 was called Kokomaiko, which describes the sound of the locomotive. The other locomotive was built in 1911 with the factory number 1944. It had no name tag but was colloquially called New Sanitary.

=== Carriages and wagons ===
The cars were built by Ashbury Railway Carriage & Iron Company and consisted of 10 passenger trailer units and 20 goods units.

== See also ==
- Transportation in Lagos
- Lagos Rail Mass Transit
