= Kingsfield =

Kingsfield may refer to:

== Characters ==
- Professor Charles Kingsfield, a fictional character in the John Jay Osborn, Jr. 1970 novel, The Paper Chase, as well as the film version

== Places ==
- Kingsfield, Herefordshire, England
- Kingsfield, Maine, USA

== Other uses ==
- Kingsfield College, a Nigerian high school and junior high school
- Kingsfield University, an unaccredited consortium of diploma mills
