= Veggie Victory =

- Interactive map of Veggie Victory

Restaurant information
- Established: 2013
- Owner: Hakeem Jimo
- Food type: Vegetarian cuisine
- Location: Dolphin Estate, Ikoyi Lagos, Lagos, Nigeria
- Coordinates: 6.4566°N 3.4186°E
- Website: veggievictory.com

Veggie Victory is the first vegetarian restaurant in Nigeria.

== History ==
Veggie Victory was established by Hakeem Jimo in 2013. It was first located at Freedom Park, Lagos Island, and is now at Dolphin Estate in Ikoyi, Lagos. VeggieVictory serves strictly Vegan Nigerian and Vegan International cuisine: including fresh, hot, spicy local and West African delicacies. VeggieVictory uses meat substitutes like VegChunks (seitan), tofu and mushrooms for their Veggie burgers, soy dogs, egusi and eforiro stews.

== See also ==
- List of vegetarian and vegan restaurants
- List of restaurants in Lagos
