= Mama Cass (restaurant) =

Restaurant chain based in Nigeria

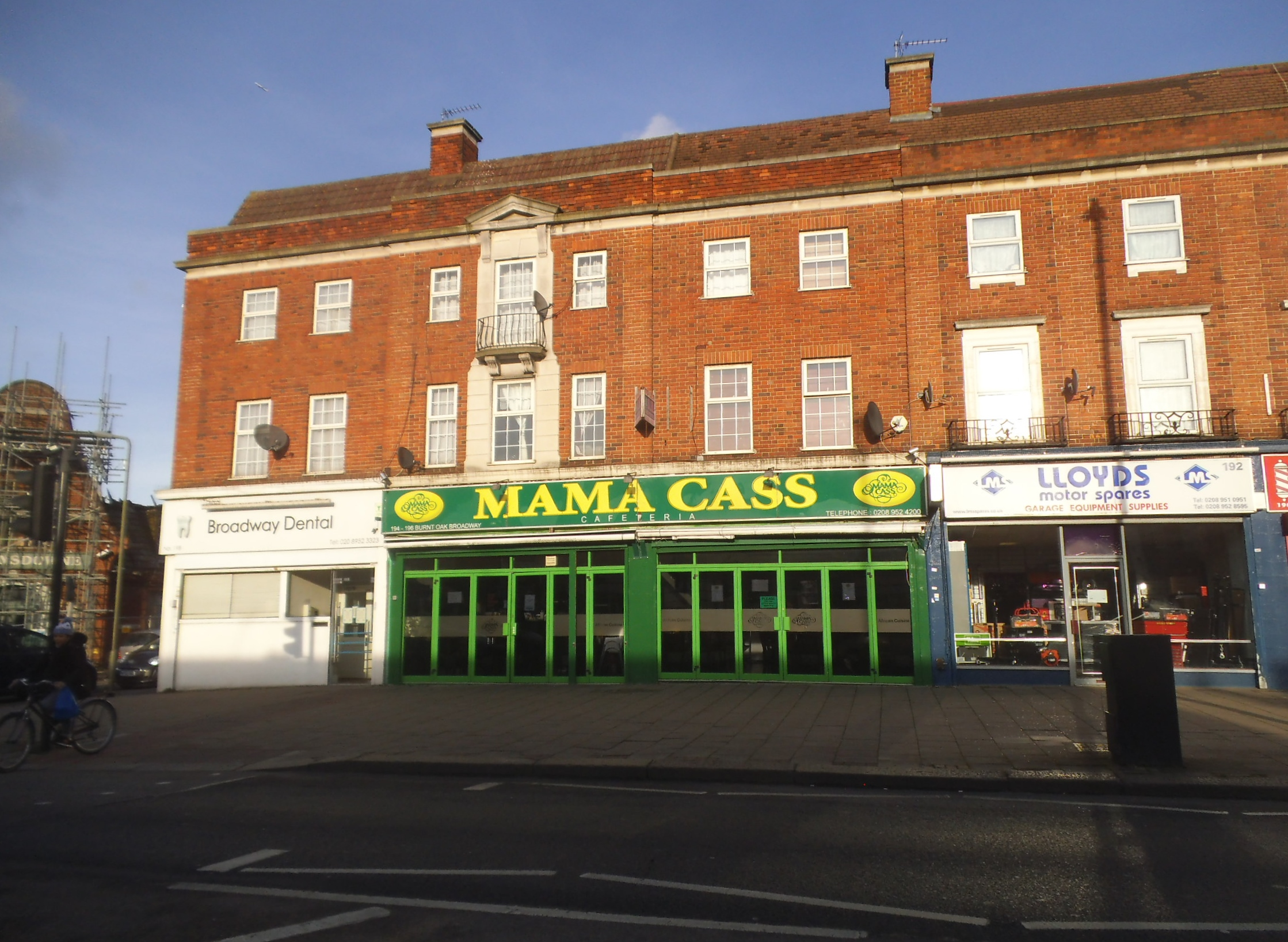
- London Borough of Harrow location
- Interactive map of Mama Cass

Restaurant information
- Established: 1983
- Owner: Charis Grace Onabowale
- Food type: African cuisine, Pastries,
- Location: 4a, Oyeleke Street, Off Kudirat Abiola Way, Alausa Bus Stop, Oregun, Ikeja, Lagos State, Nigeria; United Kingdom
- Website: mamacassuk.com/home/

Mama Cass Restaurants is a food-service-based company in Nigeria.

== History ==
In November 1983, Charis Grace Onabowale opened the first location at Allen Avenue, Ikeja, Lagos State. The first outlet carried for the first time the brand “Mama Cass Cafeteria”. Mama Cass Restaurants currently owns a chain of about 14 quick service restaurants and has expanded its service locations to other parts of the country. Besides Lagos, other outlets are located in other Nigerian states including Ogun, Edo, FCT, and also in the United Kingdom. Mama Cass specializes in traditional African meals, international cuisines and other items like oven-fresh pastries, and Jaydens Sliced Bread. In addition to the restaurant chain, Mama Cass operates a bakery and industrial catering. It has expanded into industrial canteen management, private function catering, and high-volume bread production.

== See also ==
- List of restaurants in Lagos
