= David McKenzie =

David or Dave McKenzie may refer to:

== Politicians ==
- David McKenzie (Canadian politician), member of the Canadian House of Commons
- David McKenzie (South Australian politician) (1842–1919), member of the South Australian House of Assembly
- David McKenzie (Victorian politician) (born 1933), member of the Australian House of Representatives

== Sportspeople ==
- David McKenzie (cyclist) (born 1974), Australian cyclist
- David McKenzie (fencer) (1936–1981), Australian fencer
- David McKenzie (footballer) (born 1942), Australian footballer
- David McKenzie (golfer) (born 1967), Australian golfer
- David McKenzie (sprinter) (born 1970), British track and field athlete
- Dave McKenzie (hammer thrower) (born 1949), American hammer thrower, see 1983 World Championships in Athletics – Men's hammer throw
- Dave McKenzie (runner) (born 1943), New Zealand marathon runner
- Dave McKenzie (soccer) (fl. 1925), Canadian soccer player, see list of Canada men's international soccer players

== Others ==
- Dave McKenzie (artist) (born 1977), American artist
- David McKenzie (economist), lead economist at the World Bank's Development Research Group, Finance and Private Sector Development Unit

== See also ==
- David MacKenzie (disambiguation)
