= Dreamworld Africana =

Theme park in Lekki, Nigeria

Dreamworld Africana Amusement & Theme Park.
- Interactive map of Dreamworld Africana Amusement & Theme Park.
- Location: nigeria Lagos, Lagos State, Nigeria
- Coordinates: 6.4589849°N 3.6015207°E
- Opened: 2013
- Slogan: "The excitement never ends!"
- Operating season: Year-round
- Area: 4.05 ha (10.0 acres)
- Website: dreamworldafricana.com

Dreamworld Africana is an amusement and theme park situated in Lekki, Lagos State.

Established in 2013, Dreamworld covers an area of 4.05 ha (10.0 acres) and re-opened to the public in 2018. The park is one of the main amusement parks in the city. The park provides many attractions to keep its visitors excited. The attractions include wet and dry facilities, bumper cars, carousal, roller coaster, trains, merry go-rounds, toddler play areas and many others.

The park was initiated by private sector investors in the 2010s based on economic development funding from Lagos State Government. There are plans to expand the parks entertainment facilities and attractions.
