= First Island School =

Location
- First Island Close, Peaceland Estate, (through Princess Moji Oriola crescent), Opposite Mayfair Gardens Victoria Court, Lekki-Epe Expressway; Lekki, Lagos; Nigeria

Information
- School type: International - British Curriculum
- Motto: Skills for life
- Head of school: Hon. Peace Ideozu B.Ed, M.Sc
- Gender: Mixed
- Houses: 3
- Colors: Blue, Green & Yellow
- Website: First Island School - Official Website

First Island School (Government Approved) also known as First Island was established in 2007 alongside M M & M International School. M M & M is a nursery and primary school in Ahoada as well as an all girls boarding secondary school in Trans Amadi Gardens, Port Harcourt. The expansion to Lagos changed its name to First Island. They are all run by the multinational education company M M & M Educational Firm as branches to provide international standard education throughout Nigeria.

First Island Lagos is co-educational for children aged from 3 months to 11 years. Its current head of school is Hon. Peace Ideozu B.Ed, M.Sc.

== See also ==
- Schools in Nigeria
