= Lagos Polo Club =

Event venue in Ikoui, Lagos, Nigeria

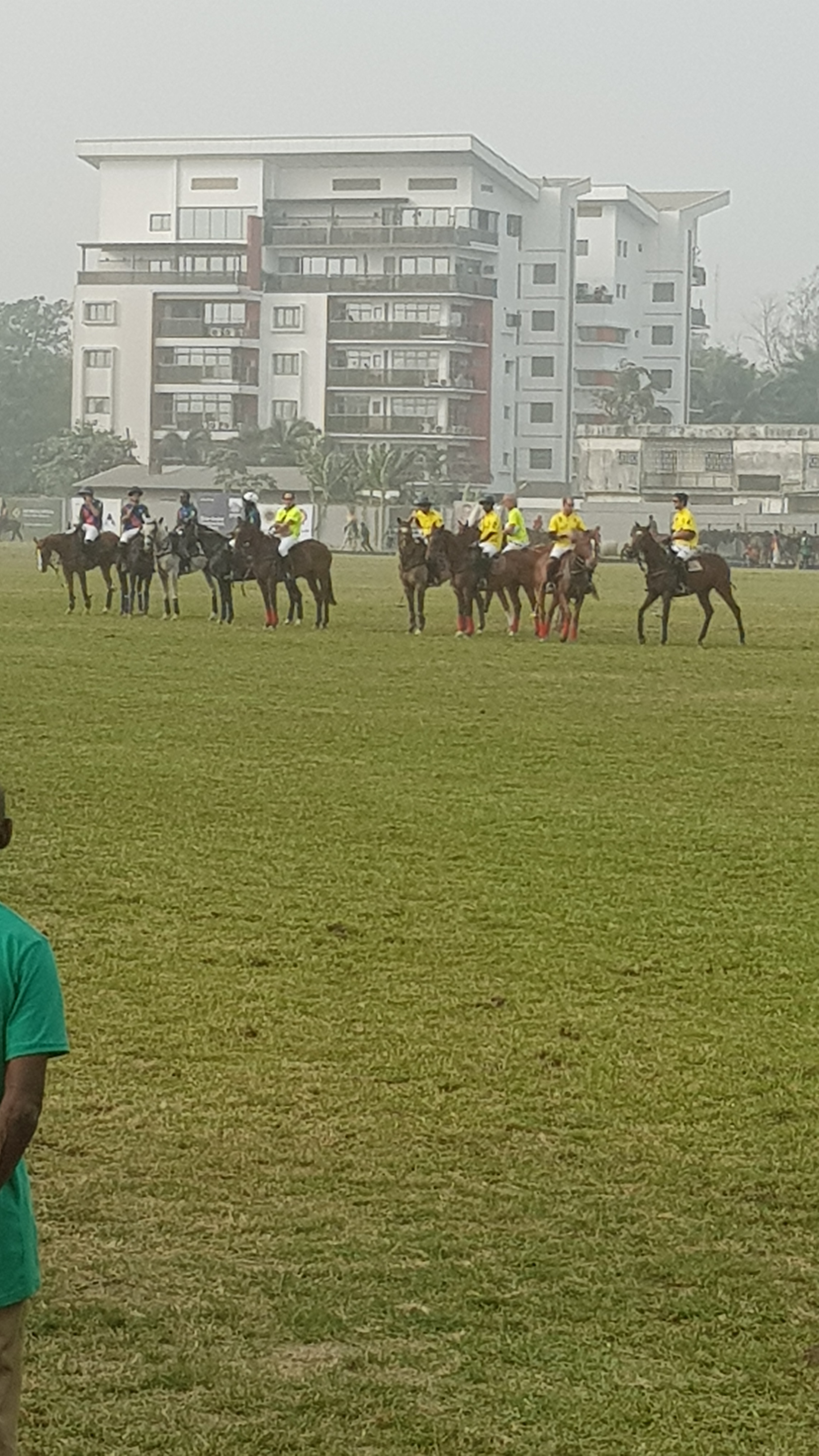
- Interactive map of Lagos Polo Club
- Full name: Lagos Polo Club
- Address: 1 Polo Rd, Off Ribadu Road. S. W.
- Location: Ikoyi, Lagos, Nigeria
- Surface: grass

Construction
- Opened: 1904

Website
- www.lagospolong.com

Lagos Polo Club (LPC) is a polo club and event venue in Southwest Ikoyi, Lagos, Nigeria.

== History ==
The oldest polo club in Nigeria, Lagos Polo Club (LPC) was founded in 1904 by a team of British Naval Officers who loved the sport of horse riding and horse racing. Played on an air strip set on an old British Army Parade ground, it served as an entertainment hotspot for colonial officials who had previously played the sport in England. The Lagos Polo Club has many playing and social members. With its yearly tournaments, standard horse riding academy, and affiliations with international organisations, the club has grown to become the most famous polo club in Nigeria. More Nigerians started picking up the game in the mid-20th century. Since inception, the club has grown considerably and it is now the most famous polo club in Nigeria in terms of membership and quality of polo. The club has also seen an increasing number of lady players – both professionals and patrons – highlighting the rise in women's polo across the globe. The Lagos Polo Club is a private members’ club and its affiliated with the Nigerian Polo Association (NPA). The LPC adheres to the Hurlingham Polo Association (HPA) rules at all in-house and international polo tournaments. In 2019, Lagos Polo Club launched its Riding Academy which is aimed to teach the public horse riding with a view of playing polo. The Lagos Polo Club's Eden Project involves massive landscape transformation with tree planting of over 160 trees around the club and its environment to re-create a new vista in the heart of Ikoyi, support and strengthen the climate and ecosystem's resilience. The Eden Project is a means to improve the environment, air quality in a sustainable manner. For several decades, the Lagos Polo club has also been a social spot for Nigeria's elites.

== Tournaments ==
The club's season starts in November and finishes in June, hosting more than 300 matches each year. Every year, the Lagos Polo Club holds one main tournament, Lagos International Polo Tournament held around February and March for a two-week period and several mini tournaments. It is the largest Polo tournament in Africa as it attracts large number of polo players and lovers from several countries. It is arguably one of the biggest social events in Nigeria. Also, professional polo players all the way from Argentina come to participate in the tournaments. A historical feat was achieved at the grand finale of the Lagos Polo Tournament on 18 February 2020 which featured 39 amazing polo teams-the highest in the history of NPA Tournaments.

=== Lagos International Polo Tournament ===
The main tournament is the Lagos International Polo Tournament held around February and March for a two-week period. It is the largest Polo tournament in Africa as it attracts a large number of polo players and lovers from several countries.

=== Main Tournament ===
The Lagos Polo Club International tournament is the biggest tournament held in Nigeria and it is held once every year between the months of January - March. The cups played during the tournament are;

- Majekodunmi Cup: +15 above
- Lagos Open Cup: +8 to +12
- Lagos Low Cup: +3 to +7
- Silver Cup: -2 to +2

=== Mini Tournaments ===
- Captains’ Cup
- Presidents’ Cup
- Windmill Cup
- Santa Gold Cup
- Easter Cup

==== Captains Cup ====
- Low Goal (+2 to +4) played in Late November/December

The Captains Cup is the first tournament of the season. This low goal tournament kick starts the season for players, horses and even guests. Teams are named after past captains of Lagos Polo Club and made up of playing members.

==== The Santa Gold Cup ====
- Low Goal (-2 to +2) Played on 26 December (Boxing day)

The Santa Gold Cup is traditionally played on Boxing Day by playing members only. The tournament is a favorite during the festive season because it attracts many families, friends and enthusiast.

==== President’s Cup ====
- Low Goal (+2 to +4) played in Late March.

This is one of the oldest tournaments hosted by the club. This tournament is usually played after the Lagos International Polo Tournament. Characterized by high-octane polo played at a time in the season when horses and players at their peak. The teams are named after past presidents of the club.

==== Windmill Trophy by Millfield School ====
- Low Goal (-2 to +2) played in December

The Windmill Trophy was donated to Lagos Polo Club by Millfield School many years ago. The idea behind this tournament was borne out of the club's strong desire to encourage budding youngsters who are playing top class polo in various schools all over the world. It is a special weekend set aside for children, youths and family.

==== Easter Cup ====
- Low Goal (+2 to +4) played in April

The Easter Cup is the grand finale of the polo season as it ushers in the rainy season, which signals the end of Polo in Lagos. Playing members keenly contest this Low Goal Tournament over the Easter weekend.
