= GET Arena =

Sports and entertainment venue in Lagos, Nigeria

Coordinates: 6.4282°N 3.4219°E

GET Arena is a kart racing venue in Lekki, Lagos, Nigeria, opposite Oriental Hotel. It has been closed down permanently. The venue also incorporates eateries among other facilities as an event center to host social gatherings.
