= List of festivals in Lagos =

Cultural festivals in Lagos

Lagos State, Nigeria is home to various festivals.

== Cultural festivals ==
=== Eyo festival ===
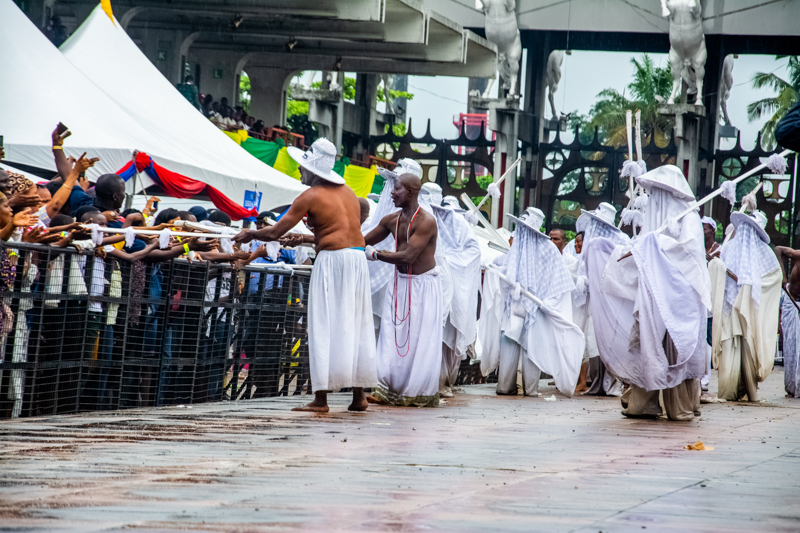
Eyo festival at TBS, Lagos

The Eyo festival, celebrated on Lagos Island, features white-clad masquerades wielding long staffs. Its origins trace back to 1854, initially held to guide the soul of a departed Lagos King or Chief and to usher in a new monarch. Over the past 25 years, the festival has occurred thrice and has expanded its purpose to include celebrations of notable individuals.

=== Gẹlẹdẹ festival ===
The Gẹlẹdẹ festival holds strong in the Ikorodu local government area of Lagos State. This festival, associated with the Gẹlẹdẹ society, involves both men and women.

=== Lagos Black Heritage Festival ===
The Lagos Black Heritage Festival encompasses a range of performances, from traditional to contemporary dances, drama, music, painting, and photography exhibitions.

== Arts festivals ==
=== Lagos Book and Art Festival ===
The Lagos Book and Art Festival (LABAF), established in 1999, serves as a catalyst for promoting the cultural significance of books. It aims to kindle interest in reading and writing in indigenous languages in Nigeria. This annual seven-day festival takes place across various venues, including the Goethe-Institute, the British Council, and Freedom Park, all situated in Lagos State.

== Food festivals ==
=== Lagos Food Festival ===
The Lagos Food Festival is an annual event which celebrates Nigerian cuisine and delicacies, and is held during the Independence Weekend holiday.

=== GTBank Food and Drink ===
The GTBank Food and Drink Festival is an annual multi-day event organized by Guaranty Trust Bank. The inaugural two-day edition was held in 2016, followed by subsequent four-day events.

== Entertainment festivals ==
=== Felabration ===
Felabration is an annual music festival inaugurated in 1998 by Yeni Anikulapo-Kuti to honor the legacy of her father, Fela Kuti, a Nigerian musician and pioneer of the Afrobeat music genre, as well as a human rights activist. The festival, held at the New Afrika Shrine in Ikeja, spans a week (aligning with Kuti's birthday), and is endorsed by the Lagos State Government.

=== The Experience Lagos ===
The Experience is an annual gospel music concert held at the Tafawa Balewa Square on Lagos Island. Led by Paul Adefarasin, the lead pastor of House on the Rock, the event debuted in 2005.

The Experience featured Kirk Franklin, CeCe Winans, Donnie McClurkin, Don Moen, Frank Edwards, Nathaniel Bassey, and Chioma Jesus. The music direction has been under the guidance of Wilson Joel since 2013.
