= Ifako International School =

Ifako International Secondary School
- Ifako-Ijaiye, Lagos State; Nigeria

Information
- Type: Private
- Motto: "The Child is the father of the man" and "Knowledge Knows no bounds" for primary and secondary respectively
- Established: 1974 while secondary section started 1987.
- Principal: Mrs Osansona Y.G
- Campus: Urban, 70acres (0.29 km²)
- Colors: Royal blue and white for nursery and primary, navy blue and sky blue for secondary section
- Website: ifako.sch.ng

Ifako International Schools are co-education schools founded in 1974 in Ifako-Ijaiye Ifako, Lagos, Nigeria. It provides nursery, primary and secondary education systems.

== History ==
In 1975 the school graduated the first form one students. In 1978, Ifako International Schools were approved to run secondary school programs by Lagos State Government. From 1982 to 1983, Lagos state government policy prevented the school from participating in School Leaving certificate examinations, though from 1984 onward, the school has been participating in the examinations.
