= Kilimanjaro (restaurant) =

Nigerian fast food restaurant chain

- Type: Subsidiary
- Industry: Restaurant
- Founded: 2004
- Headquarters: Port Harcourt, Nigeria
- Key people: Ebele Enunwa (Founder, CEO)
- Products: Fast food, Nigerian cuisine
- Owner: Sundry Foods Limited
- Number of employees: 4,000 (2026)
- Website: https://www.kilimanjaro-restaurants.com/

Kilimanjaro is a Nigerian quick-service restaurant (QSR) chain owned and operated by Sundry Foods Limited. Headquartered in Port Harcourt, Rivers State, the chain serves Nigerian cuisine and other contemporary dishes, as well as pastries, sandwiches and beverages. It operates restaurants in multiple Nigerian states and offers dine-in, takeaway and delivery services.

== History ==
Kilimanjaro originated in Port Harcourt as part of the expansion of Sundry Foods, a Nigerian food-service company founded by Ebele Enunwa. Sundry Foods was incorporated in 2003 and commenced operations in 2004. Its first operation was a bakery in Eleme, Rivers State, after which the company expanded into restaurant services. The chain was developed around the idea of providing freshly prepared Nigerian meals through a standardized quick-service format.

Kilimanjaro was launched in 2004 by Sundry Foods Limited, an integrated food services company founded by Ebele Enunwa in Port Harcourt. The chain was established to offer quick-service local and continental meals tailored to Nigerian consumer preferences.

Following initial success in Port Harcourt, the company began expanding nationally:

- 2009: Opened its first branch in the Federal Capital Territory (Abuja) at Maitama.
- 2012: Expanded into Lagos State with an outlet on Ozumba Mbadiwe Avenue, Victoria Island.
- 2012–2016: Entered the South-East region (starting with Enugu's Polo Park Mall) and South-South regions (such as Yenagoa, Bayelsa State).
- 2017: Underwent a comprehensive brand refresh that modernized store designs and streamlined operations for rapid national expansion.
- 2019: Norwegian private equity fund Norfund invested in parent company Sundry Foods Limited to finance its nationwide restaurant footprint expansion.
- 2021–2024: Expanded into South-West and Northern markets, opening branches in Ibadan (Oyo State), Ilorin (Kwara State), and multiple locations in Kaduna.

== Corporate Structure ==
Kilimanjaro operates as the flagship QSR brand of Sundry Foods Limited (SFL). Sundry Foods also operates related food service brands, including Pizza Jungle, Nibbles Creamery, KiliGrill, and Sundry Bakery.

== Menu and Operations ==
Kilimanjaro specializes in Nigerian fast food, combining traditional recipes with standard quick-service operating models.

- Cuisine: Offers staples such as jollof rice, fried rice, pounded yam, egusi soup, edikang ikong, fried chicken, plantains, and meat pies.
- Format: Outlets operate in standalone commercial buildings, shopping malls (such as Delta Mall in Asaba and Polo Park Mall in Enugu), and high-traffic transit hubs.
- Digital Services: In July 2023, Kilimanjaro introduced Lulu, a WhatsApp-based AI chatbot designed to automate customer ordering, payment, and meal delivery.

== See also ==
- List of restaurants in Lagos
