= Isolog schools =

Private school in Nigeria

Isolog Schools

Location
- Lagos; Nigeria

District information
- Type: Private
- Motto: Christ Is Our Cornerstone.
- Established: 1998

Students and staff
- Colors: Grey

Other information
- Website: Official website

Isolog Schools is a privately owned primary and secondary institution with a main campus in Akute, Ogun State and another in Ojodu, Lagos State, southern Nigeria.

== Tenth anniversary ==
The Chairman/CEO of the group of schools is Engr Isaac Ogunidipe. and vice chairperson/Proprietor is Mrs Rachel Ogundipe. Celebrations were held at Isolog Junior School, Akute, Ogun State for the tenth anniversary.
