= Grace Schools =

Location
- Plot 241 Ajidagan Street, Gbagada Estate, Lagos; Nigeria
- Coordinates: 6.5465°N 3.3784°E

Information
- Type: Private, day and boarding
- Motto: Raising a total child
- Established: 28 January 1968
- Founder: Deaconess Grace Bisola Osinowo (1928-2011: 83yrs)
- Director: Iyiola Olatokunbo Edun
- Principal: Dr. Bernard
- Head of school: Dr OLANIKE AKINDAYO
- Faculty: 155
- Grades: Cradle to Pre-University
- Enrollment: 522 (Nursery & Primary), 650 (Secondary)
- Campus type: Urban
- Colors: Green and red
- Website: www.graceschools.net

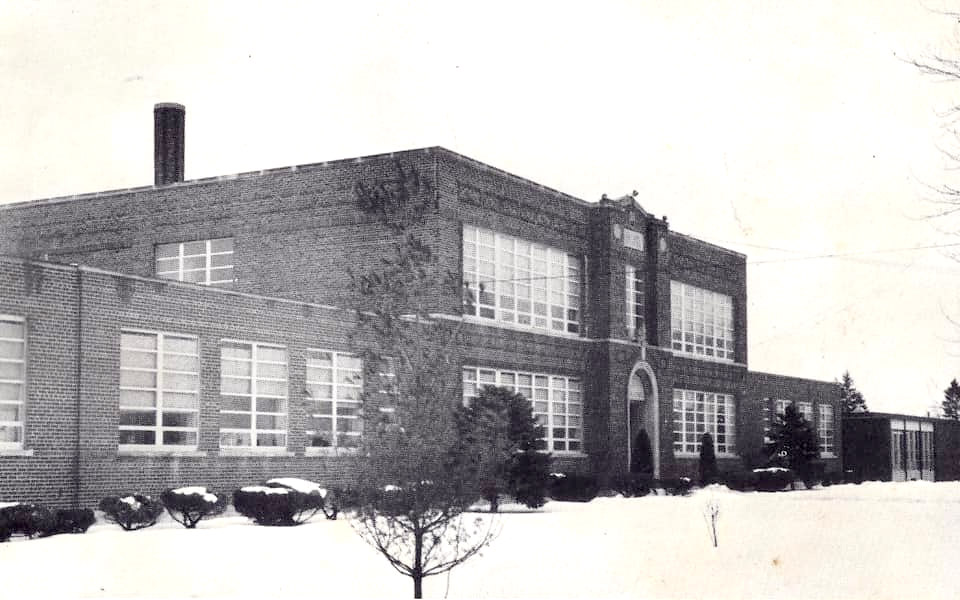

Grace Schools is a co-educational school founded in Gbagada, Lagos, Nigeria in the year 1968. The school is divided into four sections: the Nursery, the Primary, Secondary School and the Pre-University.

== History ==
The school was founded by Deaconess Grace Bisola Oshinowo. It started its high school in 1994. Facilities in the school include:

- Air-Conditioned Classrooms
- Technical Workshop
- Sciences Laboratory
- Library
- Zoo
- Art Studios
- Clinic
- Ultramodern Multipurpose Hall
- Sports Field
