= Redeemer's International Secondary School =

Redeemer's International Secondary School (RISS)

Location
- 9 Mobolaji Bank Anthony Way, Onigbongbo Maryland, Lagos; Nigeria
- Coordinates: 6°34′29″N 3°21′53″E

Information
- Motto: Excellence, Knowledge & Wisdom
- Established: October 14, 1996
- Chairman: Pastor Ben Akabueze
- Principal: Mrs Feyisara Osinupebi
- Grades: JSS 1-3, SSS 1-3
- Gender: Mixed
- Colours: Blue and Green
- Website: https://rissedenplace.org/

The Redeemer's International Secondary School is a co-educational private secondary school located in Maryland, Lagos, Nigeria. It was founded in 1997. It is part of the Christ the Redeemer's School Movement (CRSM). The current principal is Mrs. Feyisara Osinupebi.

== History ==
In 2017, the Redeemer's International Secondary School was one of four schools to win the International School Award from the British Council Nigeria, the others being Hallel College in Port Harcourt, Oxbridge College in Lagos, and Start-rite Schools, Abuja The school was also accredited for having the best WASSCE result in 2015/16.
