= Kingsfield College =

Information
- School type: Boarding school
- Established: 2006; 20 years ago
- Gender: Mixed

Kingsfield College is a co-educational school founded in 2006. It is situated in Ikorodu Local Government Area of Lagos State, Nigeria. It provides a high school and junior high school curriculum, including preparation for the Cambridge International Examination.

== Background ==
Kings Field College is a boarding and day school. It's accredited by Lagos state Ministry of Education and West African Examinations Council. It runs an education development academics with majors in skills acquisition and environmental interaction.

== Curriculum and extracurricular activities ==
The school has a curriculum committee which comprises Administrators, Teachers, and Parents. They are in charge of reviewing the school curriculum. The academic curriculum is made up of Nigerian and British versions. The academy engages in a series of extracurricular activities such as the literary and debating societies, the Press, Cultural and Heritage Society, and Business Club.

== School boarding ==
The school operates a boarding system. Bedrooms are shared by students in small groups of 4-6 students. A staff-run hostel is another component of the school accommodations which promotes socialization and networking among the students. The hostel is governed by the rules and regulation of the school authority.

== See also ==
- British International School Lagos
