= Gbagada General Hospital =

Hospital in Lagos, Nigeria

Coordinates: 6.55256°N 3.3871°E

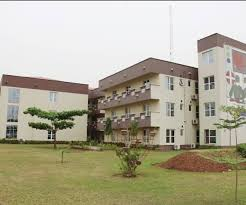

Geography
- Location: Lagos, Southwest, Lagos state , Nigeria

Organisation
- Type: General hospital

Services
- Emergency department: Yes

History
- Constructed: 1972

Links
- Website: https://gbagadagh.org.ng/
- Lists: Hospitals in Nigeria

Gbagada General Hospital is a general hospital in Lagos, Nigeria.

== History ==
Gbagada General hospital was founded in 1972 by the then Governor of Lagos state, Lateef Jakande. It also serve as the annex for Lagos State University Teaching Hospital. The chief medical director reports that it receives around 800 patients every day.

The multi-specialty hospital which is situated inside a large expanse of land has a host of highly experienced doctors and has over ten major clinical departments.

In 2020, a wing for COVID-19 patients was opened within the hospital with 118 beds.

== Chief Medical Director ==
The former chief medical director of the medical facility is Dr. Olusegun Joseph. The current chief medical director of Gbagada teaching hospital is Dr.Saliu Olugbenga Oseni je was appointed by the Lagos state government in May 2026.

== Commission ==
On 26 March 2025, the first therapeutic playroom in Lagos State was commissioned at the hospital.

=== Outreach ===
On 25 March 2025 there was an extension of Saudi Arabia eye Care outreach the hospital in Lagos state.

=== Renovation ===
On 10 November 2024, Heal the World Foundation renovated a part in the medical facility, alongside a donation of some medical equipments.

In 2023 The ICU unit of the hospital was renovated by NGO.
