= List of restaurants in Lagos =

This is a list of notable restaurants in Lagos, Nigeria.

== Restaurants in Lagos ==
- Bogobiri House
- Hard Rock Cafe
- Terra Kulture
- Veggie Victory
- Kilimanjaro (restaurant)

== See also ==
- List of restaurants
- Companies based in Lagos (category)
