= Federal Secretariat =

Building in Ikoyi, Lagos

The Federal Secretariat is a 15 storey building in Ikoyi, Lagos.

== History ==
The building was built in 1976 for the Nigerian Federal Civil Service. The building's intended purpose ceased in 1991 after Lagos' status as Nigeria's capital was transferred to Abuja, FCT.

Since 2006, the building has been in the midst of legal disputes between the Lagos State Government and a property developer (Resort International Limited) who won the bid to manage the building from the Federal Government.

Although a part of the building was temporarily used by NAFDAC, the building has been in an abandoned state for the most part of its existence.
