= Longford International School =

Location
- 40-46, Kano Street, Ebute Metta, Lagos; Nigeria
- Coordinates: 6.4838°N 3.3866°E

Information
- Former names: Nigeria People's College (NIGERPECO) between 1962 and 1986, and Ago-Egba High School between 1986 and 2006
- Motto: Sine Labore Nil Prosperat (No Labour No Success)
- Established: 24 January 1962
- Website: www.longfordschools.org

Longford International School is a proprietary co-educational high school in Ebute Metta, Lagos, Nigeria. The school offers both Senior School and Junior School Certificate Examinations. It was founded on 24 January 1962; it was known as Nigeria People's College (NIGERPECO) between 1962 and 1986, and Ago-Egba High School between 1986 and 2006.
