= Imota rice mill =

Agricultural plant in Ikorodu, Nigeria

Coordinates: 6°38′16″N 3°40′03″E

The Imota rice mill is an agricultural plant in Ikorodu, a suburb of Lagos, Nigeria. It was built in 2021 and was inaugurated in 2023 with the commencement of full production.

== Description ==
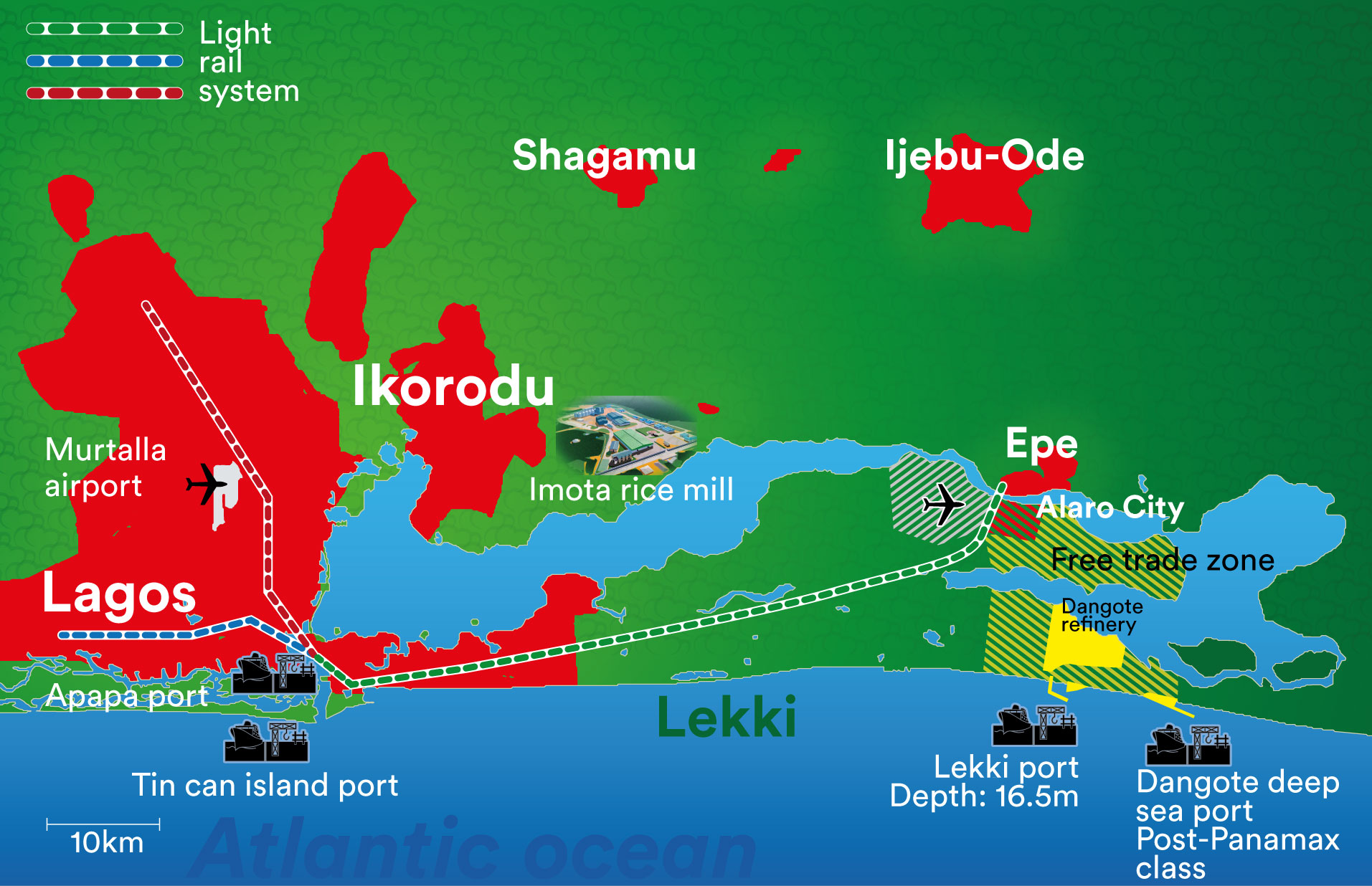
Location of the Imota rice mill

The Imota rice mill lot is 22 hectares, with the mill itself occupying 8.5 hectares. It is considered the largest rice mill in Africa and the third largest in the world. The facility has an annual production capacity of 2.8 million 50-kilogram bags of rice and is expected to generate approximately 1,500 direct jobs and 254,000 indirect jobs. Upon completion, based on the estimated installed infrastructure, the production capacity of the Imota rice mill will position it among the largest globally and the largest in sub-Saharan Africa.

It is an integrated mill with two warehouses and 16 silos (each with a capacity of 2,500 tonnes, 25 metres high, 40-year life). The mill operates in two lines that receive, pre-clean, boil, dry, sort, hull, polish and bag the rice. According to Demola Amure, senior partner, the mill is described as the "Rolls-Royce" of rice mills. The quality of the rice "will be second to none".

Only local staff were used for the assembly.

== Inauguration ==
On May 29, 2022, Ms Abisola Olusanya, the state Commissioner for Agriculture, assured that the Imota rice mill would be inaugurated "in 10 weeks" (which would be the first week of August 2022). "Paddy is already there. (...) I can't ascertain the figure but what I know is that the silos are being filled right now with paddy. They are already tested running the equipment." Ms Olusanya said.

In 2023, Muhammadu Buhari inaugurated the 32-metric tonnes per hour where he said the mill will support the rice revolution in Nigeria.

According to Governor Babajide Sanwo-Olu, the Rice mill is part of Buhari's agricultural revolution aimed at localizing the production of rice. The governor also stated that the development is part of an effort by Lagos state to support the rice and food revolution in Nigeria.

== Economic effect ==
According to Lagos State Governor Babajide Sanwo-Olu, the commencement of full-scale operations at the facility is expected to significantly lower the market price of rice and alleviate consumer demand pressures. In early 2022, Nigeria produced husk rice, yet imported hulled/polished rice at a higher price. Processing the national staple food rice in its own country therefore has hoped to improve Nigeria's trade balance.

== Technical process ==
In a rice mill, primarily, the cereals spelt, barley, oats, millet and rice are hulled, i.e. the husks that are firmly attached to the grain and do not fall off during threshing are removed (dehusking). The husks are indigestible for the human organism and would negatively influence the taste and chewing sensations. Furthermore, in a rice mill, the hulled cereal grains are usually also subsequently rolled (oat flakes), cut (groats) or polished (rice, rolled barley). Other possible processing steps are mostly identical to those in a grain mill.

== Machinery ==
The machines are from Bühler, a Swiss company that is one of the world's leading manufacturers of rice processing technologies. The plant is fully automated. The rice is not touched until it is packed into bags.

A local company, Henry Karll, installed the plant under the supervision of Bühler. They also train the operators. The project consultant, Faocon Nigeria Ltd, ensures that all parties work together harmoniously.

The water supply, treatment, filtration and reverse osmosis are being handled by a local company that has also worked for Coca-Cola, Pepsi and Nigerian Breweries.

== Surroundings ==
The State Government is also developing an industrial park adjacent to the mill. Governor Sanwo-Olu said the park would have amenities that would make businesses thrive and bring returns on investment to business owners.

== Outlook ==
In order to facilitate a seamless supply of input for the facility, Lagos will undertake a backward integration strategy in the form of collaboration with other Nigerian states such as Kwara, Sokoto, Benue, Borno and Kebbi to meet the paddy requirement of the mill.

The rice from Imota rice mill will go on sale in December 2022 under the trademark of "Eko rice".

The price of a 50 kg bag of rice has increased from 32,000 Naira (64 US-Dollars) to 48,000 Naira (96 US-Dollars) in the second half of 2022, representing 50% inflation as many Nigerian rice farms have been flooded in October 2022.
