= Lebanese Community School =

International school in Lagos, Nigeria

Lebanese International School Arabic: مدرسة الجالية اللبنانية
- Type: Private
- Established: 1964
- Principal: Mr. Emanuele Pesoli
- Location: 6 Maye Street, Lagos, Nigeria; 6°30′29″N 3°22′25″E
- Campus: Urban
- Website: http://lislagos.com/

The Lebanese International School is a private school in Yaba, Lagos, Nigeria. Commissioned in 1964 by the Lebanese embassy with classes ranging from kindergarten to twelfth grade, the embassy is still in charge of the school's board of trustees, which includes the Lebanese ambassador. Lebanese International School's Curriculum is mainly British based. Its language of instruction is English, but its Lebanese students often use both English and Arabic to communicate. Nationalities of students in the school include Nigerians, Lebanese, Syrians, Indians, Pakistanis and Germans.

== Facilities ==
The school's facilities include an auditorium, computer laboratory, a television room, and an art room. An indoor gymnasium, outdoor basketball court and laboratories for biology, chemistry, and physics were added during its renovation in the mid-1990s. It also has a library and a take-away cafeteria. The school also has fairly sized classrooms with ACs and whiteboards. Teachers and HODs also have their own staff room.

== International examinations on offer ==
The school provides tenth, eleventh and twelfth grade students the opportunity to take the SAT I, SAT II, TOEFL, as well as University of Cambridge International Examinations such as IGCSE, AS Level and A Level examinations to qualify for admittance into foreign universities. Many students go on to attend colleges in Lebanon, Europe, Singapore, the United States, and Canada In the early 2000s (decade), the school attained the permission to becoming a recognized International Cambridge Examination Center, with center number: NG193.

== School anthem ==
The school anthem was originally composed by a former principal of the school, Mr. Salem Abdul-Baki. In 1997, during a routine assembly, he played the audio version of the anthem via radio to hundreds of students on the basketball field.

Arabic

معهدي يا نفحة من أدب
فجر نور ساطع لم يغب
معهدي يا نفحة من أدب
فجر نور ساطع لم يغب
ينشر العلم ويعلي رايه
نتحدى زاهيات الشهب
معهدي يا معهدي يا نفحة من أدب

Transliteration

Maa'hadee ya naf'hatan min adabi
Fajaru nuri saato'e llm ya'ghebe
Maa'hadee ya naf'hatan min adabi
Fajaru nuri saato'e llm ya'ghebe
Yan'sharu el-alama w yu'alee raa'yahu
Yan'hadden zehe'yaate el-shuhabe
Maa'hadee ya maa'hadee ya naf'hatan min adabi

English translation

My school you are a breath of culture
A dazzling horizon which never dims you are
My school you are a breath of culture
A dazzling horizon which never dims you are
Knowledge you spread and uphold its flag
A challenge to each bright star
My school, my school, oh my school, breath of culture

The Lebanese and Nigerian national anthems are also played on Monday mornings.
