= Yaba Bus Terminal =

Bus station in Lagos, Nigeria

Coordinates: 6°30′40″N 3°22′15″E

Yaba Bus Terminal is located along the Murtala Mohammed Way, Yaba Local Council Development Area in Lagos Mainland, an area of Lagos State, Nigeria. Yaba is a suburb which is located on the mainland in Lagos state. It has become a commercial, transportation, educational and entertainment hub. Yaba became a hub for various commercial activities, which has made it become a part of Lagos State Transportation Master Plan.

It was inaugurated in 2021 and was built by the Lagos Metropolitan Area Transport Authority (LAMATA), and publicly opened by the Lagos State Governor, Mr.Babajide Sanwo-Olu as part of a major transportation initiative. The bus terminal has been described as an "ultra-modern" structure.

== Facilities ==
The bus terminal is built with a loading and off-loading bay for up to 15 midi and 4 high capacity buses per loading time, it is convenient for 20 high capacity buses. It has public toilet, a stationed water treatment plant, perimeter fencing, perimeter lightning.

A 200KVA generator and 500KVA transformer have been stationed at the terminal to supply power. There is a Traffic system management (TSM), A walk-way for pedestrians,

The Terminal is built with an administrative building which has a control room, passenger's information display board, offices, commercial stores, an ATM point, a ticketing unit, sitting area, restaurant area with kitchenette and a waiting lounge on the first floor.

== Routes ==
- Lawanson - Itire
- Ijesha - Cele
- Iyana- Ipaja
- Ikeja
- Berger
- Oyingbo
- Akoka
