= State High School =

School located in Badagry, Lagos State

State High School is a public secondary school located at Ibereko, Badagry, Lagos State.
