= Festival Hotel Festac Lagos =

Hotel complex in Nigeria

Festival Hotel Festac Lagos is a mixed used hotel complex located along Amuwo - Mile 2 area of the Lagos–Badagry Expressway in Lagos, Nigeria. The hotel complex also houses a United Property Development Company (UPDC) mixed use development project, The Residences and the Festival Mall.

Festival Hotel Festac Lagos complex has evolved from its initial structure as apartment complexes built for second republic legislators and the Arewa Hotels managed Durbar Hotel into its present mixed use state.

== History ==
The initial complex was constructed by the Nigerian government to house members of the National Assembly until they moved to their residences at 1004 estate. Thereafter, the complex was turned into Durbar Hotel, Lagos, a top-of-the-line hotel with 520 rooms that was one of the largest hotels in West Africa at the time it was commissioned in 1982. The hotel was managed by Arewa Hotels who were managing both Hamdala and Durbar hotels in Kaduna.

== Redevelopment ==
=== Festival Hotel Festac Lagos ===
Durbar Hotel was redeveloped by investors as Golden Tulip Festac. It is the first hotel managed in Nigeria by the Groupe du Louvre. The hotel is set up to differentiate itself from competitors with the creation of a tropical garden. But the hotel is also known for its conference halls. It has 14 conference and meeting rooms. In 2018, Groupe du Louvre ceased managing the hotel, which was subsequently renamed the Festival Hotel Festac Lagos under the management of the Zurich-based Premium Swiss Hospitality.

=== The Residences ===
In 2016, United Property Development Company opened The Residences, a residential development on eight floors and consisting of 192 units. The intention of the developers is to construct an independent power plant that will ensure electricity supply to the residents.

=== Festival mall ===
Developed by UPDC, festival mall is a retail complex with Shoprite as the anchor. The redevelopment project was conceived as an entertainment and retail outlet for residents within the Amuwo-Odofin and Satellite Town, Lagos areas of Lagos. The mall has 46 stores occupying a space of 10,071 square meters. It is very close to diamond estate, which is along Festac extension. A part of Amuwo-Odofin local government.
