= Oshodi market =

Market in Lagos state, Nigeria

Oshodi Market was a market located in Oshodi, a suburb of Lagos state, southwestern Nigeria. It was one of the largest markets in the Lagos metropolis; government officials claimed it was blighted by criminal activity such as pickpocketing and bag snatching, and a decision was made to demolish the market. The market was razed in January 2016.

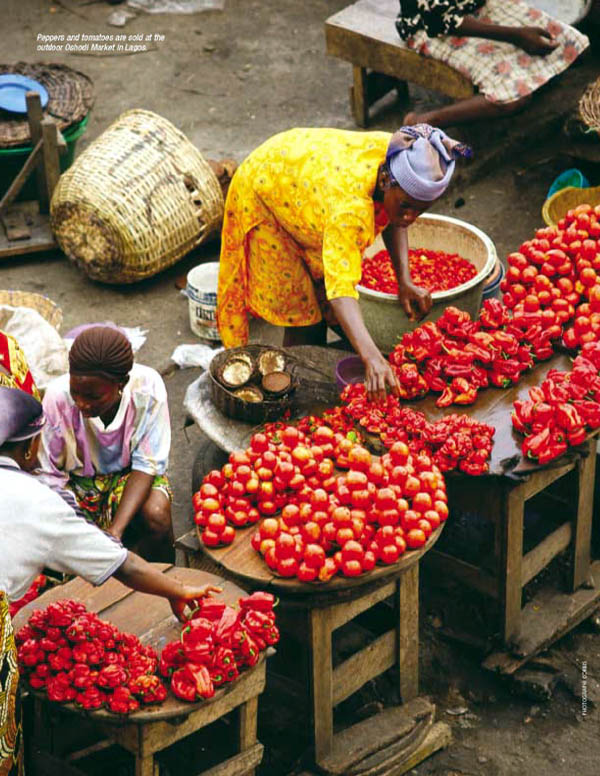
Oshodi market lagos

== History ==
The market was established in 1860, when Nigeria was under British colonial rule, to support its slave trade activities. Oshodi was one of the first beneficiaries of the urban boom that occurred in the 19th century. This was due to the construction of railway lines between Lagos and the North by the British-led government, for the transit of workers across the country.

== Demolition ==
The demolition of Oshodi Market was as a result of the Lagos State government directive to relocate the traders from the Owonifari market to Isopakodowo in Oshodi by the Akinwunmi Ambode led government on 5 January 2015. The state government claimed the space where the market currently occupied was originally proposed for a modern bus terminal, with the traders being relocated to the newly built Isopakodowo market stalls in the Bolade area. The new market was commissioned by the former governor of the state, Babatunde Fashola, with an investment worth N1 billion. There were many reasons for the government's action, which included threats to the security of the state by criminal activities perpetrated in the market, to conform with the state government mission of turning the state into a megacity and to accommodate the bus terminal.

The intention to make Lagos State a mega city is one of the main objectives of the administration of Ambode in Lagos state. In achieving this mission, the government of Lagos State government invested N1 billion on the construction of Isopakodowo in Bolade-Oshodi. The market was commissioned on 7 January 2014 by the Babatunde Fashola administration in Lagos State. The intention of the government was to relocate the traders in Owonifari market to the new complex after completion. However, the traders were reluctant to move. The new market accommodates over 600 shops and hundreds of kee Clamps. According to a meeting held on 16 December 2015, the executive council of the state led by governor Ambode met with the representative of the market, where the governor expressed a desire to relocate to the newly built market. At the end of the meeting the traders agreed with the request of the governor, however, they pleaded for a cheaper market place. In one of the press releases by the commissioner, Steve Ayorinde said “On Monday, December 21, 2015, it was eventually agreed that the traders would pay N5,000 for a shop at Isopakodowo Market. There are only a few places in Lagos where you will see a N5,000 shop, let alone in central Oshodi, but the governor agreed with them. We, thereafter, formally serve a notice to quit through the office of the Commissioner for Physical Planning and Urban Development.”

== Causes ==
Aside the fact that the government is pursuing a mission to turn Lagos State to a megacity, some of the other reasons giving by the state administrator include:

=== Insecurity ===
One of the key reasons stated by the government is the emergence of criminal activities at the market, which include the recovery of arms and ammunition inside the market, hidden places for hoodlums etc. According to a report in The Punch Newspaper, Owoseni, the commissioner for the police force in Lagos State, said: “the main issues that the Council looked at is a review of all the measures put in place in 2015 especially over Christmas that culminated in us having a peaceful celebration. “Having reviewed that, we looked at how we can sustain some of them that have been helpful to us and of course improve on other measures we think needs improvement. That basically were the major things that we have done and we have resolved that we will sustain those positive measures with a view to making Lagos State safer and more secured for social and economic development.” in another related development the State Commissioner for Information and Strategy, Steve Ayorinde, Said in “Guardian Newspaper" that the demolition exercise on Tuesday and Wednesday actually confirmed some of their fears, “as we discovered concrete bunkers and arms underneath the shops.” he also stressed that the government had earlier given a 16-day ultimatum for the traders to evacuate the market before the demolition.

==== Traffic congestion ====
The state government raised concern over the gridlock arising from the traffic by the volume of cars in and around Oshodi, partly caused by the flow of visitors to the market on a daily basis. The government believes if a bus terminal is built at Oshodi, it will take care of the traffic challenges in this area. The commissioner said “while markets would always be in Oshodi, some illegal structures already marked by the state government would have to be demolished to make way for traffic free-flow and crime-free Oshodi area”

== Controversies ==
The demolition of Oshodi market was very controversial. The Public Relations Officer, Obinna Nwosu, in his submission said “There is a court injunction that the government shouldn't disturb traders in our market because since its renovation in 1999 after the market got burnt, traders voluntarily re-built the market with N750million and every stall was decked. Does a seal order look like a quit notice? They assured us everything was going to be settled and that was the reason most of us returned our goods“. He also claimed that the market executives hadn't met to discuss the relocation before the action took place. Some of the traders also believe the facilities at the new market cannot accommodate them. Rumors of structural instability and spiritual activities are also some of the reasons the traders refused to accept the offer for the relocation by the state government.

Some of the officials that spoke out during the process unanimously declared their support for the action of the government. Taofeek Adaranijo, a member of the House of Representatives, representing Agege Federal Constituency, stated “When you go round other parts of the world, you will hardly see a market in such a place and constructing a bus terminal there will beautify the place and change the environment for good. It will add colour to the megacity that we are dreaming for Lagos and this is a bold step towards achieving the transformation plan. Segun Olulade, a member of Lagos State House of representatives, representing Epe constituency, believes the market has become a haven for criminals and a place to hide arms and ammunition.
