= Computer Village =

Market and IT nexus in Lagos, Nigeria

The Computer Village is an Information and Communications Technology (ICT) accessories market located in a community called Otigba, located at Ikeja, the capital of Lagos State, southwestern Nigeria. The market is the largest ICT accessory market in Africa. It is a perfect competition market, under the umbrella of the Computer and Allied Products Dealers Association of Nigeria (CAPDAN).

Apart from the sales of information and technology accessory, the markets also deals in the repair of mobile phones and computers. The computer and phone repairs could either be on software or hardware components depending on the nature of the fault.

The market and its wide range of business activities gives opportunities to computer engineers and technicians who specialized in the repair of faulty computers and mobile phone to transact businesses with dealers of ICT accessory, thereby creating job opportunities for them. The market is opened on a daily basis except on Sundays and public holidays. This daily business transactions and popularity has attracted new investors and ICT dealers across Africa thereby expanding the market size and population with profound effects on Lagos State economy.

The ICT accessory market was formerly located at Ogunlana Drive, Surulere in the early 1990s and its current location was a mere residential area and offices. Recently, Lagos State Government planned to relocate over 3000 traders from Otigba and building new facilities at the Katangowa site, a bustling 25-hectare (2,700,000 ft^{2}) market dealing mainly in clothes, shoes and textiles.

== Basic structural characteristics ==
The market is a Perfect market in which no dealer influences the price of the product it buys or sells within the market. There are huge number of buyers and sellers in the market coupled with a large number of consumers with willingness to buy the products at a certain price with respect to their need and income. There is no Barriers to entry and exit from the market, permitting long term adjustments to changing in the market conditions. ICT dealers and consumers have perfect knowledge of price, quality of the products and its utility with zero incur cost In course of their transactions. The market also permit buyers to make rational purchases on the basis of information and price knowledge.

== Criticisms ==
Certain activities in the market have strongly been criticized by a good number of people across the country, who have painfully experienced the loss of money and prized gadgets to the schemes of unqualified engineers and fraudsters, who use the chaotic market as a medium to rip off people or sell counterfeit products and services, such as mobile phones, software, accessories, etc. There are several stories about stolen phones that often find their way into the market, but these unlawful act are usually perpetrated by unregistered traders and Retailers, some of whom it behoves to transact on vehicles' hoods, walkways, and display units rather than a proper brick-and-mortar store. However, there are two major categories of traders in the market, the registered and unregistered or free traders, who often sell in a nomadic and unaccountable fashion. The later category of traders are easily the perpetrators of the crime in the market, given their drifting liberties. Nonetheless, mechanisms are getting established to ward against unauthorized dealers, sellers, and fixers.

== Photo Gallery ==
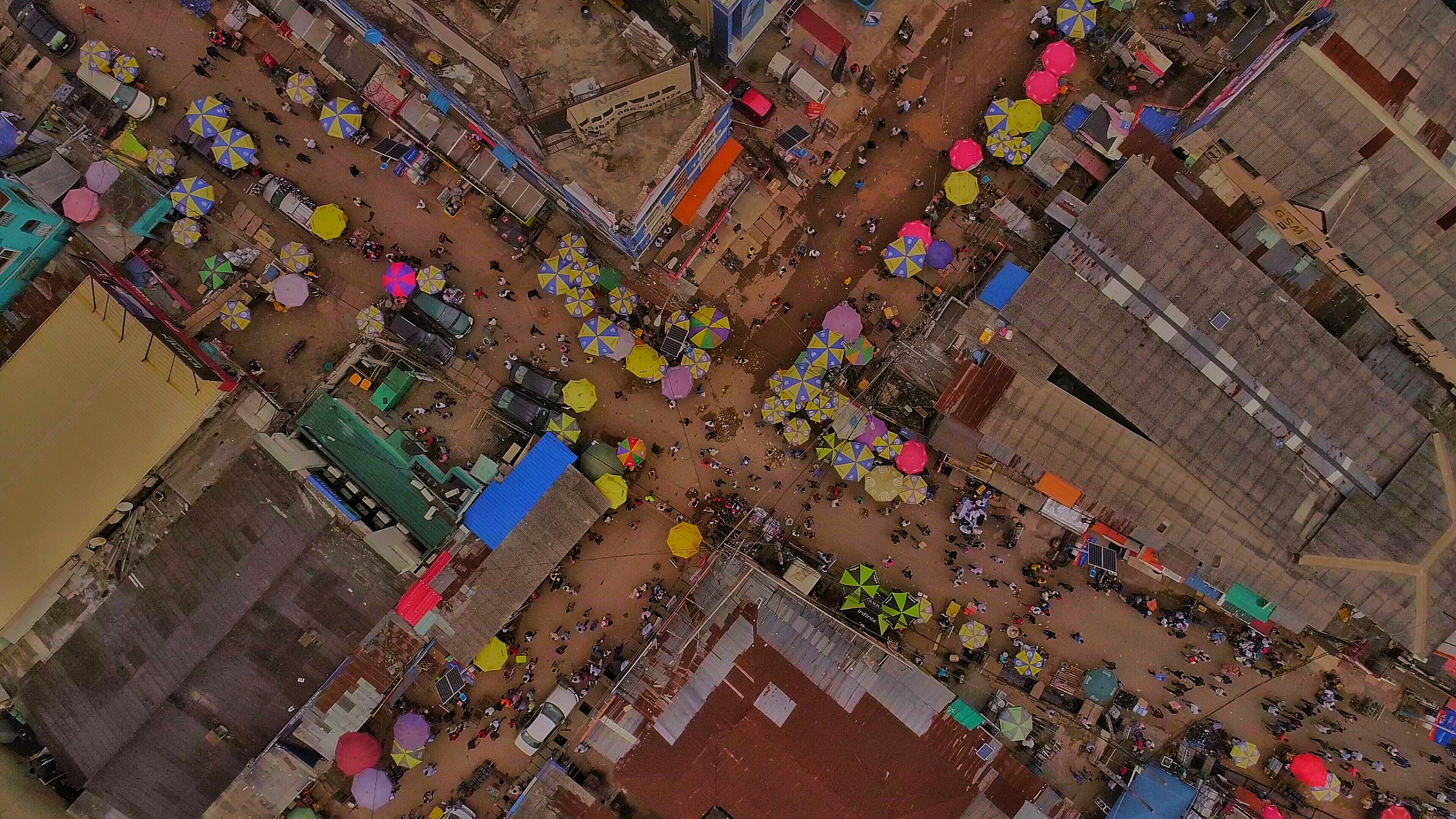
Computer Village from the air.

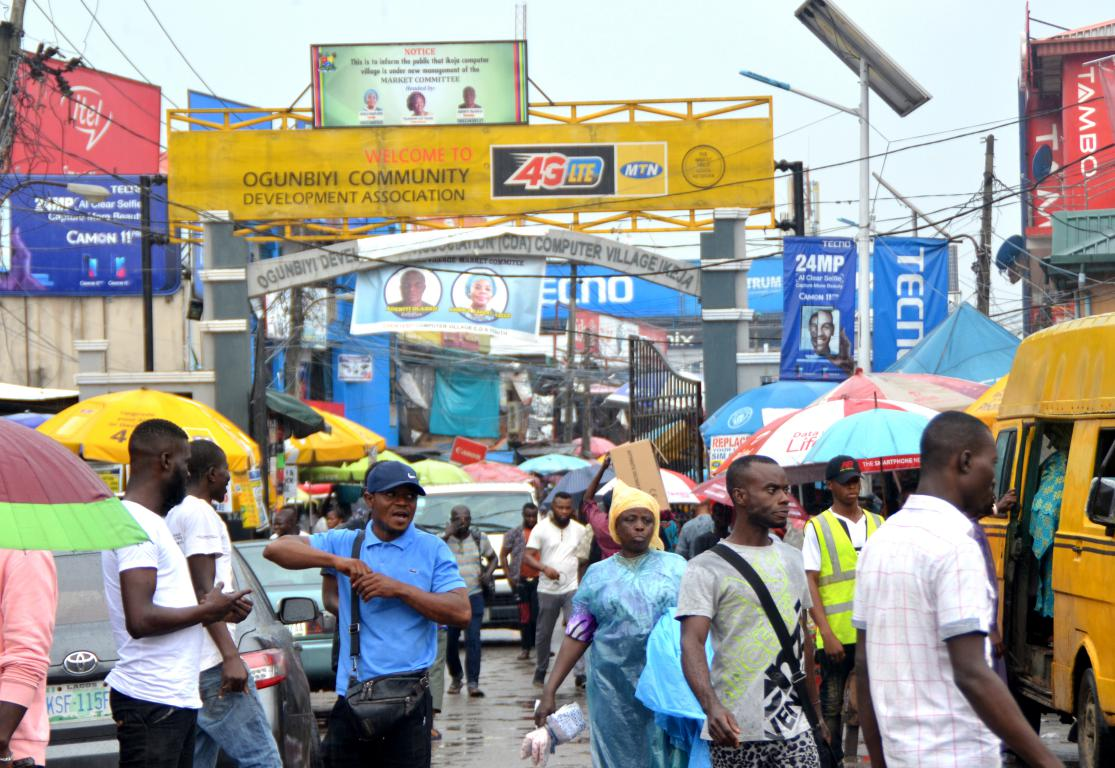
A section of Computer Village.

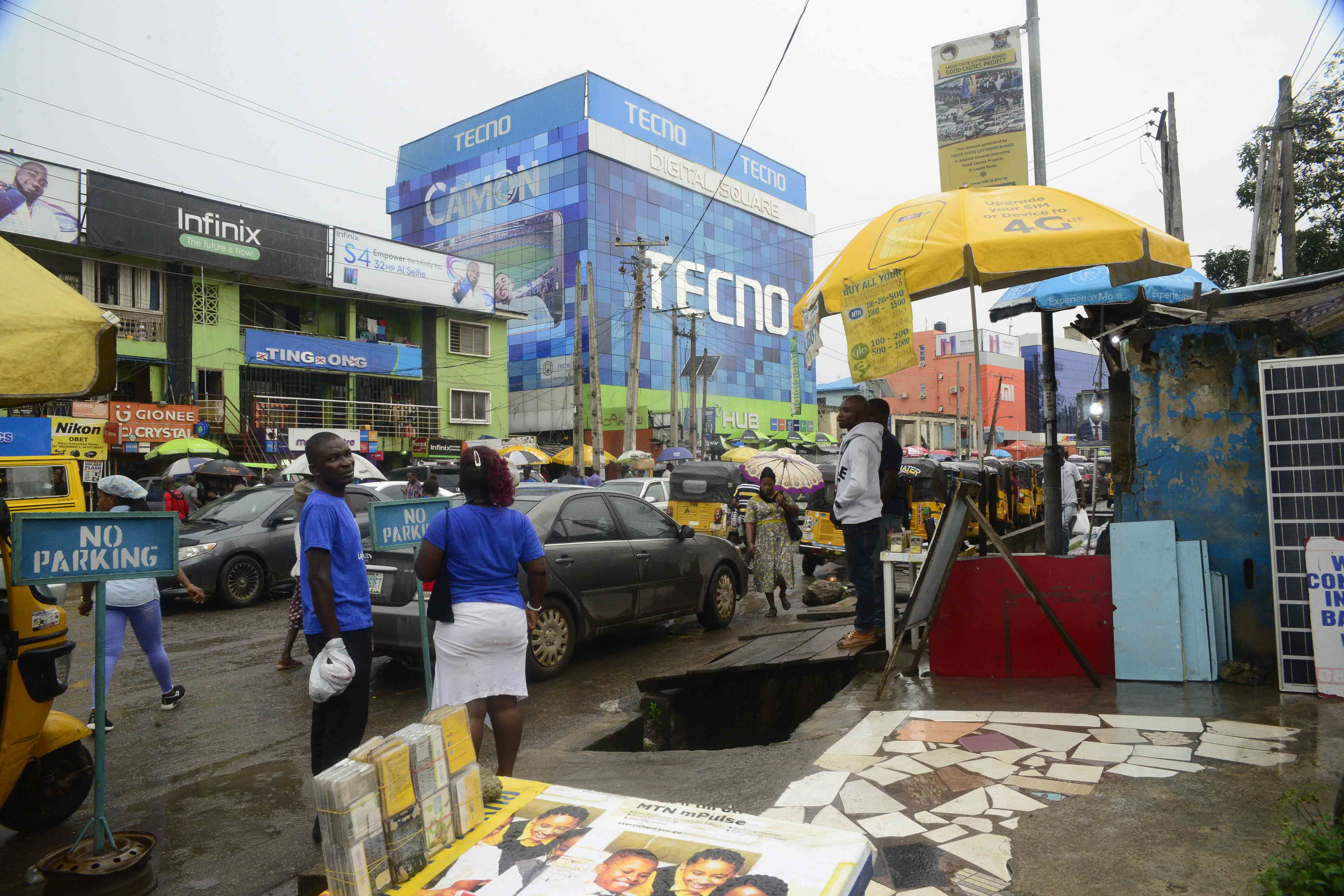
Digital Square featuring prominent Tecno advertising.

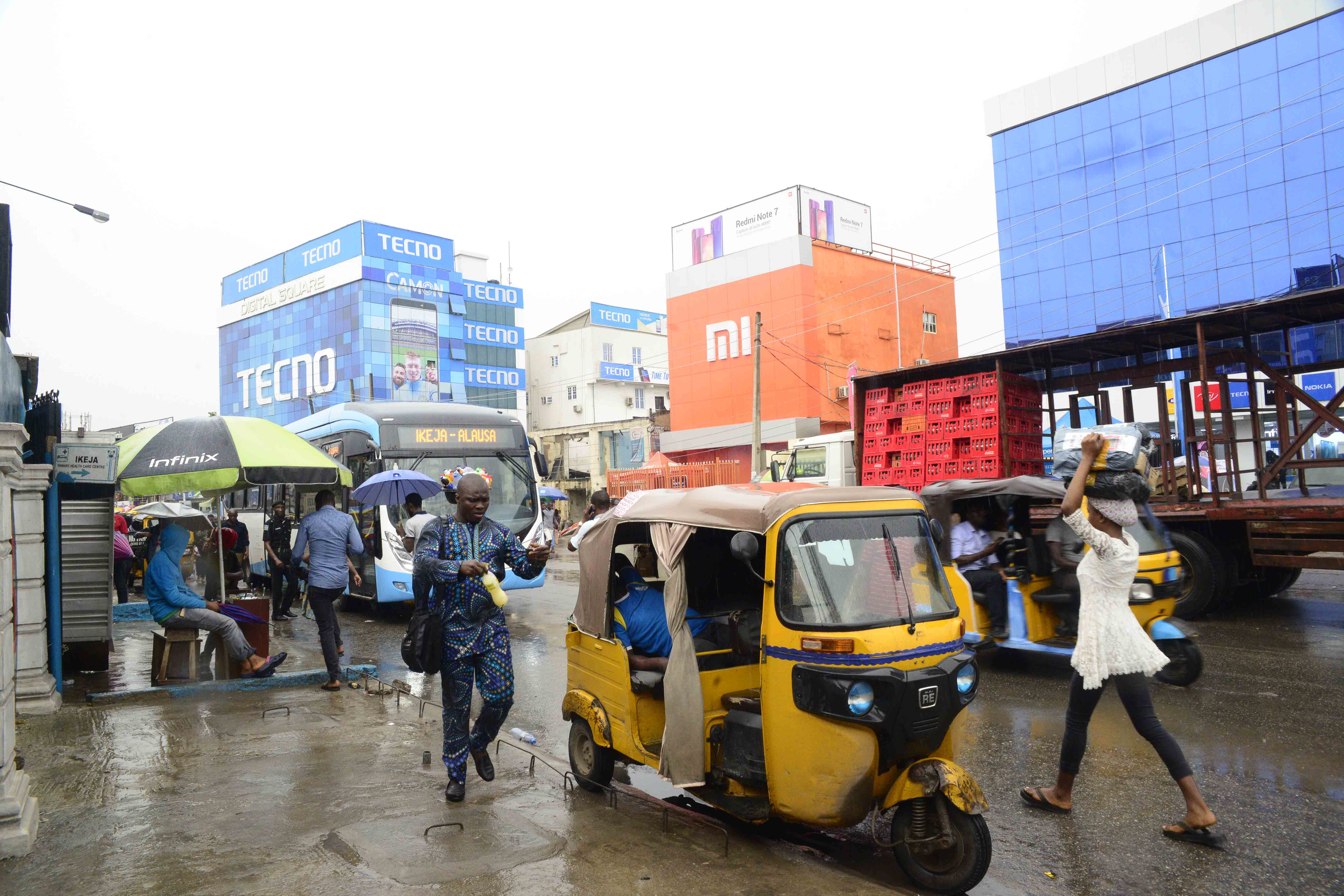
Xiaomi advertising in Computer Village.

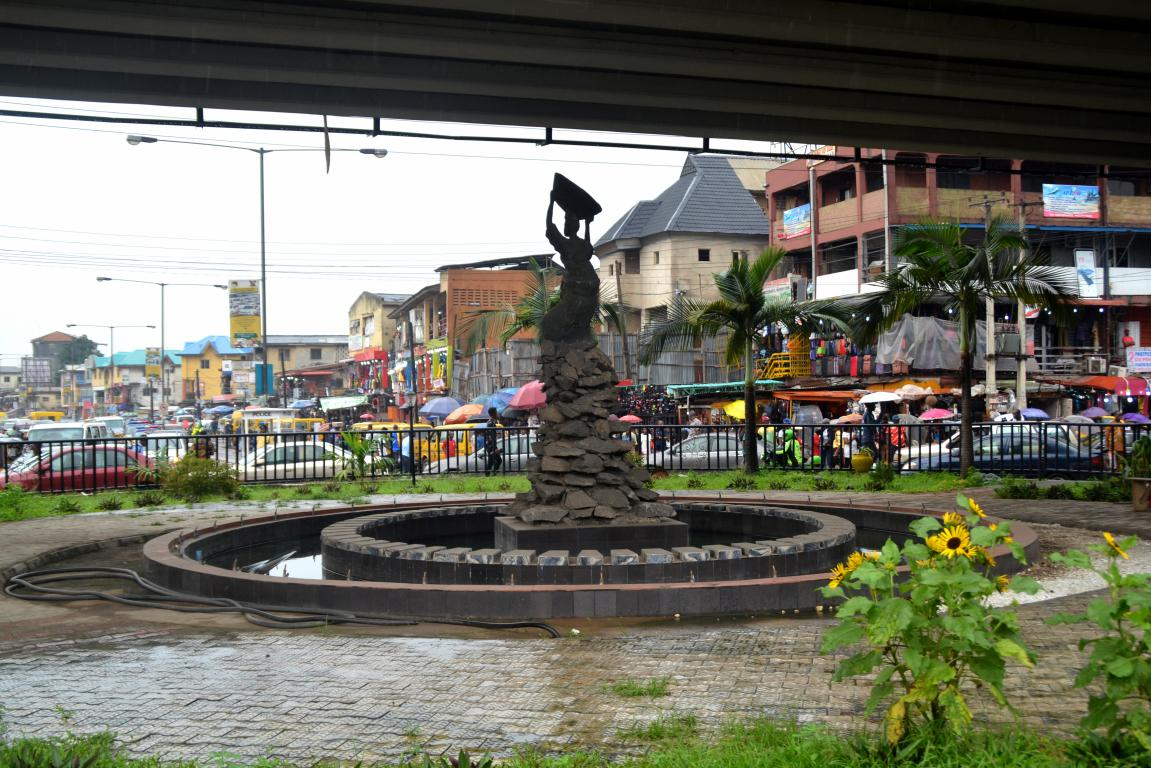
Monument near "Under Bridge" area.

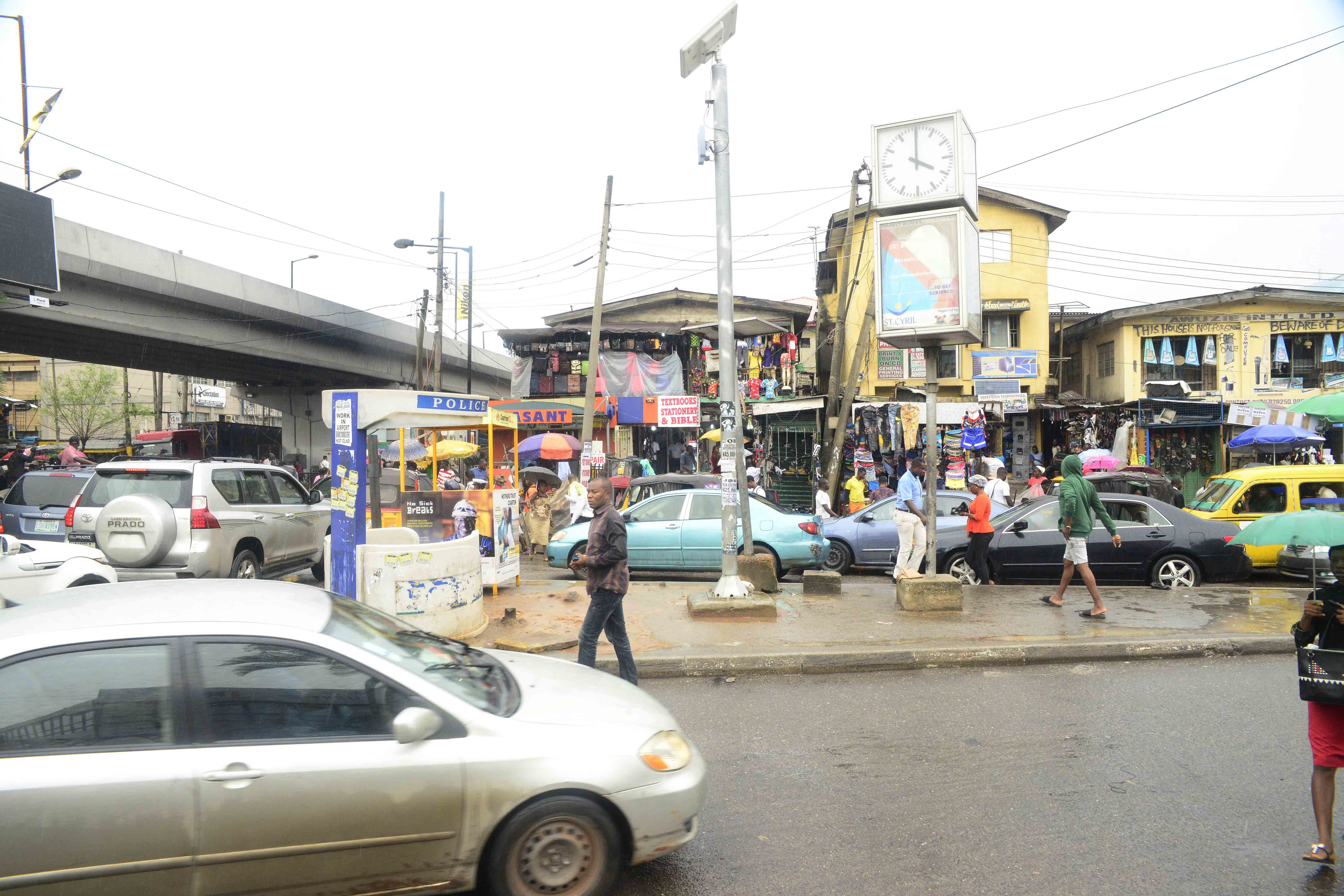
Shops, clock, and police booth near the "Under Bridge" area.

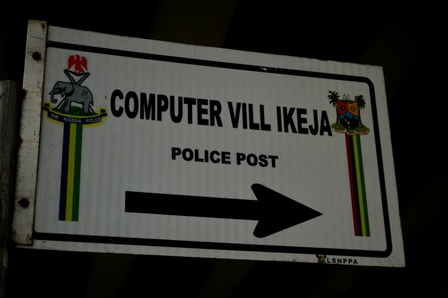
Computer Village Police post sign
