= British International School Lagos =

Coordinates: 6.43480°N 3.44921°E

- Victoria Island, Lagos; Nigeria

Information
- Established: 2001; 25 years ago
- Principal: Kelvin Donnelly
- Age: 11 to 18
- Website: https://bisnigeria.org/

British International School Lagos (BIS) is a British international school in Oniru Private Estate in Victoria Island, Lagos, Nigeria. Opening in 2001, the school provides the National Curriculum for England to day and boarding students aged 11–18. A broad range of IGCSE and A Level courses are available for study.

The pupil body comprises girls and boys from Nigerian and expatriate families. Classes have an average of 20 pupils and there is a comprehensive co-curricular programme available after school each day.

The campus is a large one, with the teaching buildings surrounded by playing fields, within which can be found a swimming pool along with tennis and basketball courts.

The teaching staff comprise both expatriate and locally qualified teachers. The current principal is Kelvin Donnelly, who joined the school in 2021 having worked in many schools in US, Malaysia, Cameroon and UK.

The school received an excellent inspection report from COBIS in the summer of 2018.

== History ==
Founded in 2001, the school has continued to develop throughout its history. In recent years new teaching blocks and sports facilities have been added. In 2018, additional science rooms were introduced to support the growth of the Sixth Form and in 2019, the building of the primary section commenced.

Significant investment has also taken place in the 5 school boarding houses, but in 2025/26 session the commissioned a new boarding house.

The School recently turned 25 years in 2026.

== Curriculum ==
BIS follows the English National Curriculum. This curriculum has been adapted, where appropriate, to ensure that it is tailored to meet the needs of an International School located in West Africa. Yoruba is taught to younger students and subject staff ensure that opportunities are provided to expand students' appreciation of the history, culture, geography and economy within which the school is placed.

== Facilities ==
The campus includes a multi-purpose hall; a swimming pool; a theatre; and suites for computers, music, and tutorials. Encomium Weekly described the school as being "the most modern in Lagos". In recent years the campus has been further adapted to allow students with limited mobility to participate fully in the life of the school. Due to the sheer size of its playing fields, the school grounds are often used to host inter-school sporting events.

== Pupil Success ==
Each year the school awards the "Dux Litterarum" cup to the most academically gifted scholar.

== Notable alumni ==
1. Davido - singer, songwriter and record producer
2. Ortisé Williams - singer, songwriter, and one-fourth of British boy band

== See also ==
- List of schools in Lagos
