= Parkview Estate, Ikoyi =

Suburb of Ikoyi, Laos

Parkview Estate is a suburb of Ikoyi in Lagos.

== History ==
In November 2017, an estate developing firm was sued by a home owner following the heavy floods that caused by structural defects.

In May 2018, a hotel opened in the Parkview Estate. On 31 October 2018, the chairman of Credit Switch Technology Chief Bademosi was murdered in his home in Parkview Estate.

== Description ==
Parkview Estate is bordered by the Gerrard Road and the Banana Island. The estate is majorly residential, with some private firms have offices and guest houses in the estate. It is considered one of the most expensive places to live in Lagos. The former minister of State for Defence Musiliu Obanikoro has a house in the Estate, along with real estate billionaire Olu Okeowo and the president of the Nigerian Football Federation Amaju Pinnick.

The estate also hosts several hotels like Pearl Court Residence & Hotels, Upperclass Suites and several others.

== See also ==
- Dolphin Estate
- Banana Island
