= TBS Bus Terminus =

Tafawa Balewa Square Bus Terminus, also known as TBS Bus Terminal, is situated at the center of Lagos Island, Lagos State, South West, Nigeria. The bus terminus is located on 45/57 Massey Bamgbose Street, Lagos Island.

The TBS Bus Terminal is housed by the Tafawa Balew Square, and was built in 1972 to celebrate the independence of Nigeria on 1 October 1960. On 18 March 2016, the administration of Akinwumi Ambode, former governor of Lagos State, concluded plans to revitalize the terminus to "further enhance the state's mega-city project". The new terminus was commissioned in 2017.

== Routes ==
- TBS - CMS
- TBS - Ikeja, Barracks
- TBS - Ajah, Lekki Routes
- TBS - Oshodi
- TBS - Berger
- TBS - Leventis
- TBS - Fadeyi
- TBS - Ikorodu
