= Food Logistics Park Lagos =

Food logistics centre in Nigeria

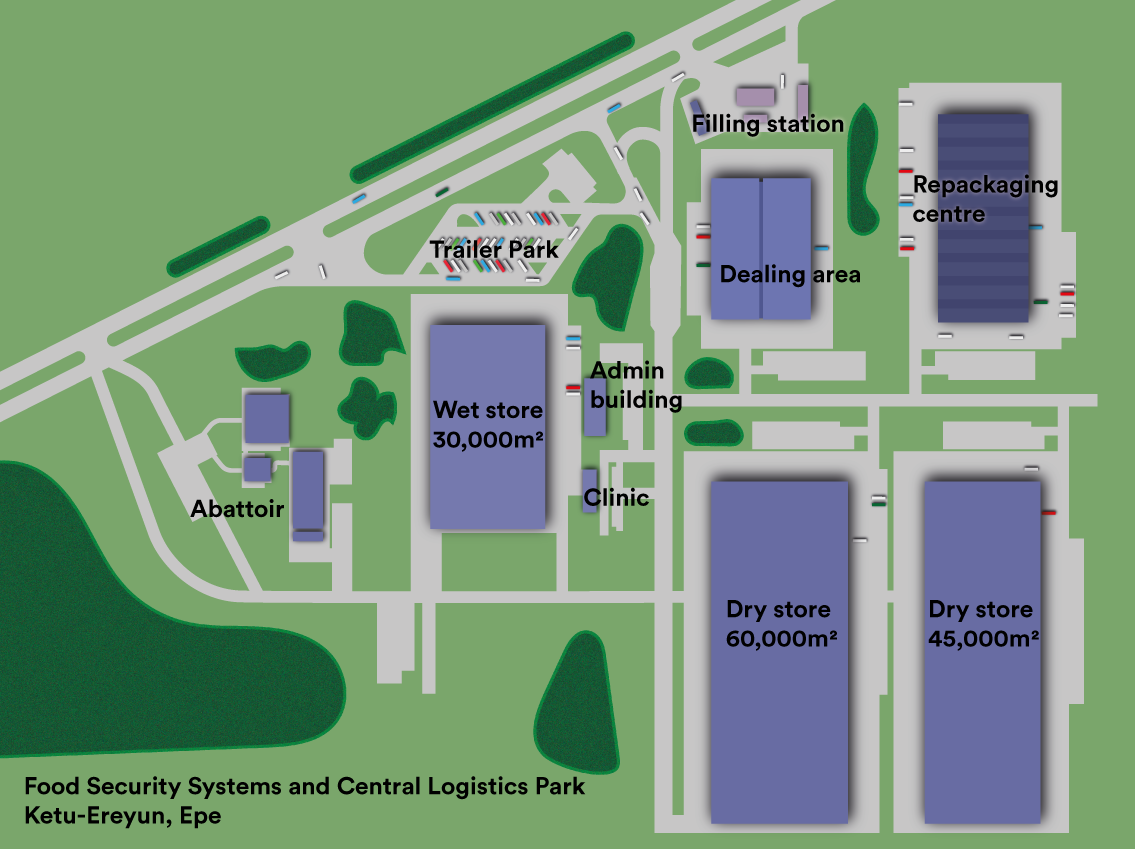
Food Security Systems and Central Logistics Park, close to Lagos

The Lagos Food Security Systems and Central Logistics Park is a logistics centre under construction in Ketu-Ereyun, between Epe and Ikorodu. When completed, it will be the largest food logistics centre in sub-Saharan Africa.

== Background ==
The annual value of food transactions in Lagos is estimated at USD 10 billion. However, farmers lose 40% of their produce every day because there is no post-harvest storage infrastructure.

When completed, the logistics centre is expected to provide direct income to more than five million traders in the agricultural value chain, while ensuring uninterrupted food supply to more than ten million Lagosians for at least ninety days in times of scarcity.

The central food hub is expected to secure higher returns for farmers and agribusiness investors, cut out a number of middlemen and improve access to sophisticated processing and packaging services. The logistics centre is expected to help reduce logistics costs while ensuring standardisation of the quantity and quality of agricultural products. It is also expected to improve productivity and guarantee higher yields to farmers by eliminating several middlemen. It is expected to provide farmers with better access to modern processing and packaging services and generate useful data for government agencies, private sector actors and multilateral organisations.

The use values from the logistics centre are also expected to enable the government to develop meaningful data for public planning and private sector investment forecasting.

The choice of location was significant for the project given its proximity to farming communities and ease of access.

== Construction ==
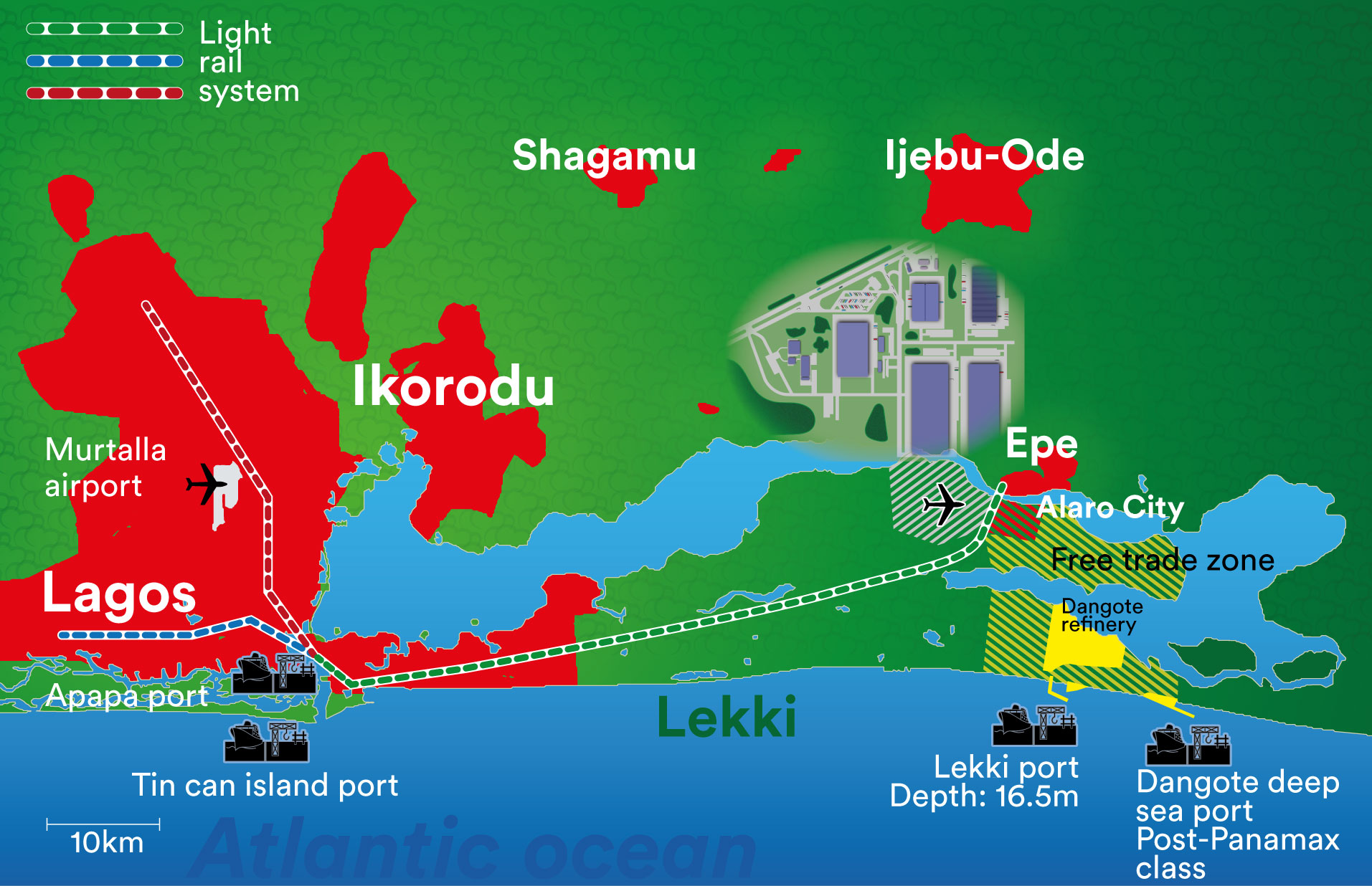
Logistics hub Lagos between Epe and Ikorodu

The plant is being built on a 1.2 million square metre site in Ketu-Ereyun, Epe. The facility will store the contents of more than 1 500 trucks and is expected to meet the daily needs of tens of thousands of actors in the food value chain throughout the year.

Construction began in August 2022 and the project is expected to be completed by the fourth quarter of 2024.
