= Bogobiri House =

- Interactive map of the Bogobiri House area

General information
- Type: Hotel and Restaurant
- Location: 9, Maitama Street, Ikoyi, Lagos, Nigeria
- Coordinates: 6.4433°N 3.4242°E
- Completed: 2003
- Owner: Chike Joseph Nwagbogu & Tola Akerele

Website
- http://www.bogobiri.com

Bogobiri House is an African-themed boutique hotel and restaurant located in 9 Maitama Sule Street Off Awolowo Road, South-West Ikoyi, Lagos, Nigeria.

== Description and decor ==
Bogobiri house is made up of two buildings, each housing a restaurant, art gallery, event hall and a set of guest rooms. The furnishing and interiors of the restaurant consists mainly of artistic and rustic ornament and furniture, including chairs, cushioned benches, sofas, tables and stools with heavy sculptures of African reliefs and patterns and made from a mix of raw timber, straw, jute, rocks and leather materials sourced from within the country. There are also bars, an art gallery and corners for live jazz bands, poetry nights and open hall for other events within the restaurants building.
