= Ikeja Bus Terminal =

Bus terminal in Lagos, Nigeria

Ikeja Bus Terminal is located at Ikeja, the capital city of Lagos State. The bus terminal is located on the road to the local airport behind the present railway line in the city, and adjacent the state teaching hospital, ikeja general post office, all in the Computer Village neighbourhood.

The facility is sitting on a 10,000 square metres (110,000 ft^{2}) land space equipped with Intelligent Transport system (ITS), fully air-conditioned terminal, food courts, shops, ATM gallery, free WiFi, electronically controlled shades among others. According to reports, The Ikeja Bus terminal also has a large landmass for buses to park and load, large walk way for passengers, street lightning, rest rooms, control tower to monitor activities and greening with adequate exits.

The bus terminal was commissioned by President Muhammad Buhari GCFR on 29 March 2018. In attendance were many other dignitaries starting from the Incumbent governor of the state Governor Ambode, former governor of the state Bola Ahmed Tinubu among others.

The government of Lagos state has committed to making the transport system of the metropolitan capital city with an estimated population of about twenty million inhabitants to be more organized and orderly.
