= Oshodi Bus Terminal =

Bus station in Lagos, Nigeria

Oshodi Transport Interchange
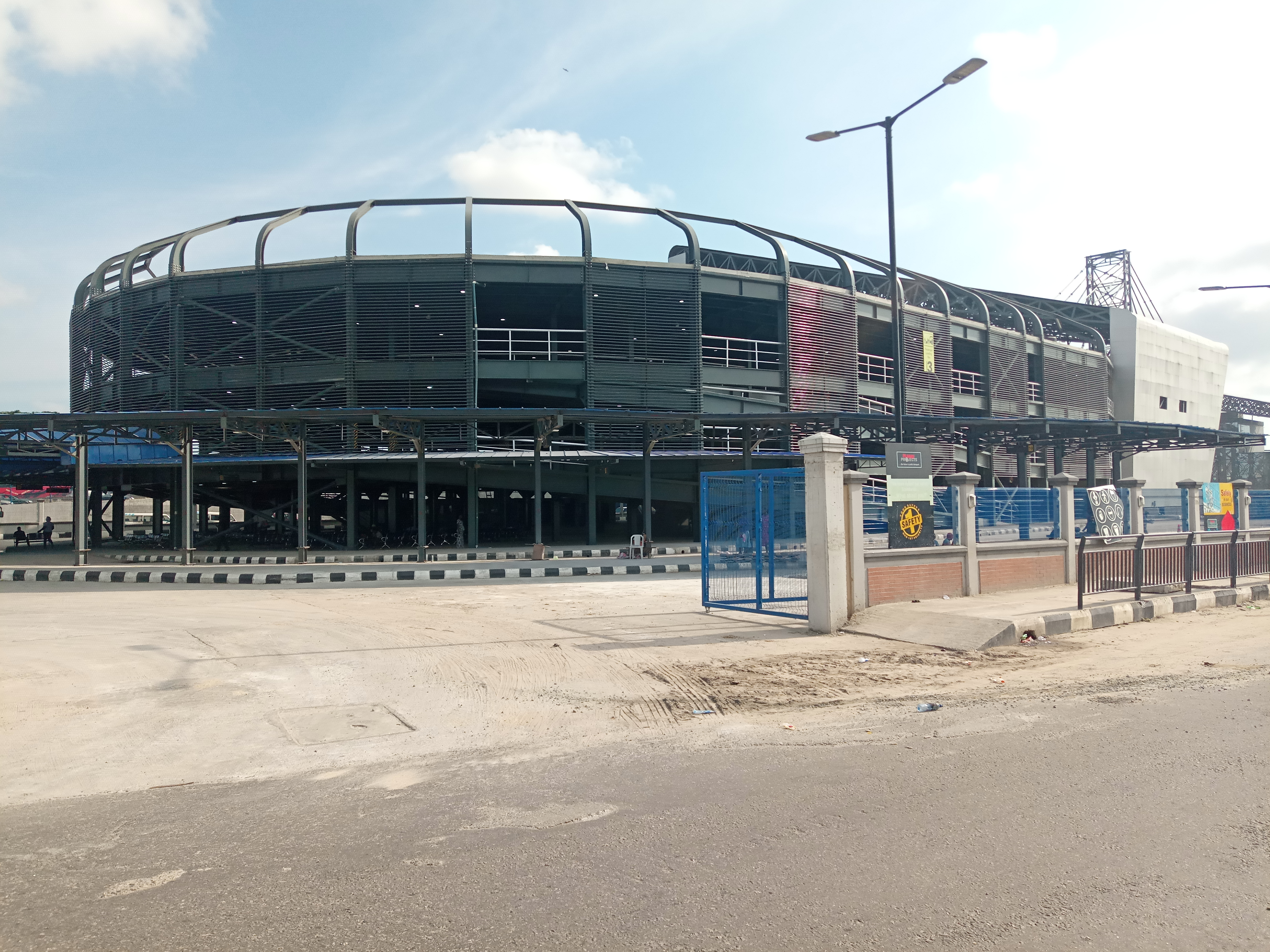
- Commenced operation: May 2019

Oshodi Transport Interchange is located in the Oshodi area of Lagos State, Nigeria. The bus terminal is located between the Lagos-Apapa Expressway and the Agege Motor Road. The Oshodi Bus Terminal is divided into three different terminals called: Terminal 1, Terminal 2, and Terminal 3.

== Construction ==
The Oshodi Bus Terminal was constructed by a construction firm called Planet Projects Limited. The construction of the terminal was estimated to cost about $70 million. The terminal was constructed to accommodate about 820 mass transit buses.

== Terminals and facilities ==
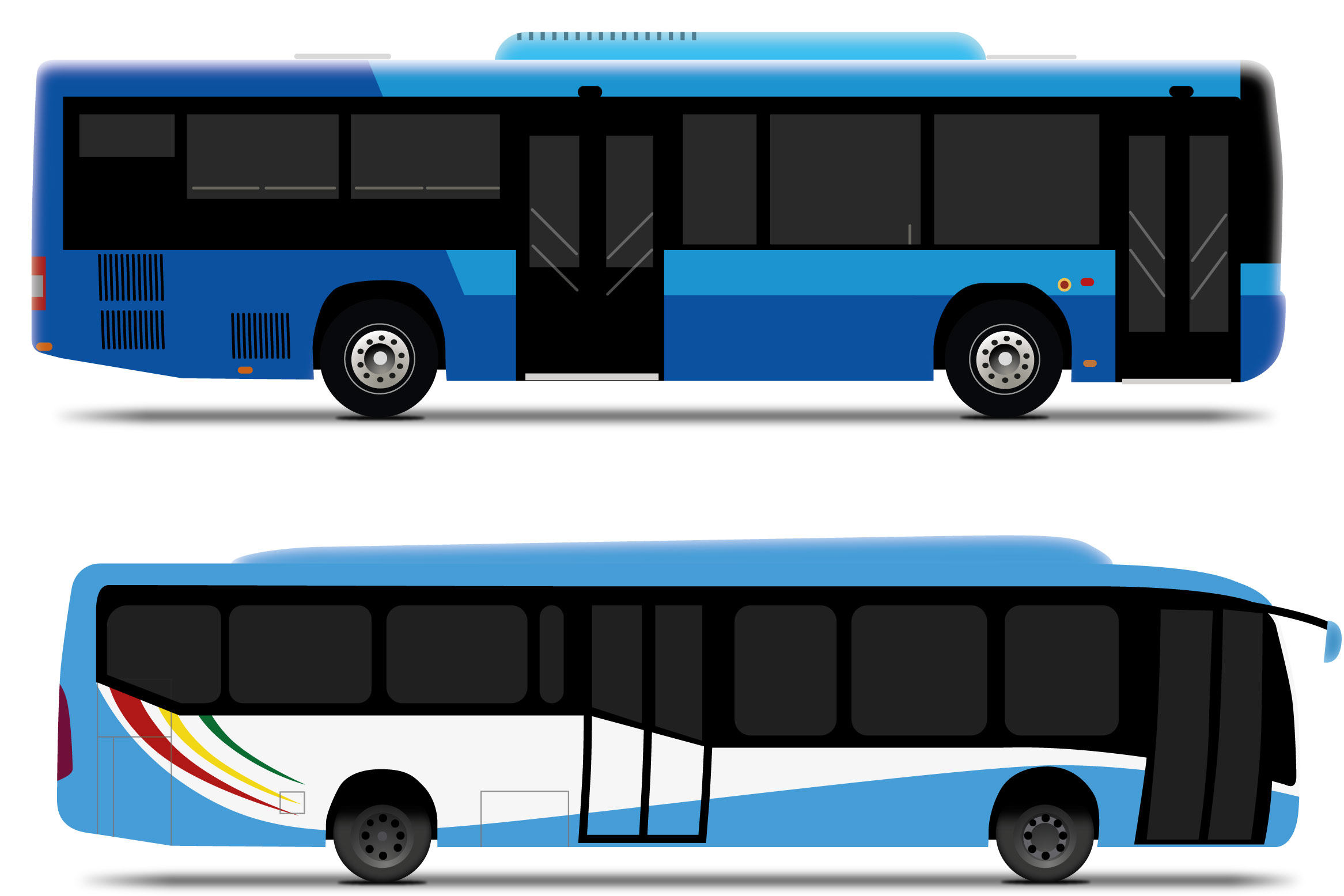
BRT bus (above) and LBSL bus (beneath)

The Oshodi bus terminal is divided into three terminals called: Terminal 1, Terminal 2, and Terminal 3. Each of the bus terminals consists of 30000 square meters and includes a lot of facilities which includes: loading bays, ticketing stands, driver lounge, parking areas, restrooms and many others. The Oshodi Bus Terminal started operation in May 2019 as announced by the contractor handling the project. Terminal 1 is for interstate transportation, and it was designed for destinations spanning the SouthWest, SouthEast, FCT, and Northern states. Terminal two is for intercity routes. Ikeja, Agege, Iyana Ipaja, Egbeda, Abule Egba etc. Terminal 3 takes routes such as Mile 2/Festac, Airport Road, Bariga/New Garage, Tincan, Orile, Apapa/Wharf, Ejigbo, Ajegunle/Boundary, Ojodu/Berger, Gbagada/Anthony, Eko Ijumota, Iyana Isolo/Jakande Gate/ Itire, Ojota/Ketu/Mile 12, Adeniji, Eko Hotel.

== Commissioning ==
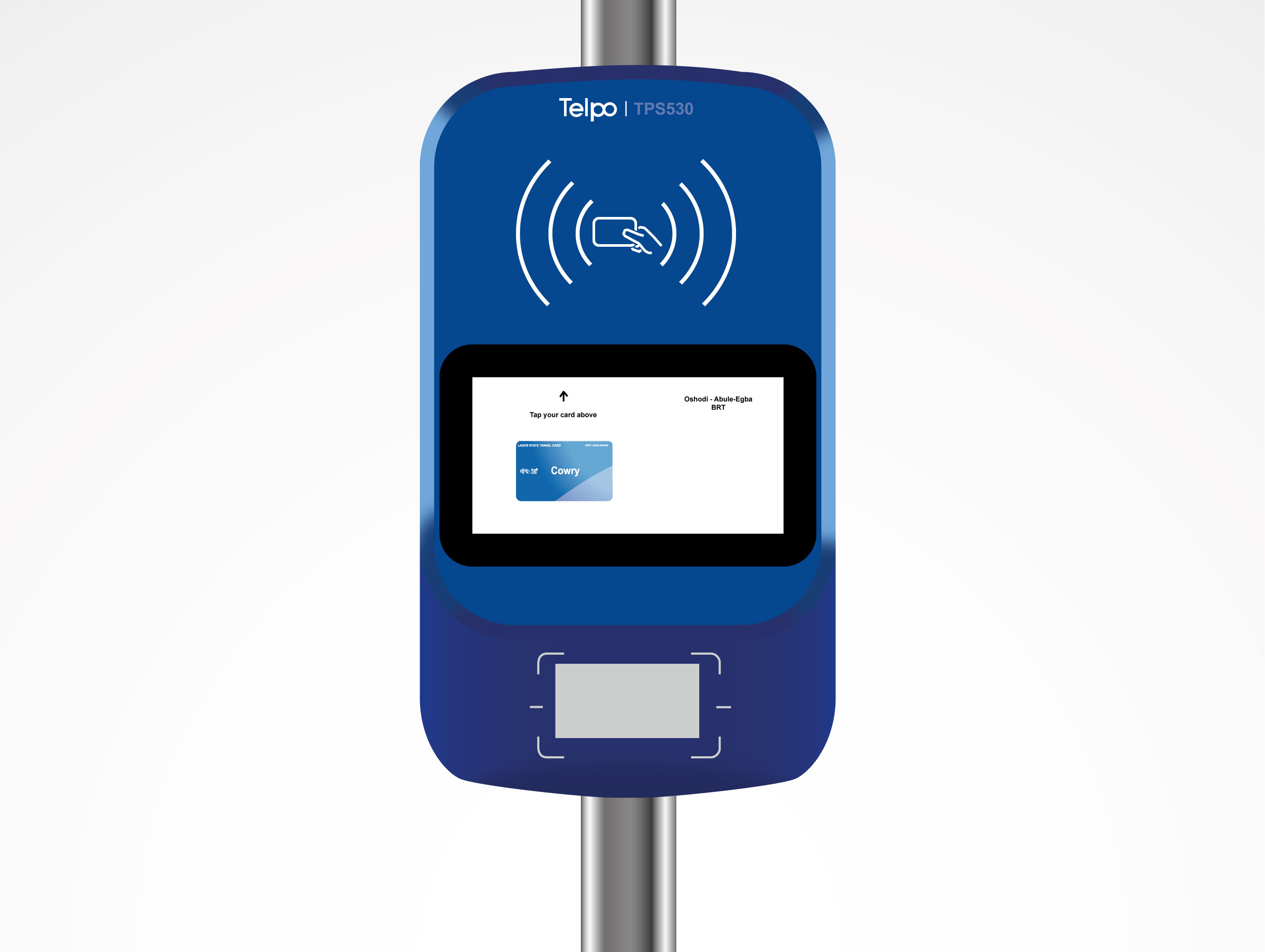
Terminal for public transportation cards

The Oshodi Bus Terminal was commissioned by President Muhammadu Buhari on 24 April 2019, also present for the commissioning was the Ex-Governor of Lagos state, Akinwunmi Ambode, Present Governor, Babajide Sanwoolu, Abiola Ajimobi, Ibikunle Amosun and others.

== Lagos Red Line ==
To increase the connectivity of different parts of Lagos the Lagos Red Line was constructed. The Red Line is a 37km North – South rail route proposed to run from Agbado to Ebute Metta with eight proposed stations at Agbado, Iju, Agege, Ikeja, Oshodi, Mushin, Yaba, Ebute Metta. The Oshodi terminal 3 will serve as a transport interchange for both bus and train routes.

== Noteworthy ==
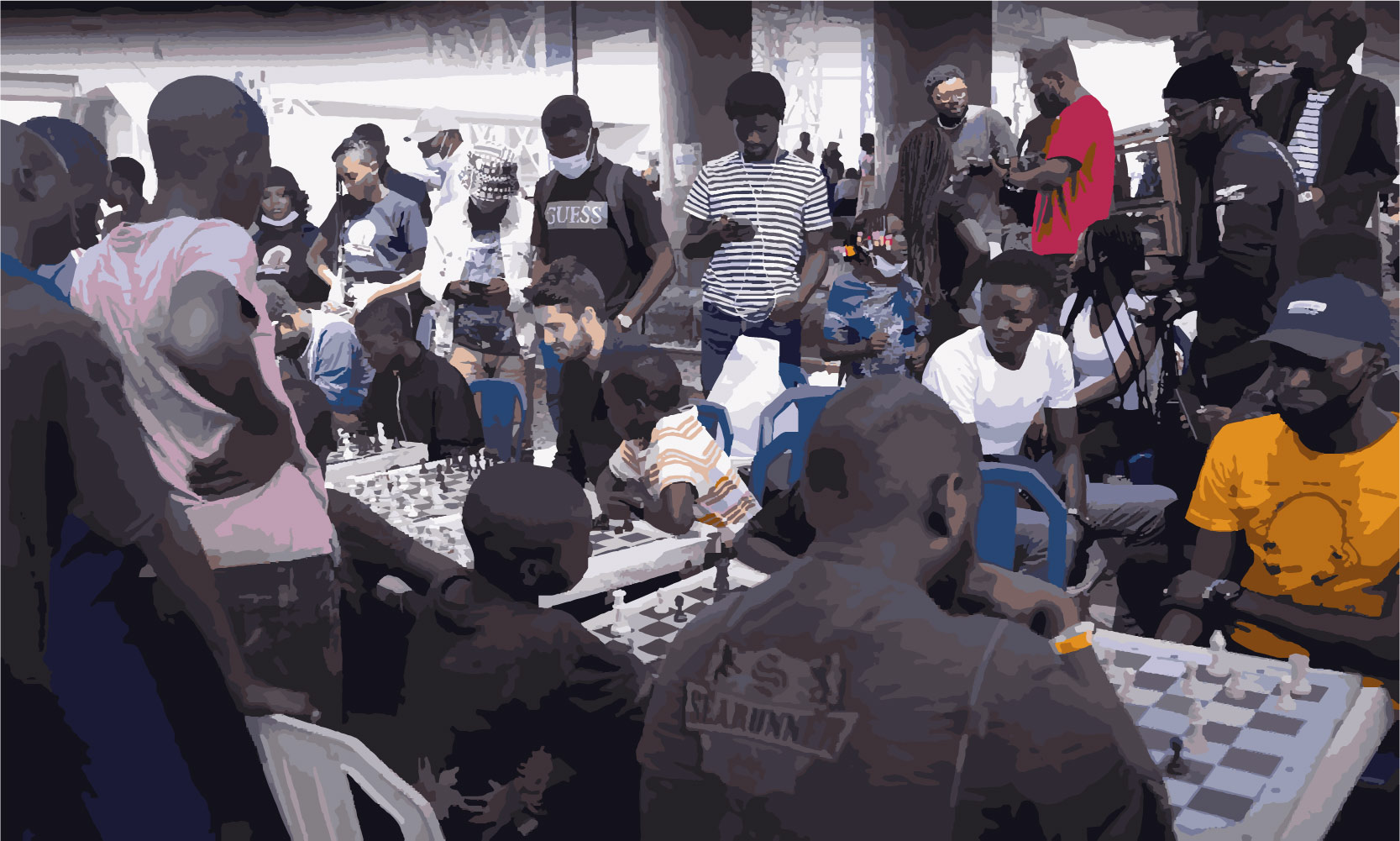
Chess scene at Oshodi

Along the rail tracks of Oshodi, young people from socially deprived areas play chess. In December 2021, 19-year-old homeless Fawaz Adeoye won the district's championship a few months after he was first introduced to the game.
