= Dolphin Estate, Ikoyi =

Gated community in Ikoyi, Lagos, Nigeria

Coordinates: 6.4556°N 3.4125°E

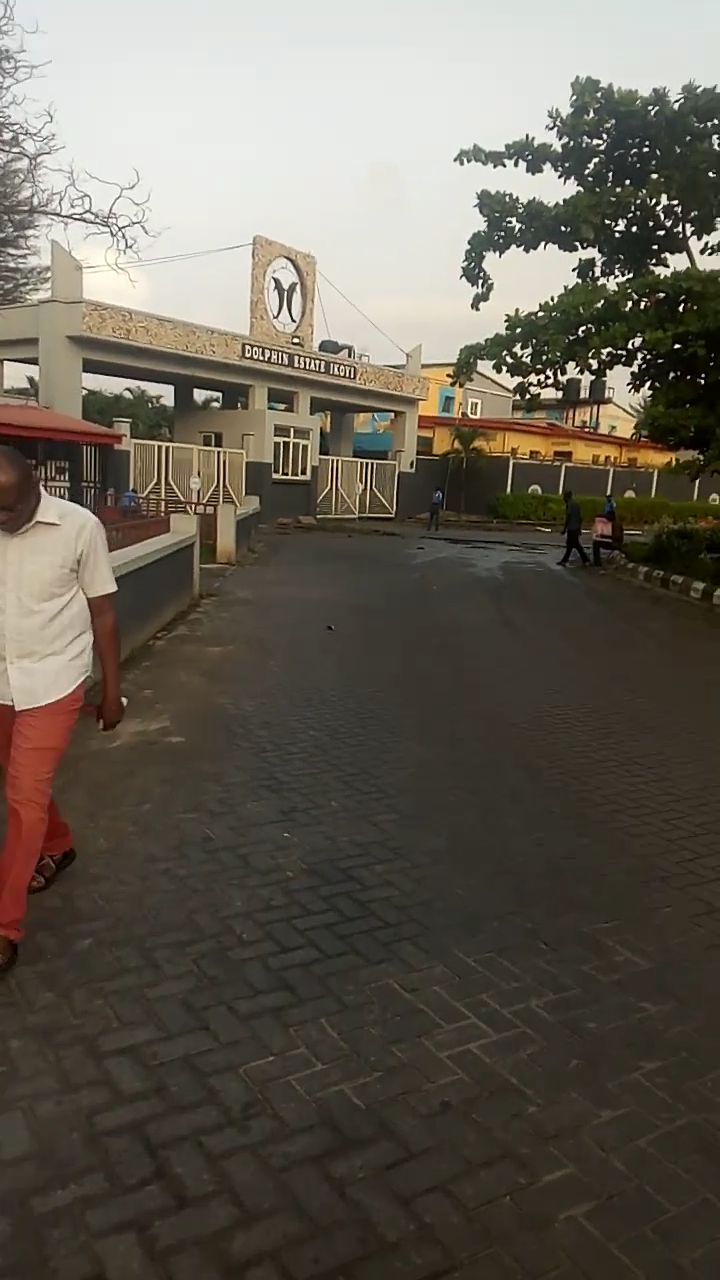
Dolphin Estate

Dolphin Estate is a gated community in Ikoyi, Lagos, Nigeria.

== History ==
The Dolphin Estate was one of Ikoyi's first gated communities. built by Messrs HFP Engineering Nigeria in 1990 for the Lagos State Development and Property Corporation, LSDPC. This was the completion of phase 1, which consisted of the construction of 646 units. Phase 2 of the project, also developed by Messrs HFP, consisted of the construction of 1458 units. The third phase added prefabricated high rise buildings on eight blocks of the Estate, initially to house those displaced by the construction work.

It is the estate where Funsho Williams, a popular PDP Lagos governorship aspirant, was murdered on 26 June 2006 at his residence on Corporation Drive.

In October 2015, 45 Boko Haram suspects were arrested after plotting to attack the estate, but later found to be a gas explosion.

In July 2017, the government asked all the owners of the properties illegally built on top of the drainage network to vacate their houses and move elsewhere, blaming their presence for the repetitive floods in the area, and engaged in the promised destructions of illegal properties the same month. In September 2018, a major flood hit the Dolphin Estate, and again in October 2019. The drainage system could not release all the captured water into ocean all at once, causing it to remain in the Ikoyi area and rise.

== Description ==
The estate is home to middle-class and high-income residential areas. There is a police station within the Estate. The Honorary Consulate of Mexico is also located in the Dolphin Estate. It is considered one of the most expensive places to live in Lagos.

The structures built in the 1990s are starting to wear off, and the high rise area turned into a low-income area with a poor drainage system and security issues. There is an artificial canal running across the Estate but it is clogged.

The estate hosts several hotels like Oakwood Park Hotel, Casa Hawa-Safe Court, Le Paris Continental Hotel and Pelican Intercontinental Hotel, and a shopping complex.

== See also ==
- Parkview Estate
