= Holy Child College =

Missionary school in Ikoyi, Lagos, Nigeria

- Ikoyi, Lagos, Lagos State; Nigeria

Information
- School type: Missionary High school
- Motto: Facta non Verba
- Religious affiliations: Roman Catholic, Christian
- Denomination: Catholic
- Established: 1945 (81 years ago)
- Administrator: Rev. Sister Christiana Olagunju
- Gender: All-girls
- Website: holychildcollegeswikoyi.org

Holy Child College is a Catholic secondary school for girls in Lagos, Nigeria. It was set up on 9 April 1945 by the Society of the Holy Child Jesus (SHCJ) and run by the Roman Catholic Archdiocese of Lagos. It is located in South-West Ikoyi on the cusp of Obalende and Keffi; next to its brother school St Gregory's College, Lagos. Holy Child College consists of three years of Junior Secondary School (JSS) and three years of Senior Secondary School (SSS) as part of the 6-3-3-4 educational system in Nigeria, and the West African Senior School Certificate Examinations, allowing eligibility for graduation.

== History ==
The Reverend Sisters of the Society of the Holy Child Jesus came to Africa in 1930 with their first school being set up in Calabar. The Society founded Holy Child College, Lagos in 1945 at the invitation of Archbishop Leo Taylor, who wanted a good Catholic secondary school for the girls in his archdiocese.

The school started on the 9 April 1945 with two classes of 15 girls each and four nuns as full-time teachers. To increase the number of students, a new class was admitted each year. By the time the foundation set had completed the six-year programme, the student population had increased from 30 to 200 in 1950. The foundation students mostly came from ' Popo Aguda '(meaning Catholic Lagosians in Yoruba), who were Brazilian returnees and old Lagos families such as the Trezises, Da Rocha, Vera Cruz, Pereira, Soares and Pedro, as well as other prominent Nigerian families such as Apena, Akran, Alakija, Nwosu and Okoli.

Holy Child College offers an all-round academic education as well as Sports, Oratory Skills, Latin, Art and Drama, Etiquette and Deportment. Everything in the College is done Ad Majorem Dei Gloria - to the Glory of God.

== Principals and administrators ==
- 1945-1956 - Rev. Mother Mary Magdalene.
- 1956-1960 - Mother Marcella (Sr. Helena Brennan).
- 1960-1967 - Mother Thomasine (Sr. Margaret Mary Michael).
- 1967-1970 - Mother Carmel (Sr. Angela Crotty).
- 1970-1972 - Sr. Ellinor Callahan.
- 1972-1973 - Sr. Clarita Hanson.
- 1973-1985 - Mrs Margaret Sosan.
- 1986-1987 - Mrs R.A. Majasan.
- 1987-1990 - Mrs E. Aworinde.
- 1990-1992 - Mrs F. Awolaja.
- 1992-1994 - Mrs O.O. Olagbemi.
- 1994-1999 - Mrs E.N. Ogundimu.
- 1999-2001 - Mrs A.T. Oyemade.
- 2001-2012 - Rev. Sr. Sophia Onuorah (SHCJ).
- 2012-2017 - Rev. Sr. Ify Rosemary Atuegbu.
- 2017-2020 - Rev. Sr. Antoinette Opara

== Alumni ==
- Joke Silva, Nigerian actress, director, and businesswoman
- Margaret Dada Marquis (1944- 2022) †, Recognized as one of Nigeria’s pioneer female architects
- Toki Mabogunje, The third female president of Lagos Chamber of Commerce and Industry
- Francesca Yetunde Emanuel, Public Servant
- Julie Coker, Journalist
- Tomi Somefun, CEO of Unity Bank plc
- Yvonne Ekwere, Media personality
- Sokari Ekine, photographer, blogger, educationalist
- Yewande Akinse is a Nigerian Poet, Author and Entrepreneur

- Bimbo Odukoya,(1960-2005) Pastor, writer, co-founder of Fountain of life church, Singles and Married Ministry.
