= St Gregory's College, Lagos =

St. Gregory's College
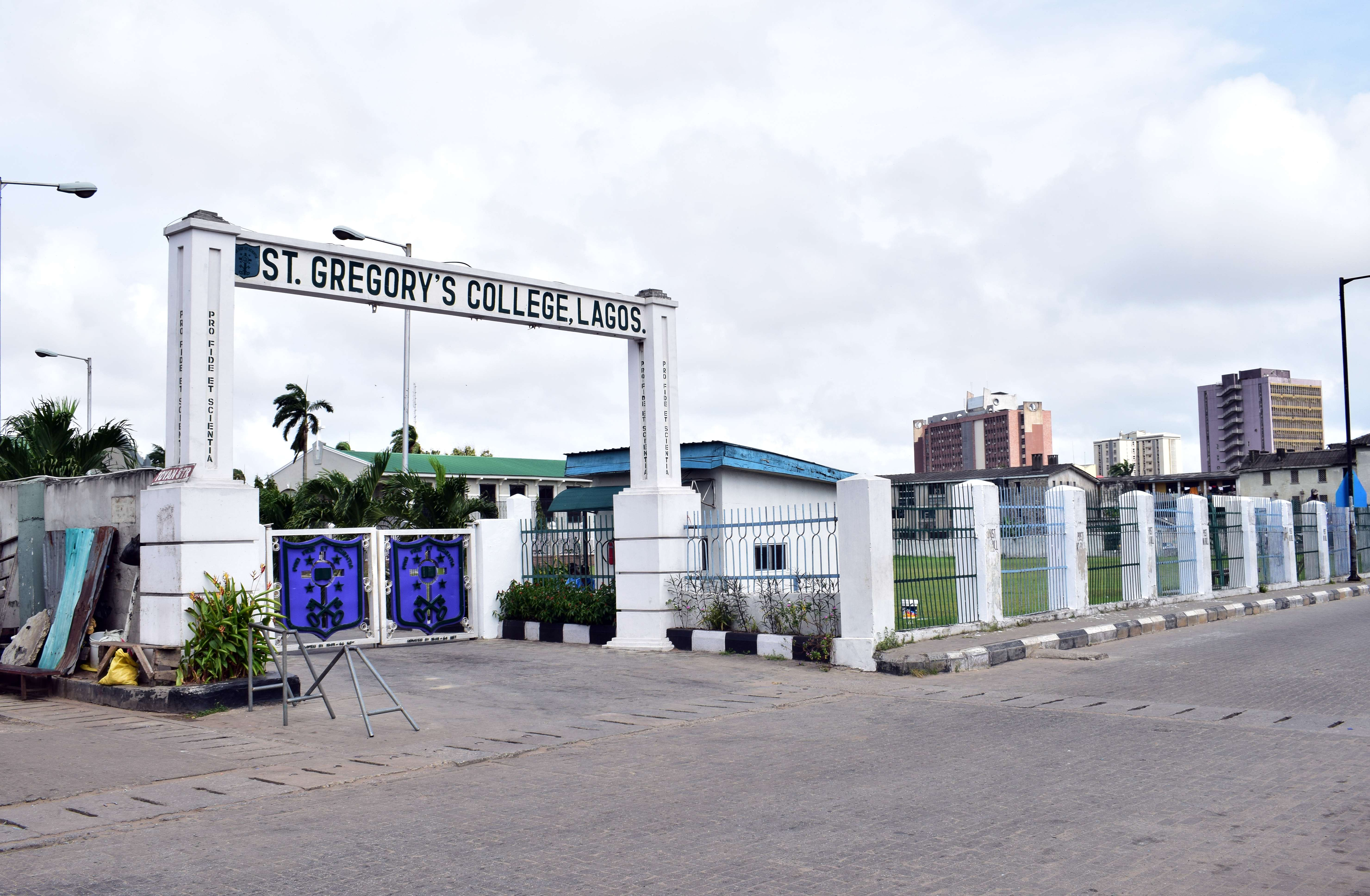
- South West Ikoyi Lagos; Ikoyi, Lagos, Lagos State; Nigeria

Information
- School type: Missionary High school
- Motto: Pro Fide Et Scientia
- Religious affiliations: Roman Catholic, Christian
- Denomination: Catholic
- Established: 1928 (98 years ago)
- Founder: Catholic Mission
- Sister school: Holy Child College Obalende
- Administrator: Reverend Father Emmanuel Ayeni
- Grades: 7–12
- Gender: Male (Formerly mixed gender)
- Houses: St Augustine, St Peter, St Francis, St Benedict
- Colours: Green, Purple,
- Slogan: Up Gregs
- Nickname: Gregs
- Endowment: Endowment, Perpetual and Infrastructure Development Fund
- Website: stgregoryscollege.ng

St. Gregory's College, Lagos, is a Catholic Boys' School with boarding facilities, located 1.0 km from Tafawa Balewa Square in the vicinity of Ikoyi – Obalende, Lagos State, Nigeria.

== History ==
The college, originally a mixed-gender education campus before the creation of its sister school Holy Child College, Obalende, is based in South-West Ikoyi. It was established through the Catholic mission in 1928 and named after Pope Gregory the Great (540–604). Michael Ibru and his construction outfit, Ace Jomona, took part in the building of the school at that time.

In the late 1990s, during the encouragement of internet use by innovators and governing bodies, a class of 1997 alumni and early advocate technologist Ade A. Olufeko, built the college's first and most recognisable online presence using Web design in the year 1998, based on the need to assist alumni connect with each other globally. Subsequently, as the city of Lagos embraced the digital economy, alumni from different graduating sets and the school's administration eventually established an official website in 2018.

== Athletics ==
Saint Gregory's most notable sports teams have been its cricket and football squads.

== Principals and administrators ==
- 1928-1934 Archbishop Leo Hale Taylor.
- 1934-1937 James Saul.
- 1938-1942 Francis Bunyan.
- 1943-1957 T.J. Moran.
- 1957-1959 T.J. MacAndrew.
- 1960-1969 James MacCarthy.
- 1969-1972 Francis McGovern.
- 1972-1977 Paul Amenechi.
- 1977-1992 Anthony Omoera.
- 1992-1993 Anthony Bolawa.
- 1994-1999 C.B. Adekoya.
- 2000-2001 M.A. Salami.
- 2001-2014 Edmund Akpala
- 2015-present Emmanuel Ayeni.

== Endowment and development ==
In September 2026 the St. Gregory's College Old Boys' Association (SGCOBA) established an Endowment, Perpetual and Infrastructure Development Fund in order to give long-term financial assistance to the college. The fund is meant to provide support for scholarships, infrastructure, educational programmes, staff development, technology and other strategic initiatives. The governance structure which has been proposed includes a board of trustees, external fund managers and external auditors.

== Notable alumni ==
- Adetokunbo Ademola, Chief Justice of the Supreme Court of Nigeria
- Jab Adu, actor and director
- Jimi Agbaje, pharmacist and politician
- Ben Murray-Bruce, business magnate and politician
- Sir Adeyemo Alakija KBE, lawyer, politician and businessman
- Yemi Cardoso, Governor of the Central Bank of Nigeria
- Ade A. Olufeko, technologist, designer and entrepreneur
- Tunji Disu, the 23rd Inspector General of Police of Nigeria
- Ganiyu Dawodu, politician and activist
- Oba C. D. Akran, Traditional titleholder of Badagry; politician
- Antonio Deinde Fernandez, business magnate and diplomat
- Adewale Maja-Pearce, writer, journalist and critic
- J. M. Johnson, politician
- Jibril Martin, lawyer
- Olufemi Majekodunmi, British-Nigerian architect
- Raymond Njoku, Nigerian politician and former minister for Transport
- Mike Omoighe, artist and critic
- Segun Agbaje, Banker; executive of GTBank
- Cardinal Anthony Olubunmi Okogie, Archbishop of Lagos
- Victor Uwaifo, musician
- Funsho Williams, politician
- Lamidi Adeyemi III, Alaafin of Oyo
- Chief Ayo Gabriel Irikefe, former Chief Justice of Nigeria
- Denrele Edun, television presenter
- Patrick Ekeji, sports administrator
- Tayo Aderinokun, entrepreneur; former CEO of Guaranty Trust Bank
- Obafemi Lasode, film actor
- Nonso Amadi, Afro-Fusion Singer/Songwriter
- Vector, hip-hop artist
- Moses Majekodunmi, Nigerian gynaecologist and obstetrician; Minister of Health in the Nigerian First Republic
- Tomi Davies, entrepreneur and philanthropist
- Gbenga Shobo, business executive
- Rafiu Oluwa, athlete, sprinter
- Segun Gele, fashion designer, head-tie stylist
- Bode Rhodes-Vivour, Justice of the Supreme Court of Nigeria
- Shola Akinlade, software engineer & CEO of Paystack
- Vincent Babatunde Chukumeka Nwuga, Professor of physiotherapy
- VBEZ, R&B Singer, Record Producer and Music Executive

== See also ==
- Education in Nigeria
- List of schools in Lagos
