= Oba C. D. Akran =

Nigerian politician (1899–?)

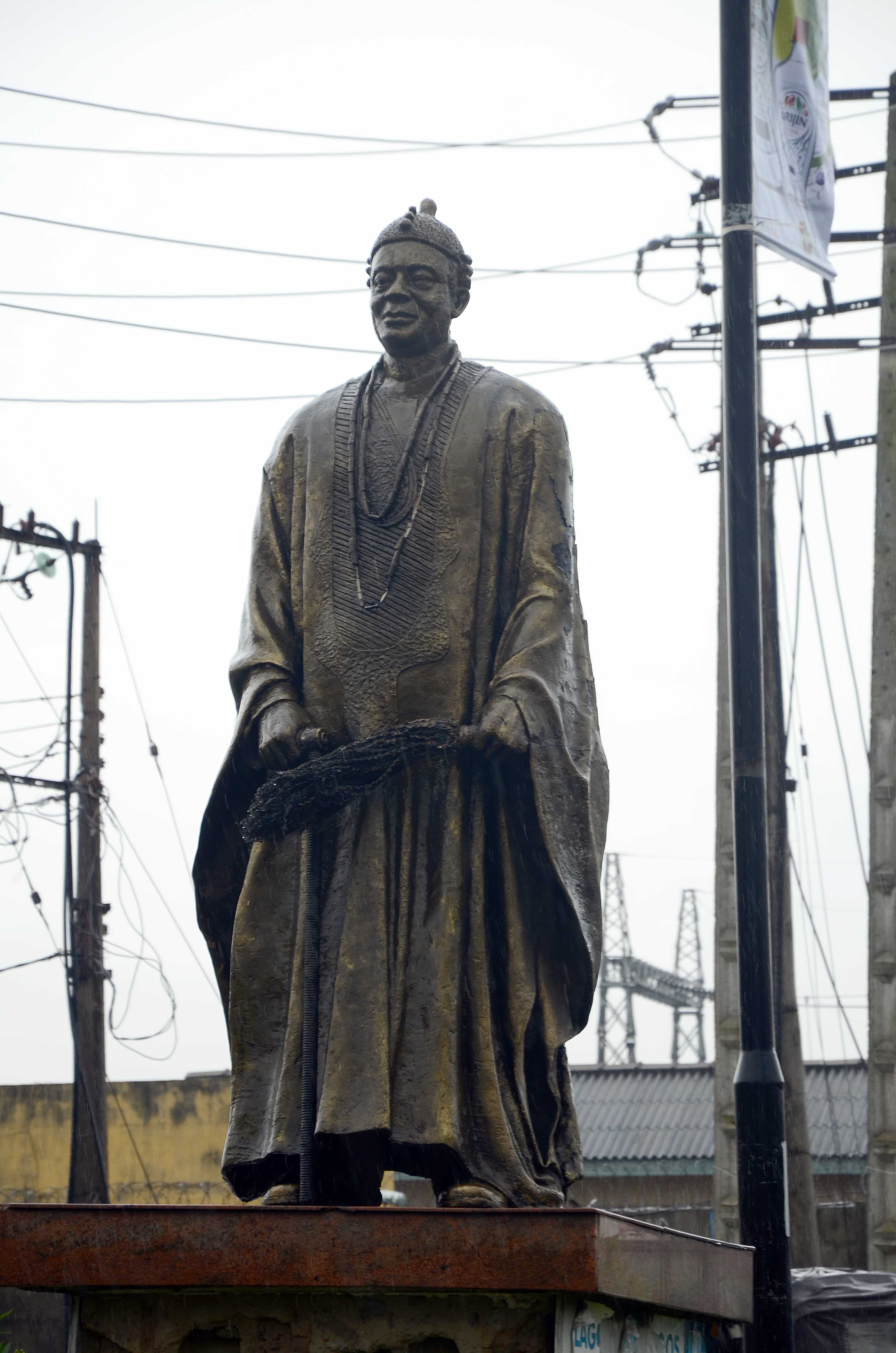
Statue of Oba Akran in Agege

Oba Claudius Dosa Akran was a Nigerian politician and Ogu king who represented Badagry in parliament in 1951 and held the title of Aholu Jiwa II of Jegba. He was a member of the Action Group during the pre-independence period and was appointed regional Minister of Local Government and Economic Planning in 1952. He was an influential member of the party and was regional Minister of Finance from 1962 to 1966.

== Biography ==
Akran was born in 1899 in the family of Kopon, who acted as head of Jegba quarters of Badagry. At the behest of a Catholic priest, he was permitted by his father to attend school. Akran attended St Gregory's College, Obalende and finished secondary education at King's College.

He influenced the establishment of Badagry Grammar School in 1955, the first secondary school in Badagry and other infrastructural development in Badagry such as post and telegraph, electrical and road facilities.
