= Alfred Rewane Gardens =

Public green space in Lagos, Nigeria

Coordinates: 6°27′25.55″N 3°25′54.49″E

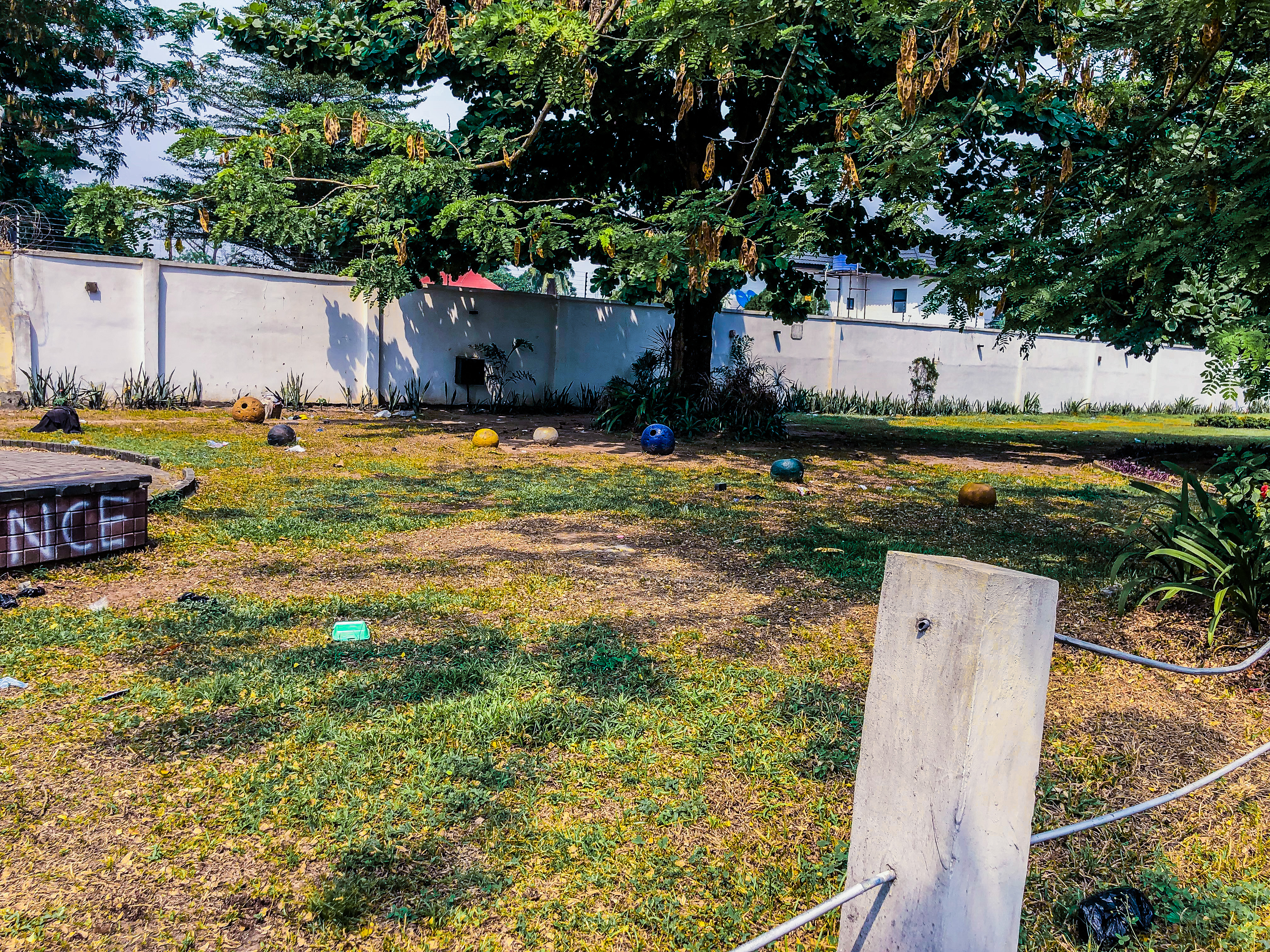
Alfred Rewane Garden

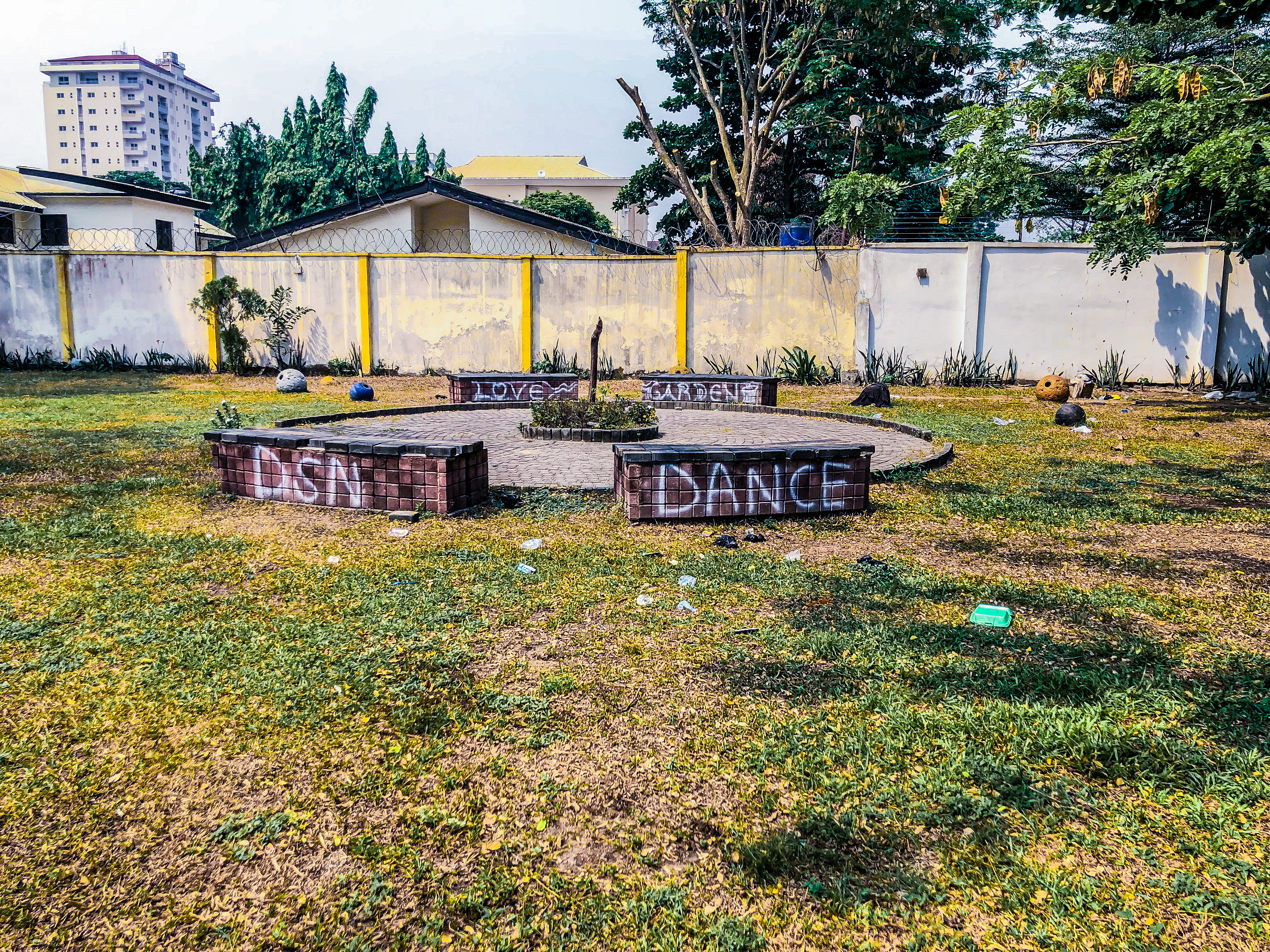
Alfred Rewane Green Space

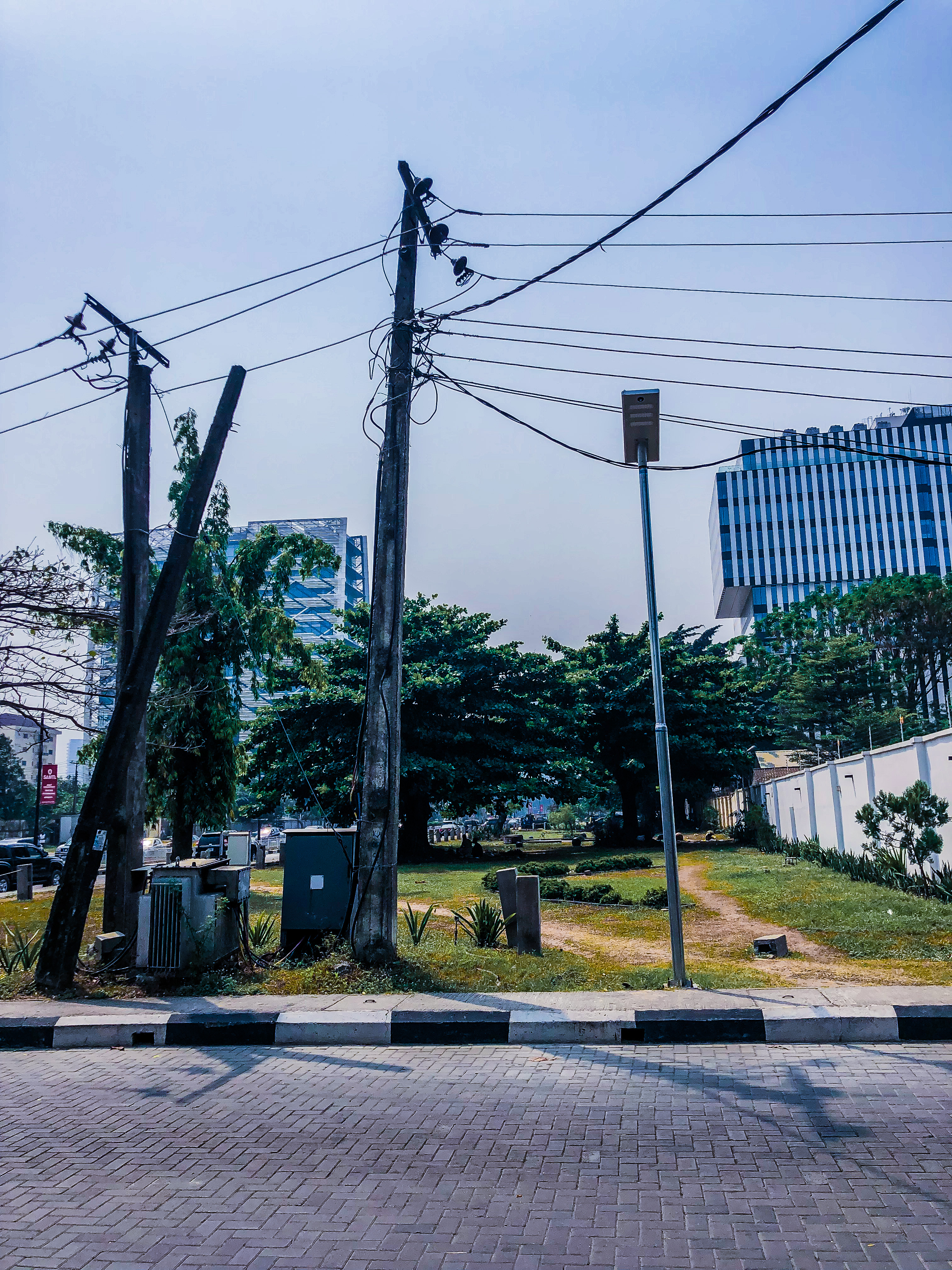
Alfred Rewane Green Space

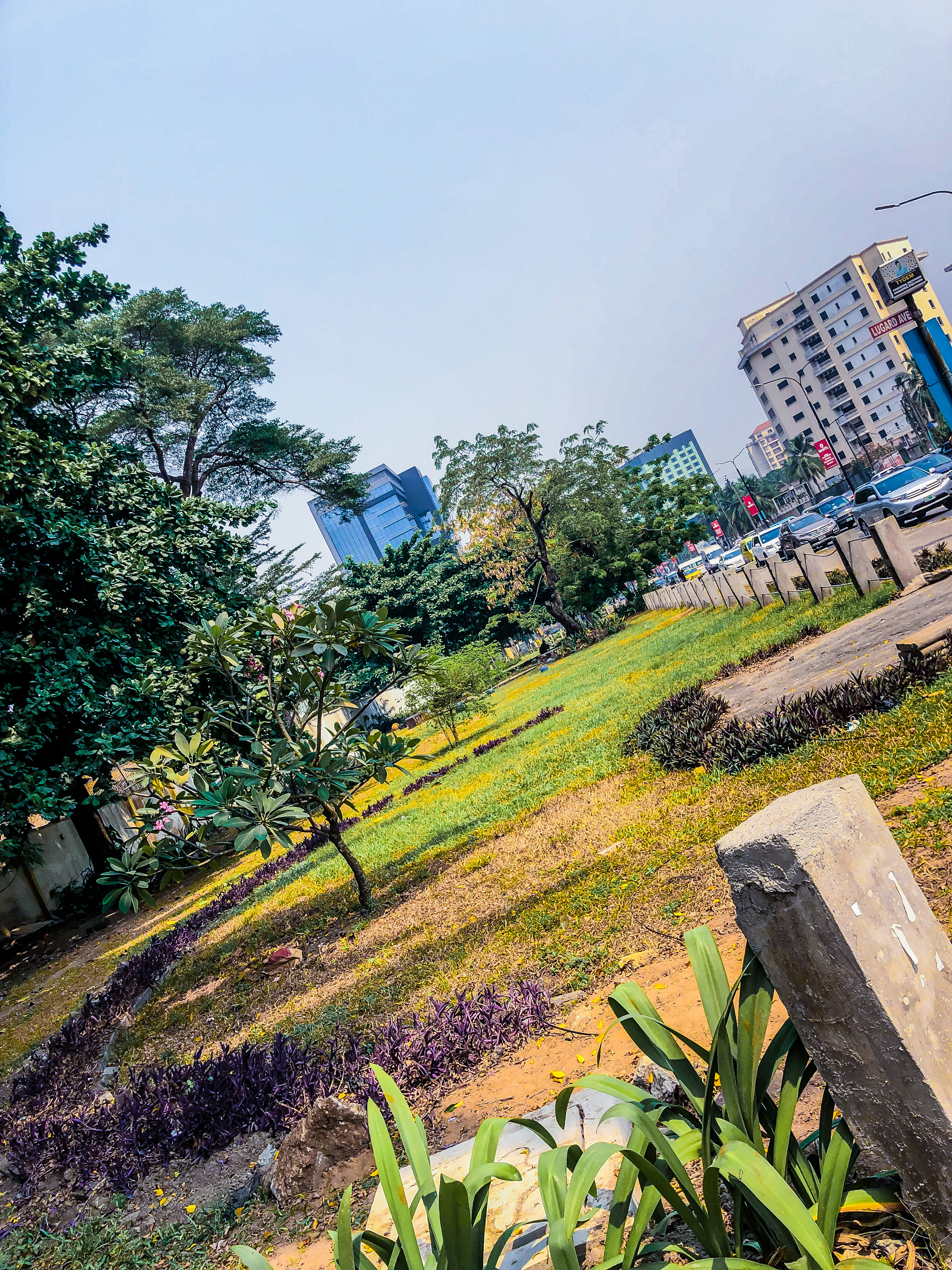
Alfred Rewane Green Space

The Alfred Rewane Gardens is a public green space along the Alfred Rewane Road in Ikoyi in Lagos. The garden which was developed by the Lagos State Government in 2018 sits on a land size of 9,174 m^{2} (14,220,000 in^{2}) from Osborne junction through Lugard Avenue to NNPC and was named after the Nigerian business man who died October 6, 1995. The park is open for the residents within and around the radius of the garden to relax, and have a view of the busy Alfred Rewane Road.

== Gallery ==
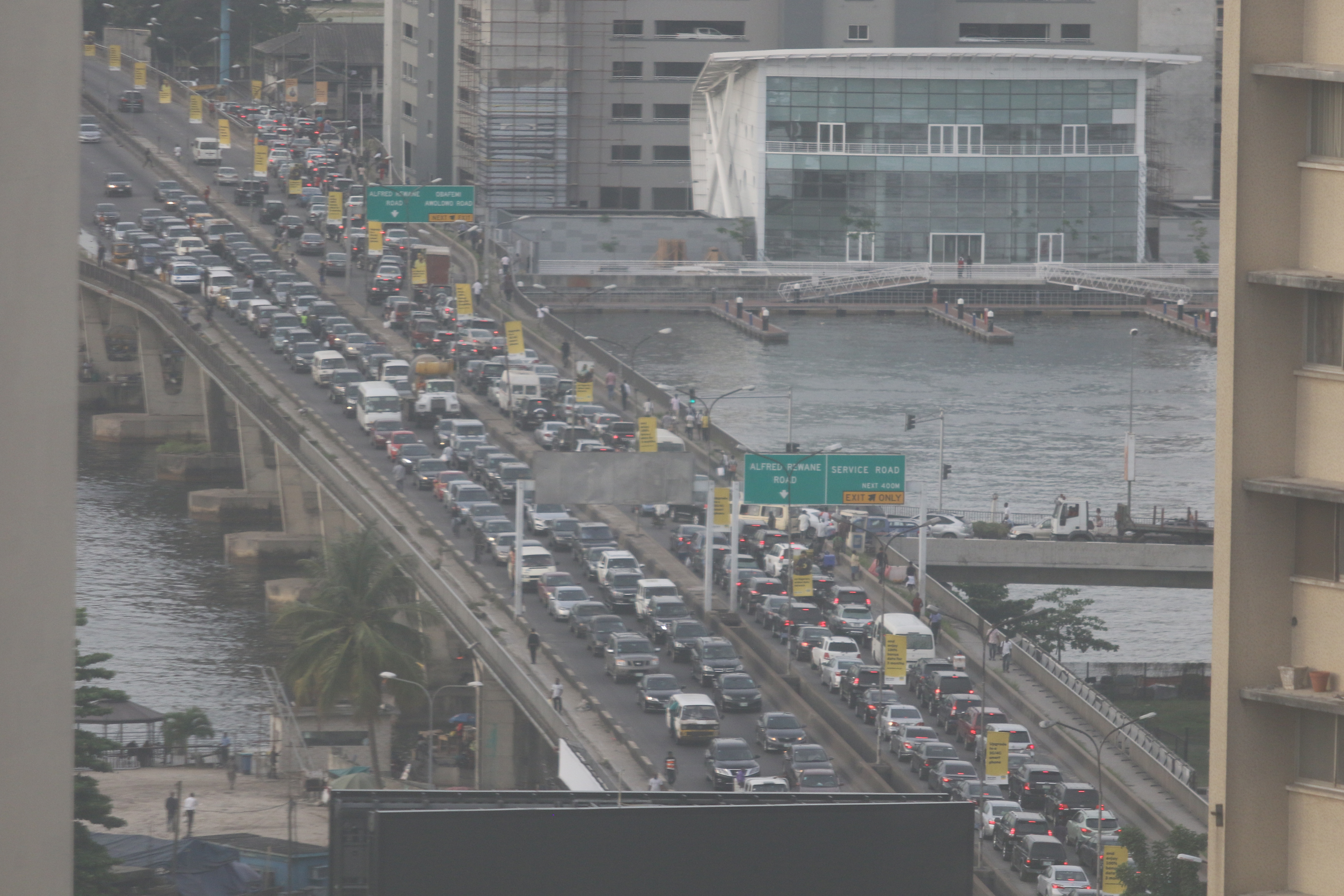

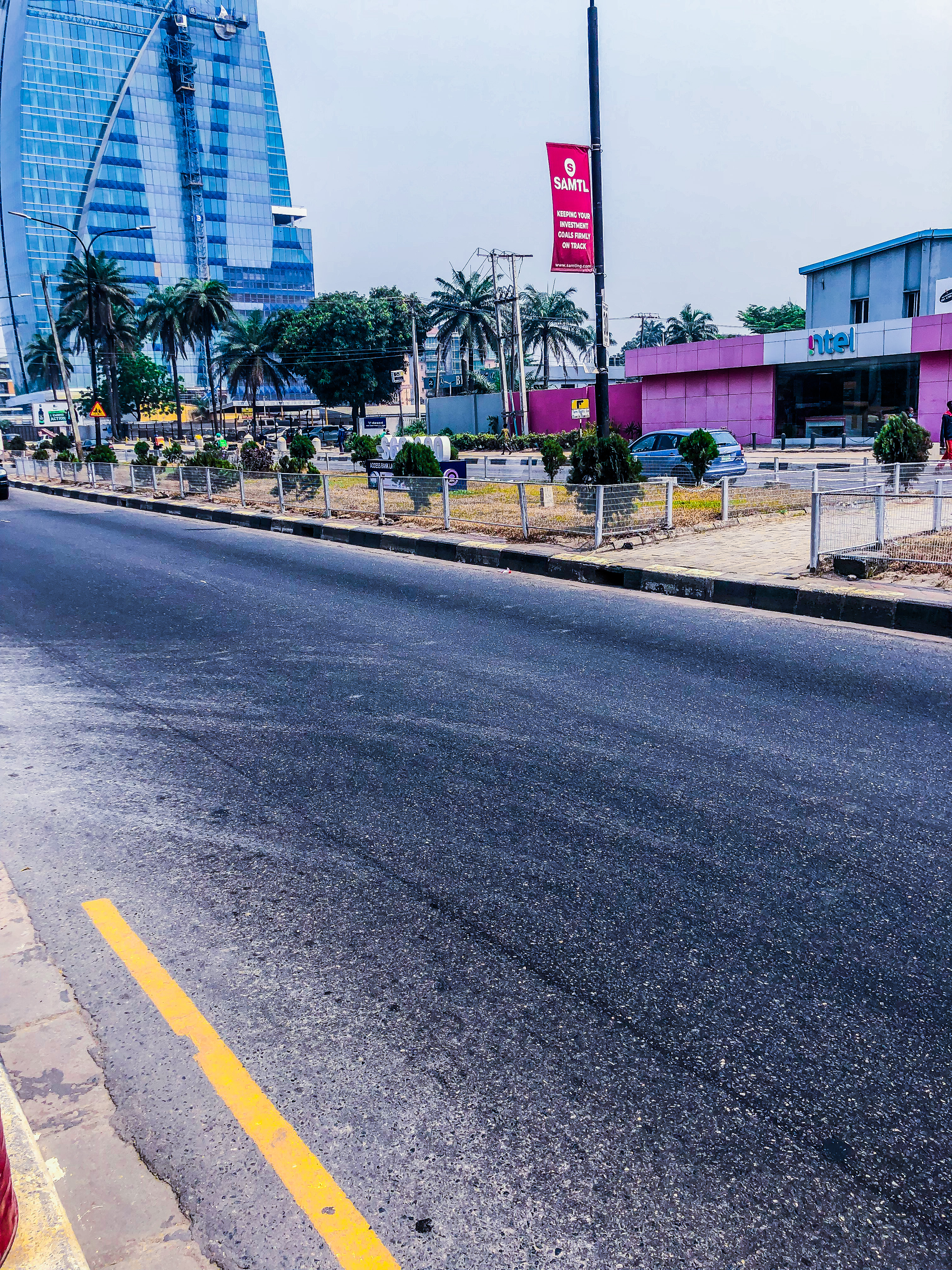

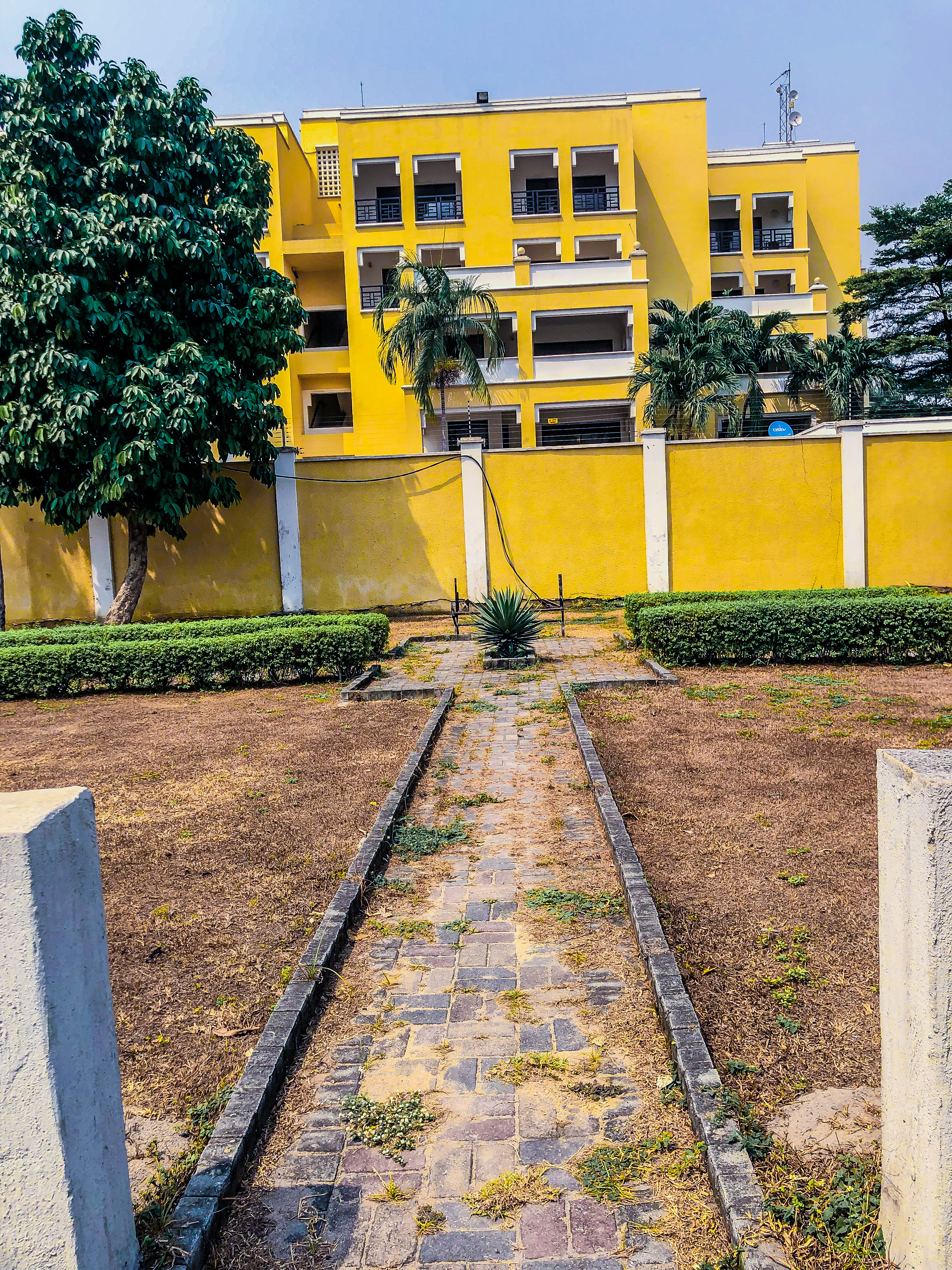
