= Olubi =

Olubi is a surname. It can also be a middle name. Notable people with this surname include:

- John Olubi Sodipo (1935 – 1999), a Nigerian philosopher
- Ezra Olubi (born 1986), a Nigerian tech entrepreneur
- Toby Olubi (born 1987), a British bobsledder
- Segun Olubi (born 1999), an American football player
