= The Garden Ikoyi =

The Garden, Ikoyi is an urban green space located along Alfred Rewane Road, Ikoyi, Lagos. This garden was unveiled in November 2022 and is maintained by RF Gardens. The garden has seats, an outdoor space for minimal recreation, small gatherings, sales of victuals, an indoor lounge, and an office complex.

== Gallery ==
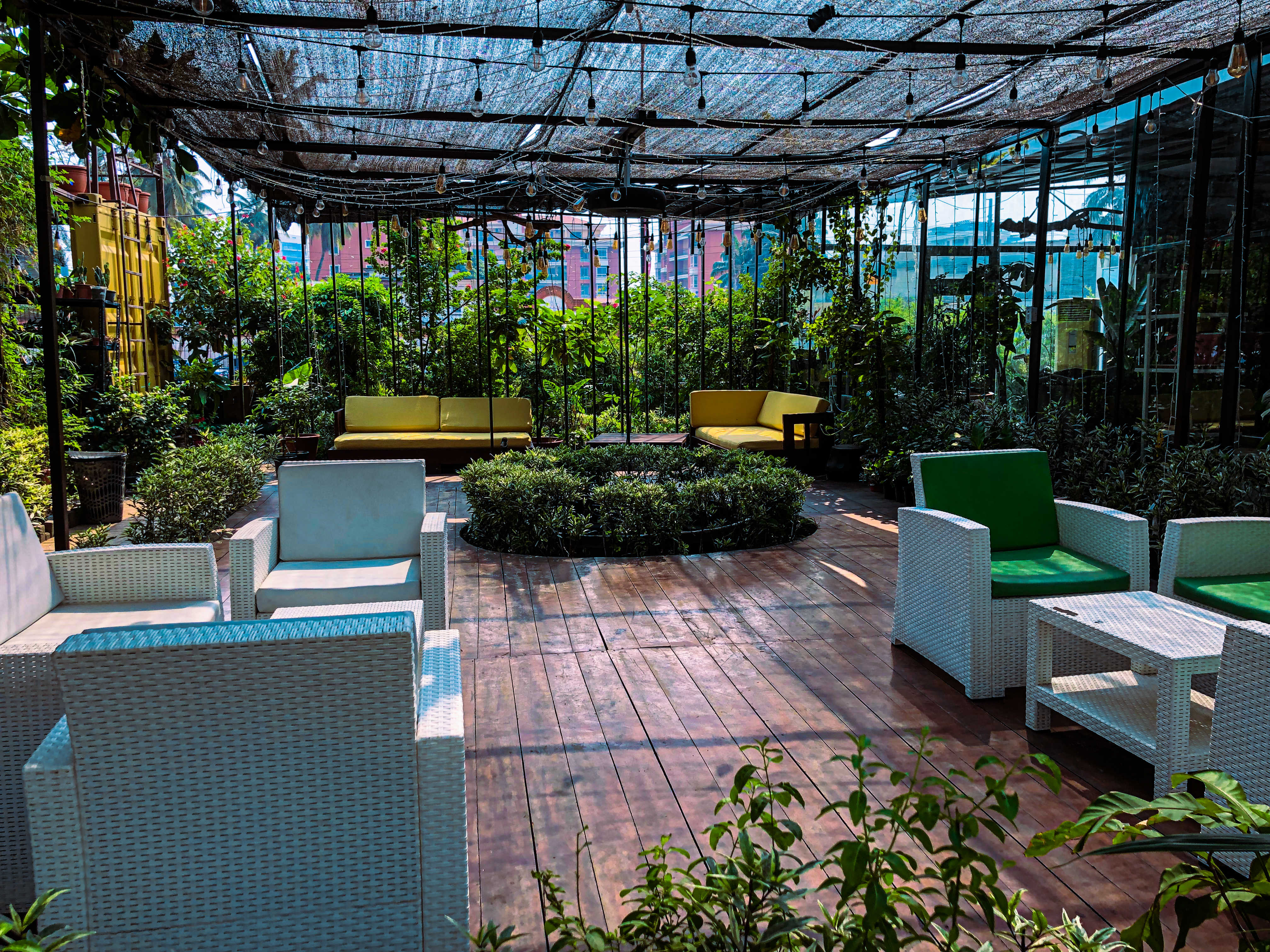
The Garden, Ikoyi

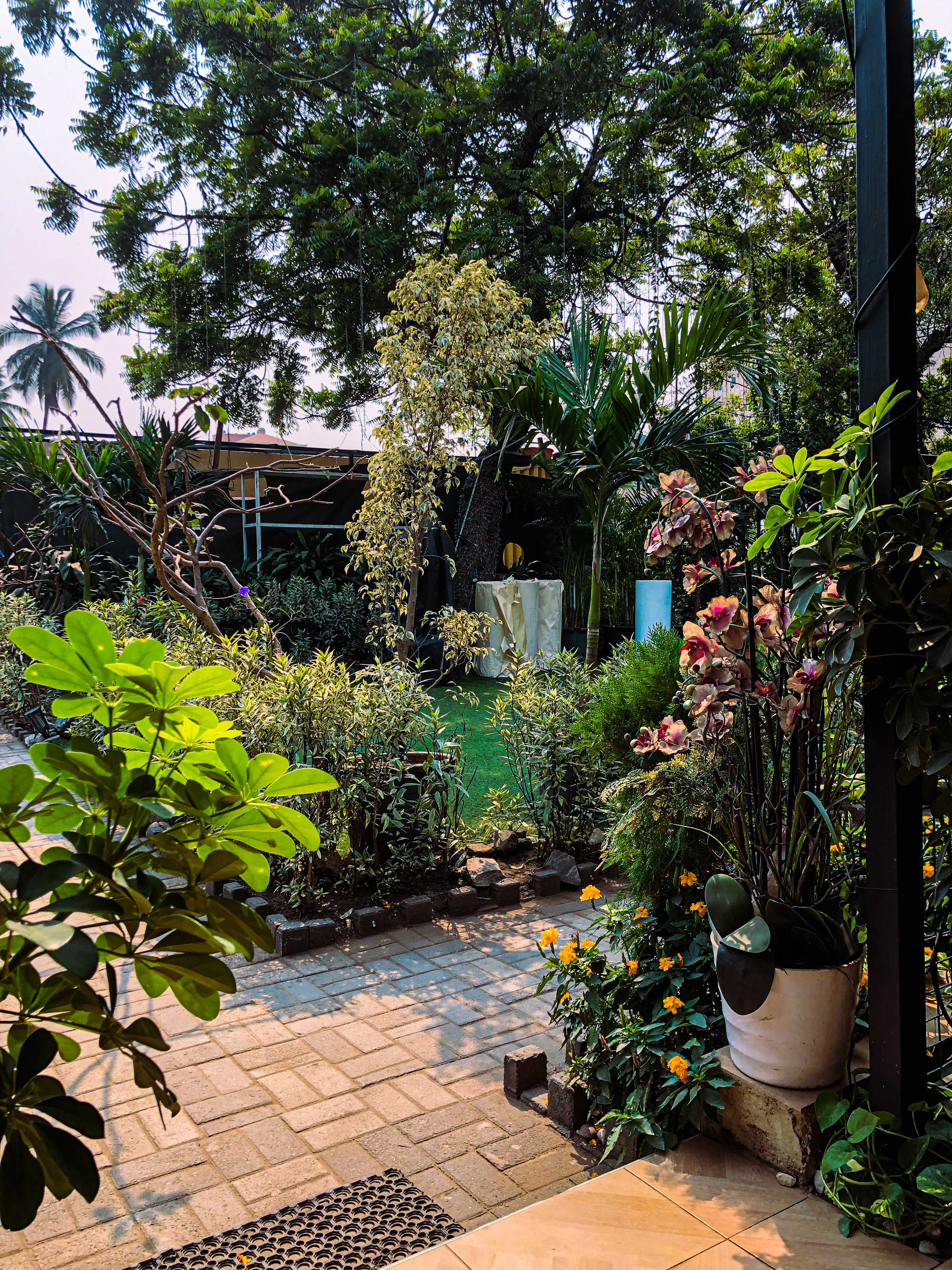
A view at The Garden, Ikoyi

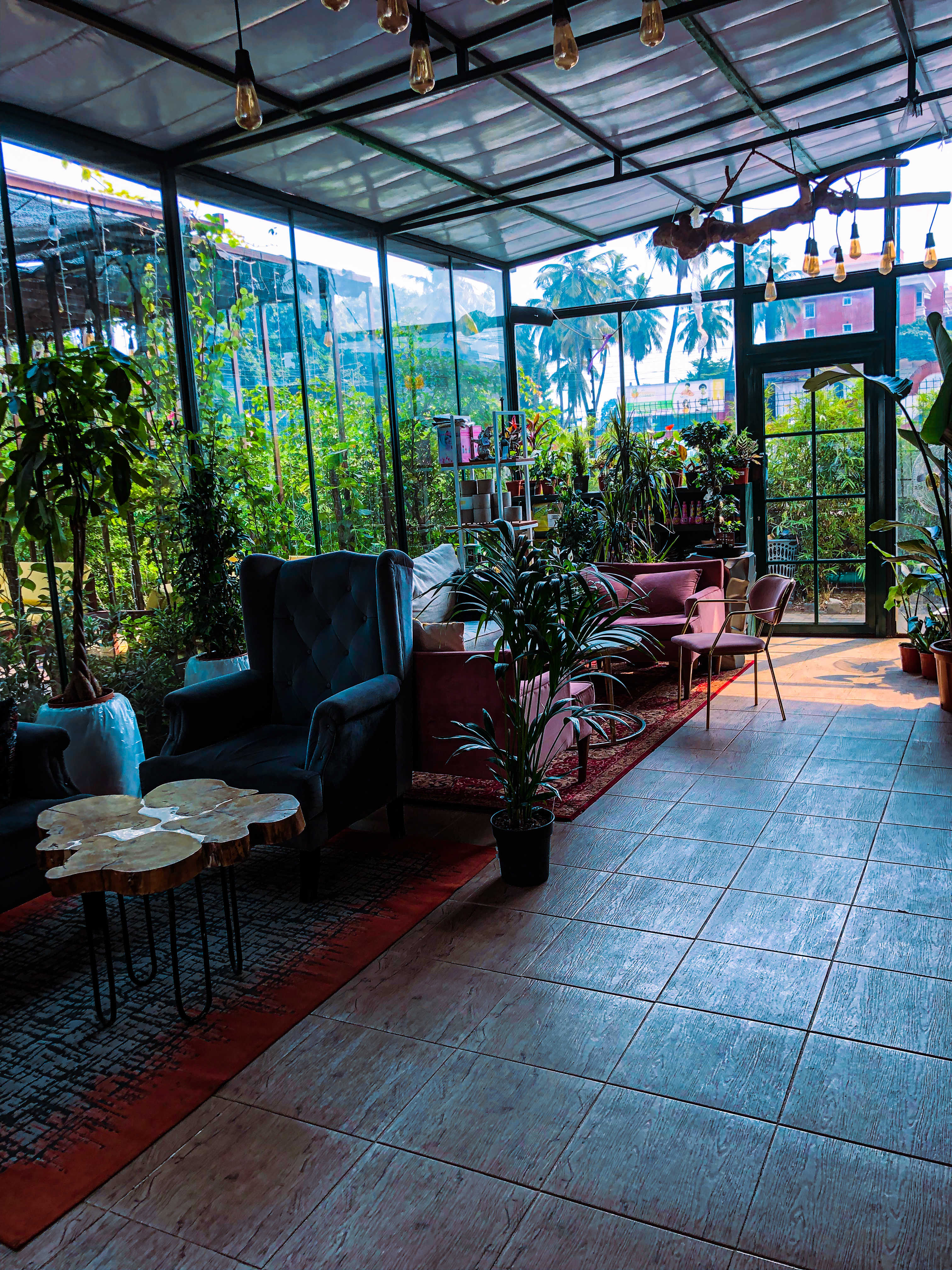
The Indoor Lounge at The Garden Ikoyi

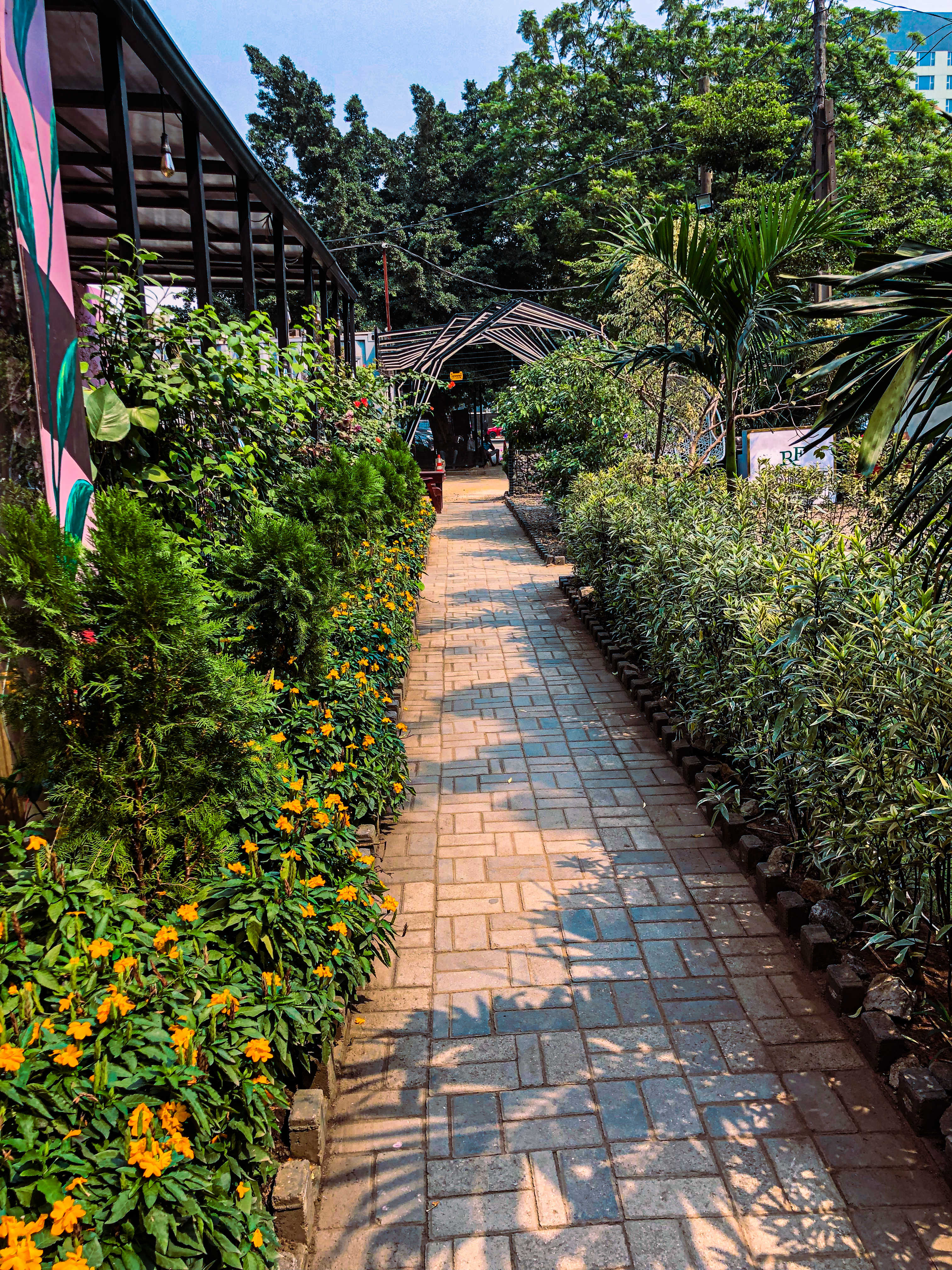
Walkway to Exit at The Garden Ikoyi

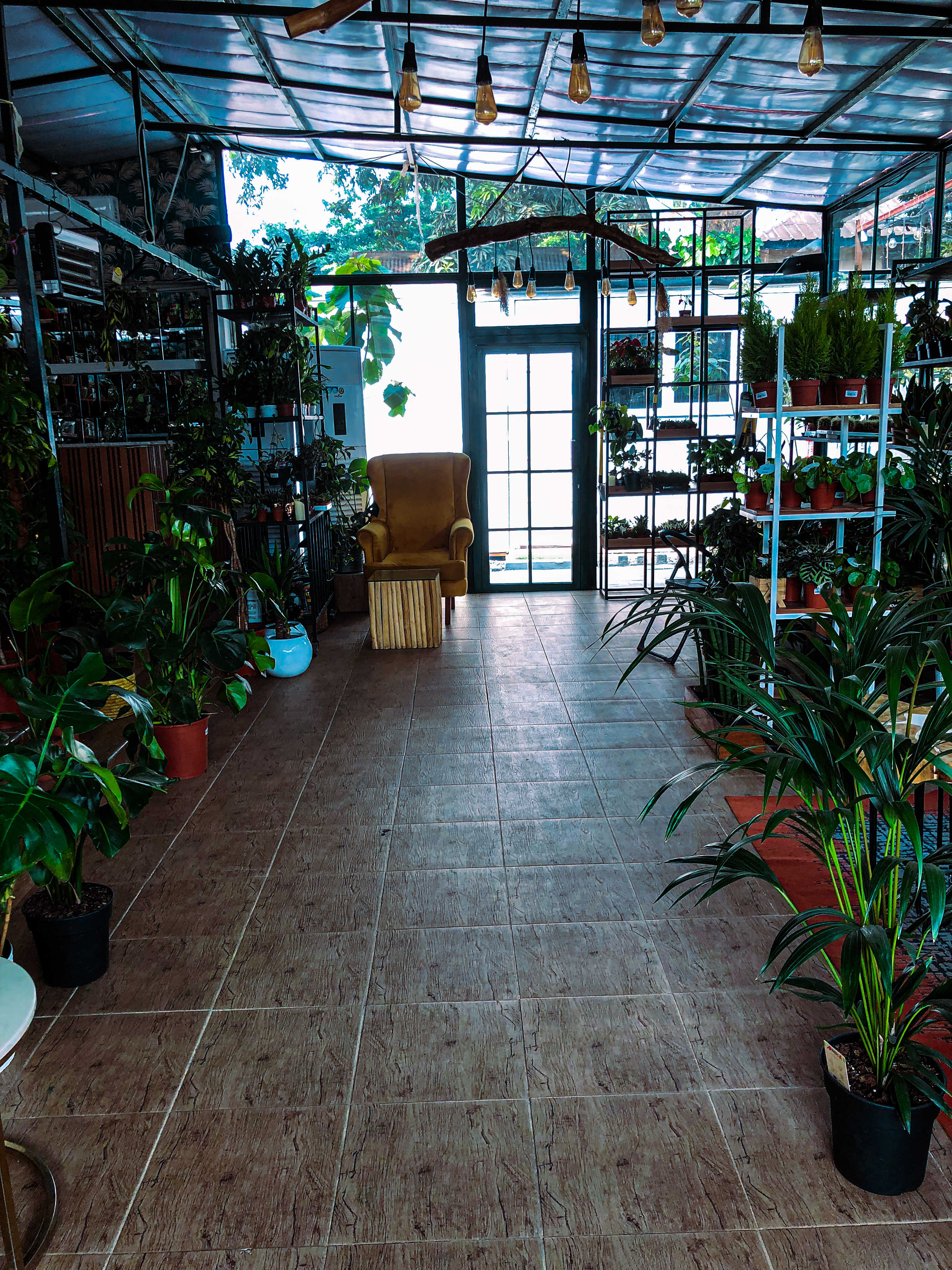
The Indoor Lounge at The Garden Ikoyi 2

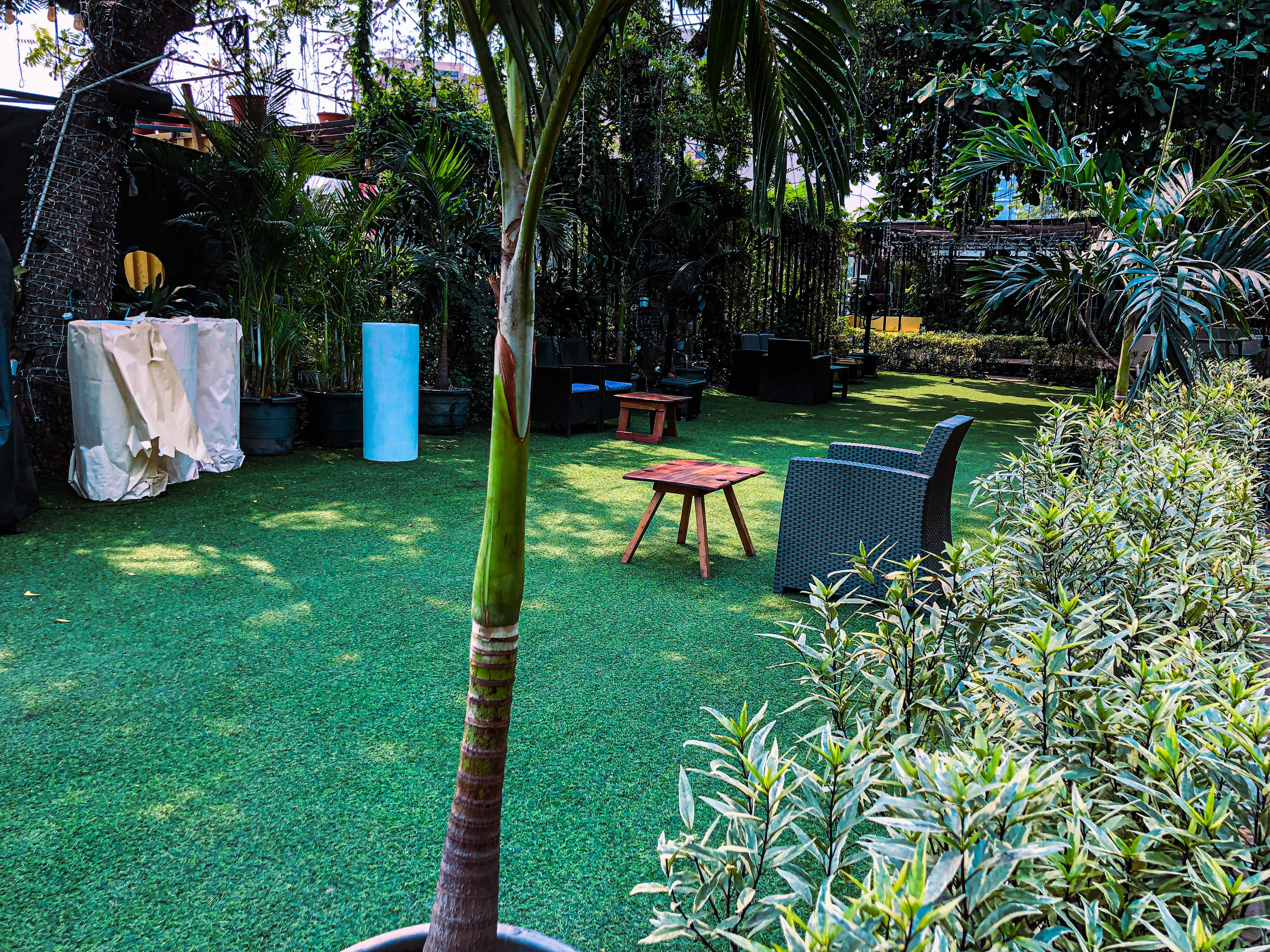
The Outdoor Space at The Garden Ikoyi
