= Tolani Tayo-Osikoya =

Nigerian chef

- Citizenship: Nigeria
- Education: Babcock University
- Occupation: Chef
- Years active: 2018-present

Tolani Tayo-Osikoya, also known as "Chef T", is a Nigerian chef and YouTuber known for her YouTube channel, Diary of a Kitchen Lover.

== Education and career ==
Tolani graduated with a BSc. in Accounting from Babcock University in 2012. She started Diary of a Kitchen Lover in 2018. In 2019 she won Jollof Master competition by Sterling Bank. Diary of a Kitchen Lover had 3 million subscribers as of 2024.

She has been an ambassador for Knorr, PZ Cussons's Morning Fresh, Malta Guinness and other brands in Nigeria. In 2023, she became part of the jury on Street Foodz Naija.

== Personal life ==
Tolani is married to Temitayo Osikoya; the couple have one child. She is Nigerian from the Yoruba ethnicity.

== Awards ==
- Content creator of the year 2022, ELOY Awards
