= Bolu Owotomo =

Nigerian politician and agricultural specialist

Hon. Bolu Owotomo

Commissioner for Agriculture and Food Security of Ogun State
- Incumbent
- Assumed office 2023
- Governor: Dapo Abiodun

Personal details
- Education: Babcock University, Harvard Business School
- Occupation: Agricultural specialist, politician

Bolu Owotomo is a Nigerian politician and agricultural specialist. Since 2023, he has served as Commissioner for Agriculture and Food Security in Ogun State.

== Education ==
Owotomo studied marketing at Babcock University, where he earned his bachelor's degree. He later attended Harvard Business School for an Executive Education programme. He also holds professional certifications including Project Management Professional (PMP) and Professional Scrum Master (PSM).

== Career ==
Owotomo's early career involved managing plantations of rubber, oil palm, and cashew. He is chairman of the Board of Ilushin Estates Limited.

He entered government service as the Senior Special Assistant to the Governor of Ogun State in the Governor's Office. Alongside this role, he was appointed General Manager of the Ogun State Agricultural Development Corporation in December 2020.

In 2023, Governor Dapo Abiodun nominated him for a commissioner role. Following confirmation, he was appointed Commissioner for Agriculture and Food Security in Ogun State.
