= Oluwatomi =

- Gender: Male
- Language: Yoruba

Origin
- Word/name: Nigeria
- Meaning: God is enough for me

Oluwatomi is a masculine given name. Notable people with the name include:

- Elijah Anuoluwapo Oluwaferanmi Oluwatomi Oluwalana Ayomikulehin Adebayo (born 1998), English footballer
- Oluwatomi Somefun, Nigerian banker
