= Adewale Maja-Pearce =

Anglo-Nigerian writer, journalist and critic (born 1953)

- Born: 1953 (age 72–73); London, England
- Education: St. Gregory's College, Lagos; University College of Wales; SOAS University of London
- Occupations: Writer, journalist and literary critic
- Spouse: Juliet Ezenwa
- Website: majapearce.blogspot.com

Adewale Maja-Pearce (born 1953) is an Anglo-Nigerian writer, journalist and literary critic, who is best known for his documentary essays. He is the author of several books, including the memoirs In My Father's Country (1987) and The House My Father Built (2014), several other non-fiction titles and a collection of short stories entitled Loyalties and Other Stories (1986).

== Early years and education ==
Adewale Maja-Pearce was born in London, England, to British and Yoruba parents. He grew up in Lagos, Nigeria, attending St. Gregory's College, Obalende (1965–69), and returned to Britain for further education at the University College of Wales, Swansea (BA, 1972–75), and at the School of Oriental and African Studies, London University (1984–86), where he gained a Master of Arts degree in African studies.

== Literary career ==
He was employed a researcher at Index on Censorship and became the journal's Africa Editor (1986–97), as well as becoming consultant and then Series Editor of the Heinemann African Writers Series (1986–94).

Having returned to Nigeria, he lives in Surulere, Lagos, in a house inherited from his father, which he has written about in his 2014 memoir The House My Father Built. Maja-Pearce runs an editorial services agency called Yemaja, as well as a small publishing company, The New Gong, founded in 2005.

=== Writing ===
Maja-Pearce has written in various genres, his early published work featuring short stories drawing on his Nigerian background, with his collection Loyalties and Other Stories appearing in 1986.

Most notable, however, as an essayist, he has written several non-fiction books, including the 2005 Remembering Ken Saro-Wiwa and Other Essays, which in the opinion of critic Uzor Uzoatu "affords us the opportunity of dipping into the immense world of Maja-Pearce as he, in twenty-three heartfelt essays and reviews, illuminates the benighted mores of modern Nigeria, the identity question in South Africa ... and engages with seminal minds across the world. ...This book is a treasure, a profound testament." Maja-Pearce was the editor of Christopher Okigbo's Collected Poems (1986), as well as of anthologies such as The Heinemann Book of African Poetry in English (1990) and Who's Afraid of Wole Soyinka?: Essays on Censorship (1991), and also wrote the 1998 and 1999 annual reports on human rights violations in Nigeria.

His memoirs include 1987's In My Father's Country: A Nigerian Journey and, most recently, The House My Father Built (2014), which the reviewer for the online magazine Bakwa described in the following terms: "a harrowing tale of Nigeria as it then was (1993–1999); a memoir of Adewale Maja-Pearce's quest to possess his birth right, his country and personal dignity. ...Mr Maja-Pearce presents the greatest cast of characters in the history of Nigerian literature. And nothing comes close, no cliché, except you consider Basi and Company by Ken Saro-Wiwa."

Maja-Pearce has written journalism, essays and reviews for a range of international publications, among them The New York Times, Granta, The London Review of Books, The Times Literary Supplement, The London Magazine, Prospect, The Baffler and the New Left Review. He became a contributing opinion writer for The International New York Times in 2013.

His 2024 book, This Fiction Called Nigeria: The Struggle for Democracy (Verso Books), which was written against the background of the 2023 elections, examining Nigeria's "crisis of democracy", is characterised by Uzor Maxim Uzoatu in The Lagos Review as "hard-hitting" and "a landmark book".

== Personal life ==
Maja-Pearce is married to the artist/activist Juliet Ezenwa.

== Bibliography ==
- In My Father's Country: A Nigerian Journey (William Heinemann, 1987), CreateSpace Independent Publishing Platform, 2011, ISBN 978-1467913973.
- How Many Miles to Babylon? An Essay, Heinemann, 1990, ISBN 978-0434441723.
- A Mask Dancing: Nigerian Novelists of the Eighties, Hans Zell Publishers, 1992. ISBN 978-0905450926.
- From Khaki to Agbada: A handbook for the February, 1999 elections in Nigeria, Civil Liberties Organisation, 1999, ISBN 978-9783218895.
- Remembering Ken Saro-Wiwa and Other Essays, New Gong, 2005, ISBN 978-9783842106.
- A Peculiar Tragedy: J. P. Clark-Bekederemo and the Beginning of Modern Nigerian Literature in English, CreateSpace Independent Publishing Platform, 2013, ISBN 978-1492184553.
- The House My Father Built, Kachifo Limited, 2014, ISBN 978-9785284218.
- This fiction called Nigeria: The Struggle for Democracy Verso, (2024), {London} and {New York}.
- Shine Your Eye: In Search of West Africa C.Hurst and Co. {London} (2026)

As editor

- Christopher Okigbo: Collected Poems, Heinemann, 1986, ISBN 978-0434532209.
- The Heinemann Book of African Poetry in English, Heinemann, 1990, ISBN 978-0435913236.
- Who's Afraid of Wole Soyinka?: Essays on Censorship, Heinemann, 1991, ISBN 978-0435909772.
- The New Gong Book of New Nigerian Short Stories, 2007, ISBN 978-1456458331.
- Dream Chasers: New Nigerian Stories, Nelson, 2013, ISBN 978-9788440352.
- This Fiction Called Nigeria: The Struggle for Democracy, Verso Books, 2024, ISBN 9781804291801.

=== Short fiction ===
Collections

- Maja-Pearce, Adewale (1986). Loyalties. Harlow: Longman.
- — (2011). Loyalties (Reprint ed.). Nigeria: The New Gong.

=== Selected book reviews ===
Year	Review article	Work(s) reviewed
2018	"Where to begin?". London Review of Books. 40 (8): 20–24. 26 April 2018.	Comolli, Virginia (2017). Boko Haram: Nigeria's Islamist insurgency. Hurst.; Thurston, Alexander (2017). Boko Haram: the history of an African jihadist movement. Princeton UP.
