= MacGregor canal =

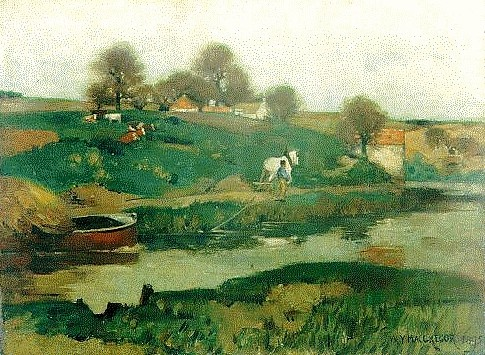
William York MacGregor - Canal 1895

MacGregor canal was built between 1903 and 1904 during the colonial administration of William MacGregor, a medical doctor and Governor of the Colony of Lagos, then a separate entity, later part of the Colony and Protectorate of Nigeria. The project was initiated as part of MacGregor's effort to reduce mosquito infestation through reclamation of swampy land in Southwest Ikoyi and Onikan, Lagos Island, particularly the Kokomaiko Swamp.

The twenty five foot wide canal was built to drain the swamp and in addition quarried to provide soil for the reclamation project. The canal cut across Ikoyi and parts of Onikan, Lagos Island, providing a border between Lagos Island and Ikoyi Island, which had previously been joined. To link both communities, a bridge was built over the canal from Obalende, a settlement that was part of the newly reclaimed swampland.

While MacGregor's anti-malaria campaign was not intended to segregate Lagos, in later years the canal served to divide Lagos Island, which developed into the commercial center of what became Nigeria's largest city, and Ikoni, where British colonial administrators built their residences within a residential cantonment for the expatriate British community, excluding Nigerians except as servants. As Chinua Achebe years later described the distinction between the two in his novel No Longer at Ease:

Going from the Lagos mainland to Ikoyi on a Saturday night was like going from a bazaar to a funeral. For all its luxurious bungalows and flats and its extensive greenery, Ikoyi was like a graveyard. It had no corporate life—At any rate for those Africans who lived there. They had not always lived there, of course. It was once a European reserve. But things had changed, and some Africans in “European posts” had been given houses in Ikoyi. Obi Okonkwo, for example lived there, and as he drove from Lagos to his flat he was struck again by these two cities in one. It always reminded him of twin kernels separated by a thin wall in a palm-nut shell. Sometimes one kernel was shiny black and alive, the other powdery white and dead.

In the 1970s, parts of the canal were sand filled to build an inner ring road around Lagos Island. A history of the growth of Lagos observed "Only those paying close attention might notice the remnants of a muddy, now garbage-filled canal cutting between the island and its wealthier eastward extension, Ikoyi."
