= Toki Mabogunje =

Nigerian lawyer, broadcaster and poet

- Education: Obafemi Awolowo University; University of Exeter
- Occupation: Lawyer
- Known for: 3rd female president Lagos Chamber of Commerce
- Website: Official website

Toki Mabogunje is a Nigerian lawyer, broadcaster, poet and business consultant. She is the 3rd female president of Lagos Chamber of Commerce and Industry (LCCI) and the founder Toki Mabogunje & Co. Toki is a member of the governing council, the World Chamber of Federation. She is a law graduate from the University of Ife (now Obafemi Awolowo University), Ile-Ife. She earned her LLM in International Business Law from the University of Exeter, England. Mabogunje was honored in 2014 as the Personality of the year for World Theater Day and Cultural Ambassador by NANTAP.

== Early life and education ==
Toki was born into a family of four children with both parents being working professionals. She is the eldest of the four children. Her father is a medical doctor while her mother is a teacher. Toki's father was the chief pathologist for Lagos state. She started her elementary education at American International School. She moved to Holy Child College to continue her Junior High school a plan by her parents to instill African culture in her. She studied law at Obafemi Awolowo University ( formerly called University of Ife) and obtained a Master in International Business Law from University of Exeter, England.

== Career ==
Mabogunje started her career with Federal Ministry of Justice where she spent 9 years of her professional career. Later, she proceeded to Mercantile and Industrial as Senior State Counsel. She left legal industry for broadcasting and started her stint with Minaj Media Group as Group Head, Legal and Corporate Affairs from where she moved to New York to head the North American Directorate of the organization. She later became the president of the international subsidiary of the firm. She returned to Nigeria in 2000 to establish Toki Mabogunje & Co., Toki was appointed to the governing council of World Chamber of Federation (WCF). During the 131 Annual General Meeting of the LCCI, Toki was appointed as the 3rd female president of the organisation Before her election as the president of the LCCI, she served as the chairperson, Board of the Business Education Services and Training Unit of the same organisation.

== Recognition ==
In 2014, she was nominated as the Personality of the Year for World Theatre day and Cultural Ambassador by NANTAP.
