= Olamide Samuel =

Nigerian security expert (born 1992)

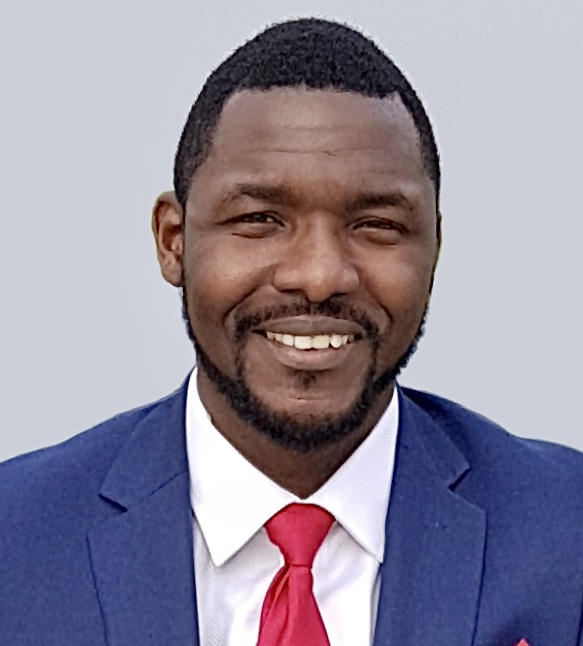
- Born: Olamide Mobolaji Samuel; 4 September 1992 (age 34); Lagos, Nigeria
- Education: Babcock University, University of Buckingham
- Occupations: Security expert, Consultant
- Known for: Attaining PhD at 25 years old

Olamide Mobolaji Samuel (born 4 September 1992) is a Nigerian arms control, nuclear policy and international security expert. He is a political and strategic advisor on arms control and a Senior Teaching Fellow at the Centre for International Studies and Diplomacy, SOAS University of London.

== Life ==
Samuel was born in Lagos on 4 September 1992. He is from the Yagba-East local government area of Kogi State, Nigeria. He received a B.Sc in International Law and Diplomacy in 2013 from Babcock University and MA in Security, Intelligence and Diplomacy in 2014 from the University of Buckingham. Samuel later received a PhD in Security and Intelligence Studies in 2019. At 25 years old, Samuel was widely reported as the youngest African to obtain a PhD in National Security Studies.

Samuel is a Senior Teaching Fellow at the School of Oriental and African Studies, SOAS University of London and the coordinator of SOAS' disarmament project at the Centre for International Studies and Diplomacy, until 2021. In 2020, Samuel was appointed as a member of the security task force in the Vatican COVID-19 Commission created by Pope Francis and is an outspoken supporter of the EndSARS movement against the Nigerian government in 2020 and also criticized U.S President Donald Trump for holding the NewSTART treaty hostage to trilateral negotiations.
