= Segun Gele =

Nigerian makeup artist

- Born: 2 May 1974 (age 52); Nigeria
- Education: St. Gregory's College, Lagos; Lagos State University
- Occupations: Actor, Entrepreneur, Events planner
- Spouse: Olufunmilola Olaleye (m. 2013)

Segun Gele (born Hakeem Oluwasegun Olaleye; 2 May 1974) is a Nigerian born makeup artist and entrepreneur based in United States. His work was featured on CNN for his ability to tie the gele in flamboyant style, a fashion attire of significant importance to the Yoruba, Nigerian and West African women's fashion culture.

He pioneered the revolutionary art of gele tying which earned him the brand-name "segungele".

== Personal life ==
Oluwasegun was born on 2 May 1974 in the Cross River State, Nigeria. He grew up in Lagos and relocated to the United States in 2001.

In 2010, he married his wife, Olufunmilola, and they have three children.

== Education and career ==
Gele is an alumnus of St. Gregory's College, Lagos. SegunGele graduated from Lagos State University in 2001, with a degree in English. His career as a fashion personality and makeup artist started in Houston. SegunGele revealed that he learnt to tie the gele from his mother while growing up. His career kickstarted when, at a party in Houston, he bet $7 with a woman to impress her by tying her gele beautifully. He won the bet and subsequently went on to make $265 that day from tying other women's headgear. He made a business out of this and is paid to tie gele and do makeovers at events.

=== Film ===
In 2017, Gele took part in the movie American Driver.
