= Lagos Preparatory School =

Selective (interview and assessment) school in Lagos, Lagos Island, Lagos, Nigeria

Lagos Preparatory And Secondary School

Location
- 36–40 Glover Road; Ikoyi; Lagos, Lagos Island, Lagos State; Nigeria; 6°27′11.4″N 3°26′10.7″E

Information
- School type: Private, not-for-profit, Selective (interview and assessment)
- Motto: Latin: Non sibi, sed omnibus (Not for one, but for all)
- Denomination: Non-denominational
- Established: 2 May 2002
- School board: Private board of directors
- Authority: Independent Schools Inspectorate (UK)
- Oversight: Standards for British Schools Overseas.
- Chairperson: Adewale Tinubu
- Head of school: John Samuel
- Faculty: 130
- Grades: K, 1–9
- Gender: coeducational
- Enrolment: 402 (September 2012)
- Education system: UK National Curriculum
- Language: English
- Hours in school day: 8:00 a.m. – 2:35 p.m.
- Campus type: suburban
- Houses: Normans, Saxons, Vikings, Romans
- Sports: swimming, ballet, karate, table tennis, football, cricket, rugby, fencing, taekwondo, netball
- School fees: N2,100,000-N3,900,000 per year
- Affiliation: IAPS (UK), COBIS (UK), AISA (Kenya)
- Preschool: 82
- Ages 5–11: 293
- Ages 11–14: 27
- Website: lagosprepikoyi.org

Lagos Preparatory & Secondary School (LPSS) is a private co-educational day school in the affluent Ikoyi suburb of Lagos, Nigeria, and has adopted the UK National Curriculum; it was established in 2002. LPSS which was formerly known as LPS, provides Early Years, Primary and Secondary school education for children from 18 months up to age 16+.

== Accreditation ==
In 2010, the school qualified for the Every Child Matters Standards Award. According to a firm called Educational Consultancy & Management (ECM) Solutions, Lagos Prep was the first international school to qualify for its ECM Standards Award.

The school has aligned itself with standards and curricular requirements of the UK National Curriculum but with an added emphasis on Nigerian history, geography and culture. As a member of the Independent Association of Preparatory Schools (IAPS), an accredited member of the Council of British International Schools (COBIS) and the Association of International Schools in Africa (AISA), LPS claims to be "currently the most highly accredited British prep school in Africa."

=== COBIS ===
The Council of British International Schools (COBIS) recognises Lagos Preparatory School as one of 33 Executive member schools, noting that Lagos Prep "remains the only school in Africa in both IAPS and COBIS." Aside from the British International School in Cairo and the Maadi British International School, also in Cairo, Lagos Prep is the only school in Africa that is COBIS-accredited; the others are in various European countries, Brunei, China, the Middle East and Turkey.

=== ISI and UK Department for education ===
In February 2011, following an inspection by the Independent Schools Inspectorate (ISI), the school claims, it became the first British School in Africa to meet the UK Department for Education (DfE)'s current standards for British Overseas Schools. The DfE does in fact recognise Lagos Preparatory School as one of only 12 overseas schools that satisfy its "standards required for continuing registration as a school in England." Lagos Prep is the only African school that DfE lists; the others are in the Middle East, China, France, Spain, Czech Republic and Malaysia.

The ISI makes available its Integrated Handbook Framework both for the use of inspectors in their reporting and to assist schools in helping them to address deficiencies and to reach the ISI-required standard for accreditation. The DfE's 2011 school inspection report recommended that Lagos Preparatory School "establish consistent and secure analysis of pupil performance data, to identify rates of progress and ensure that pupils are reaching their maximum potential" and "put in place measures rigorously to evaluate and improve the quality of teaching and learning, particularly in Years 2 to 7."

== School details ==
=== Staff ===
The school's executive staff includes the headmaster, 77 faculty and 35 supporting staff.

=== Location ===
The school is in Ikoyi, a suburb of Lagos which formerly housed the British colonial administration of Nigeria and which is now affordable only for people extremely wealthy by Nigerian standards, typically Nigerian government and military officers, as well as foreign oil and telecommunications company executives.

=== Fees ===
Parents must pay a fee of $9,000 per year plus $270 a year for required school uniforms, swimwear and clothing for physical education.

=== Charity ===
In 2004, the Oxford Nursery and Primary School in Ibeju Lekki, Lagos State received a stocked library from the pupils of the Lagos Preparatory School. Funds had been raised by "taxes" of 100 Naira each (about 60 cents US) paid by the children on days when the school permitted students not to wear the uniforms usually required.
