= Shola Akinlade =

Nigerian software engineer and entrepreneur

Shola Akinlade OON
- Born: Lagos, Nigeria
- Education: St Gregory's College; Babcock University (BSc)
- Occupations: Software engineer entrepreneur
- Years active: 2016–present
- Known for: Paystack; Sporting Lagos F.C.

Shola Akinlade is a Nigerian software engineer and entrepreneur, best known as the co-founder and CEO of Paystack, a financial technology company acquired by U.S. payments firm Stripe in 2020 in a deal reported to be worth approximately $200 million. In 2022, he was conferred with the national honour of Officer of the Order of the Niger (OON) by Nigerian President Muhammadu Buhari for his contributions to the advancement of technology in finance and business.

== Early life ==
Akinlade was born and raised in Lagos, Nigeria. He had his secondary education at St Gregory's College, Lagos. In 2006, he obtained a degree in computer science from Babcock University. He started working at Heineken as a trainee for the company's database management. He later worked as a software engineer with several banks. In 2015, he founded Paystack with Ezra Olubi.

== Business career ==
=== Paystack ===
Akinlade's company Paystack was a part of startup accelerator Y Combinator's 2016 batch of startups and it was founded in 2015. The company was created to help businesses in Africa get paid online and offline.

In 2020, following Paystack's acquisition by Stripe, Akinlade said, "We couldn't be more excited to join forces with Stripe, whose mission and values are so aligned with ours, to nurture transformative businesses on the continent."

=== Sporting Lagos F.C. ===
In 2022, Akinlade founded a football club, Sporting Lagos F.C. which he notes is a platform for community development and social change.

=== Aarhus Fremad ===
In March 2023, Akinlade acquired a 55% stake in the Danish 2nd division football club Aarhus Fremad. The plan is for Aarhus Fremad to support the professionalisation of Sporting Lagos F.C., relying on Sporting Lagos F.C. as a talent academy in return. It was in line with his efforts in community development and core social change, enabling local players to find career opportunities in Europe.

=== Zap ===
Paystack launched Zap, a mobile application that allows foreigners in Nigeria to make payments using foreign cards, in 2025. According to The Guardian, the application was first released on 14 November 2024 and updated on 3 March 2025, and had recorded over 1,000 downloads on the Google Play Store.

== Awards ==
In October 2022, Akinlade was conferred with the Officer of the Order of the Niger (OON) by President Muhammadu Buhari of Nigeria in recognition of his contributions to the advancement of technology in finance and business. He has received numerous awards for innovation, leadership, and his outstanding contributions to the African digital space.

== Impacts ==
Akinlade has mentored young entrepreneurs and tech professionals in the hope of turning their ideas into impact and opportunities.
