= Ezra Olubi =

Nigerian entrepreneur and LGBT advocate (born 1986)

- Born: Ezra Olubi; 12 November 1986 (age 39); Ibadan, Oyo state, Nigeria
- Education: Babcock University Illishan Remo, Ogun State
- Occupations: Entrepreneur, IT expert, Chief Technology Officer, Software and Mobile App Developer
- Years active: 2006-till present
- Known for: LGBTIQ Advocacy, Entrepreneurship, IT, PayStack
- Title: Co-founder PayStack

Ezra Olubi (born 12 November 1986) is a Nigerian entrepreneur, software developer, and Co-founder of Paystack where he also served as the Chief Technology Officer (CTO).

== Education ==
Ezra studied computer science at Babcock University, where he developed his skills as a software developer and won exhibition awards on campus.

== Career ==
After completing his university education, Ezra began a career in software development. He worked at Softcom Imagio Limited, where he served as Head of Product Development and contributed to building Eyowo, an early unified payment system. He later served as Chief Technology Officer at Jobberman.

In 2016, alongside Shola Akinlade, he co-founded Paystack, an e-payment platform. Paystack simplified the process of integrating payment gateways into websites and became one of the first Nigerian startups accepted into Y Combinator. The company was acquired by Stripe for $200 million in 2020.

== Personal life ==
On April 10, 2021, he displayed one of his outfits that he wore to attend a friend's function via his Twitter handle, with the inscription: 'My friend invited me to her wedding party and all I heard was "Ezra, get dressed!"' Ezra, a heterosexual male, often wears lipstick and has his nails done, defying traditional masculine norms.

== Suspension and Controversy on X(formerly Twitter) ==
In November 2025, he was suspended by Paystack following allegations on social media suggesting sexual misconduct with a subordinate. The allegation, as well as his resurfaced tweets from 2009 - 2013, have started ongoing social media outrage

== Termination from Paystack ==
In November 2025, he was fired from Paystack by the Board of Directors over the alleged sexual misconduct and the resurfacing of his controversial past tweets. Ezra regarded his termination unfair and seeks legal means.
