= Gbenga Shobo =

Nigerian banker (born 1963)

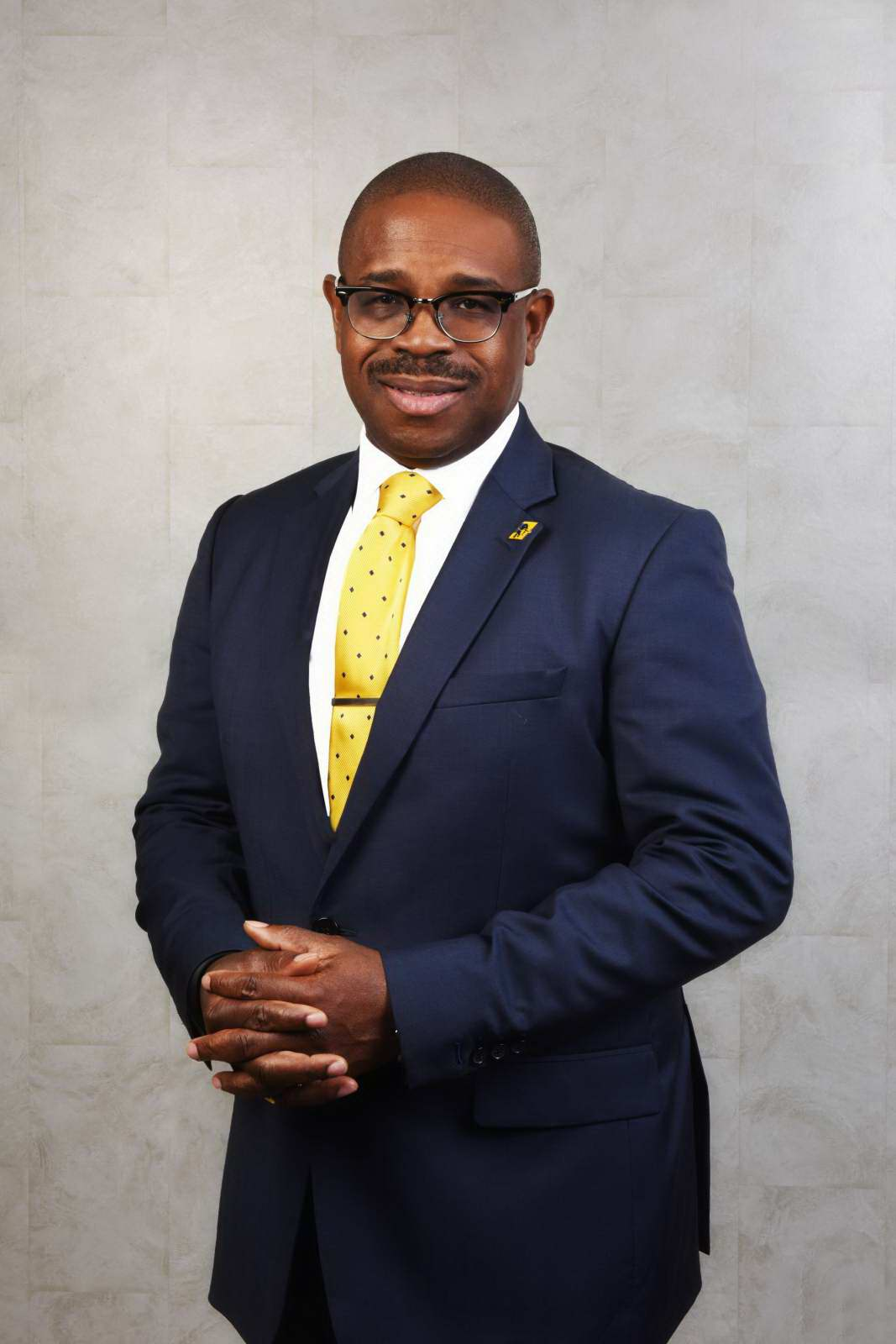

Deputy Managing Director, First Bank of Nigeria Limited
- Incumbent
- Assumed office 28 April 2021

Deputy Managing Director, First Bank of Nigeria Limited
- In office December 2015 – April 2021

Personal details
- Born: Gbenga Shobo; June 2, 1963 (age 63) Lagos, Lagos State, Nigeria
- Spouse: Vivien Shobo
- Children: 2
- Education: University of Ife
- Profession: Banker

Gbenga Francis Shobo (born June 2, 1963) is currently Deputy Managing Director, First Bank of Nigeria Limited; before which, he was Executive Director, Retail Banking with the bank. A chartered accountant, Gbenga began his career with Coopers & Lybrand, a firm of chartered accountants, in 1986. Thereafter, he joined Victory Merchant Bank, commencing a career in banking that has spanned 23 years.

== Early life ==
Gbenga was born in Lagos. His father was a chemical engineer and mother was a nurse. Gbenga has two older siblings, Tosin and Funmi. He attended St Gregory's College, Lagos for his secondary school certificate, before completing a bachelor's degree in political science at the University of Ife.

== Career ==
=== FBN Merchant Bank Limited ===
Gbenga worked for one year (2004 – 2005) with FBN Merchant Bank as general manager of corporate/commercial banking. He had responsibility for credit, relationship management, and business development, in a role that saw him coordinate the operations of the bank's branches across the country.

=== First Bank of Nigeria Limited ===
Gbenga joined FirstBank from FBN Merchant Bank Limited as group head of national corporates in 2006. He held different offices in the bank before becoming executive vice president of Retail South in 2010. Impassioned by the prospects for domestic small- and medium-sized businesses, in his role as executive director, Lagos & West, Gbenga was responsible for the public sector and retail banking businesses of FirstBank in the Lagos and West area.

On Monday 4 January 2016, Gbenga assumed office as deputy managing director, First Bank of Nigeria Limited.

FBN General Insurance Limited

Gbenga held other roles within the FBN Holdings Group, most notably as Non Executive Director and Chairman of FBN General Insurance Limited effective March 21, 2016

== Personal life ==
A keen golfer and active lawn tennis player, Gbenga is married to Vivien Shobo, the former CEO of Nigeria's leading rating agency, Agusto & Co. They have two sons.
