= Aisha Ochuwa =

Nigerian lawyer and entrepreneur (born 1994)

Aisha Ochuwa Tella
- Born: 22 April 1994 (age 32); Lagos State, Nigeria
- Education: Babcock University
- Occupations: Lawyer; entrepreneur
- Years active: 2017–present
- Known for: Aishaochuwa Group Limited

Aisha Ochuwa Tella (born 22 April 1994) is a Nigerian lawyer and entrepreneur. She is also the founder of Aishaochuwa Group Limited formerly known as EBAO, a Nigerian fashion company founded in 2017.

== Early life ==
Aisha Ochuwa Tella was born on 22 April 1994 in Lagos State, Nigeria but originally hails from Auchi, Edo State. She completed her primary and secondary education in Lagos State. Later on, she acquired a Diploma in Criminology and a LL.B degree with a Second Class Upper Division – both from Babcock University

== Career ==
Ochuwa had always wanted to venture into business. In 2010, she started as a jewelry seller while she was in her first year in Babcock University. After her graduation from the university in 2015, she proceeded to the Nigerian Law School and graduated in 2016. Shortly, she worked as a commercial and corporate lawyer in a law firm in Lagos. In 2017, she founded her own company Everything Beautiful by AishaOchuwa(EBAO), a company that manufactures jewelry. She later changed to Aishaochuwa Group Limited as the parent name for her other company.

As a lawyer, Ochuwa practices in both Nigeria and the United Kingdom. She is a member of the Nigeria Bar Association and the Chartered Institute of Arbitration (UK).

In September 2022, Ochuwa won the DENSA Awards for Most Productive Female of the Year. She also received the African Brand Award from Silverbird Group as a Top Leading & Innovative Luxury Jewellery Brand of the year. She was also recognized as the Young Entrepreneur of the Year at the YEIS Awards 2022. In April 2023, she was listed among the top 5 female entrepreneurs in Nigeria alongside Mo Abudu and Hilda Bacci by Leadership. In July 2023, she released a book titled A Guide To Starting An Online Business.

== Recognition and membership ==
In 2024, Aisha was awarded Honorary Doctorate Degree in business management and corporate governance by the European American University. She is a fellowship with the Institute of Chartered Administrators and Researchers of Nigeria, Fellowship of the Institute of Management Consultants (and conferment of the status of Certified Management Consultant) and She is a member of Forbes BLK.
