= Patrick Ekeji =

Nigerian footballer and sports administrator

Patrick Chima Ekeji
Personal information
- Date of birth: 11 March 1951 (age 74)
- Place of birth: Ndiegbelu-Umu-Ogwu
- Position: Defender

Patrick Chima Ekeji (born 11 March 1951) is a former Nigerian sports administrator and footballer. He studied at both the University of Nigeria, Nsukka, where he obtained a first degree in Physical Education in 1978, and the University of Frankfurt, Germany, graduating in 1982. As a high school student, Ekeji played in the defence for the East Central State Academicals, winners of the Manuwa Adebajo Cup in 1971.

Ekeji attended St Jude’s Catholic Primary School, Amuzi, Imo State (1955); St Mathias Catholic School, Lafiaji, Lagos (1956); St George’s Primary School, Falomo, Lagos (1958–1962); St Gregory’s College, Lagos (1963–1967); Community Secondary School, Amuzi (1970); Mbaise Secondary School (WASC, 1971); Holy Ghost College, Owerri (1971–1972).

Highlights of Ekeji's footballing career include stints with the national team, the Green Eagles (1975–1980); Rangers of Enugu (1977/1978); and Vasco Da Gama FC Enugu (1973–1977). Ekeji also played for the East Central State side, The Spartans, winners of the football gold medal at the 1st National Sports Festival, Lagos in 1973

Following his appointment in 1993 as Director of Sports in Imo State, Ekeji was appointed National Director of Sports at the National Sports Commission in December 1994, Director of Sports Development at the National Sports Commission, 2001, and Director-General, National Sports Commission in 2009, a post he retired from in 2013. Ekeji briefly coached the national football team in 1986. Ekeji, whose main hobby in retirement include charitable activities, is married to Ngozi Immaculata Pat Ekeji. They have 6 children.
