= Vincent Babatunde Chukumeka Nwuga =

Vincent Babatunde Chukumeka Nwuga (1939–2015) was the first Nigerian professor of physiotherapy.

== Early life ==
He was born on April 22, 1939, in Enugu, Nigeria, to Mr. Christopher Aniemeka Nwuga and Mrs. Agness Nwuga (Nee Okolo) from Asaba in Oshimili Local Government Area in the then Western Region of Nigeria (which became, Mid-West, Bendel states, and presently Delta State of Nigeria). His mother was a primary school teacher and his father was a civil servant with the Federal Ministry of Finance. He earned a London Matriculation Examination Certificate, which at the time was a highly regarded credential.

== Education ==
He attended Holy Cross Catholic Primary School (1945–1952), and St. Gregory’s College, Lagos (1953–1958) for his secondary school education. In 1961, he then proceeded to the United Kingdom for his Higher School Certificate in physics, biology and chemistry at the Polytechnic, Harrogate, ⁣ in Yorkshire. He also attended the Royal Herbert Hospital School of Physiotherapy in Woolwich. He proceeded to Canada, where he earned a bachelor's degree in physical therapy (BPT) in 1971, and a master's degree in physical medicine in 1974 from the United States of America.

== Membership ==
He was a member of the Chartered Society of Physiotherapy (CSP).

== Publications and articles ==
1. He wrote "Manipulation Of the Spine".
2. A study of group-self identification among the disabled in Nigeria: A case for support groups.
3. Comparative study of physiotherapy educators in Great Britain, Nigeria and the United States.
4. Relationship between personality and adjustment to disability among male Nigerian paraplegics.
5. Evaluative study of an education programme for patients with back pain.
6. Ability to cope with prejudice and role of the visibility factor among paraplegics and the emotionally disturbed.
