= Tomi Davies =

Nigerian-British business executive

- Born: Harry Tomi Davies; June 9, 1955 (age 71)
- Education: University of Miami
- Known for: angel investment, startups, advisor, speaker
- Notable work: Supa Strikas, The African Project Manager
- Partner: Lola Davies
- Children: 3
- Website: tomidavies.com

Harry Tomi Davies (born June 9, 1955) is a Nigerian British investor, speaker, author, entrepreneur, philanthropist and advisor to technology companies. He is the chief executive officer of TVCLabs, a technology business accelerator based in Lagos, and the founding president of the African Business Angel Network (ABAN), an organization that supports investment and mentorship for African startups. He has worked in information technology and consulting with companies including IBM, Marks & Spencer, Ernst & Young, and Sapient. He also speaks publicly on topics related to business and entrepreneurship in Africa.

== Early life ==
Davies attended his primary education at Corona School, Victoria Island, Lagos and later proceeding for his secondary school education at King's College, Lagos and St Gregory's College, Ikoyi, Lagos respectively. He is an alumnus of University of Miami and University of Miami School of Business.

== Business career ==
=== Early career ===
Davies worked with IBM and later held information technology and consulting roles in the United Kingdom and Nigeria, including positions at Marks & Spencer, Ernst & Young, and Sapient. He also worked on public-sector projects in Nigeria, including the World Bank funded pilot of the Integrated Payroll & Personnel System (IPPIS).

=== Business angel investing ===
In August 2012, Davies began angel investing in earnest by co-founding Lagos Angel Network which is a network of individuals and organizations who invest in and mentor start-ups based in Lagos, Nigeria. He later moved on to be the co-founder and president of the African Business Angels Network, a pan-African non-profit association founded to support the development of early-stage investor networks in November 2014. In 2024, he was awarded a Lifetime Achievement Award by the European Business Angel Network (EBAN)

=== TechnoVision ===
After helping found the company in 1999, in 2009, Davies became the chief executive officer of TechnoVision. From 2010 to 2012 he joined the team that revived Mobitel as its chief operating officer.

=== SupaStrikas ===
Davies owns Strika Entertainment Nigeria, which is the publisher of SupaStrikas in Nigeria and Ghana. SupaStrikas comics is a fantasy football league comic and Africa's highest-circulation publication, with over one million copies circulated monthly to South Africa, Nigeria, Kenya, Uganda, Namibia and Botswana.

=== SlimTrader ===
Davies served as an advisor at SlimTrader.

== GreenTec Capital Partners ==
In 2020, Davies was appointed as the chief investment officer at GreenTec Capital Partners.

== Philanthropy ==
Davies co-founded Laptop 4 Learning, an initiative created to provide access screen-based technology to underprivileged primary school children and their teachers.

== Recognition ==
Davies was named the Icon of Hope at the Comic Panel Hero Award 2014. Davies was also given a Distinguished SME Partner Award by Fidelity Bank Nigeria In 2011, he was named Information Technology Champion by the Institute of Software Practitioners of Nigeria (ISPON) and recognized as top 100 Bame leaders influencing the tech sector.

In 2020 tagged him "Africa's top Angel" in an article that describes Davies angel investment journey from the first company he backed in 2001, his first exit and a decade later being recognized as an architect of early-stage investing across Africa and President of The African Business Angel Network in 2015.

In January 2022 Davies was named by New African Magazine as one of the "100 Most Influential Africans of 2021" for his work nurturing early stage networks.

== Personal life ==
Tomi Davies is married to Lola Davies and they have three children together.

== Published works ==
Davies first published book was titled Corporate Bold: What Every Corporate Professional Should Know (ISBN 978-1462015139) on June 28, 2011. He later went on to co-author Cracking The Success Code with Brian Tracy (ISBN 978- 0985364304) on May 25, 2012,The African Project Manager: Managing Projects Successfully in Africa (ISBN 978-1494285340) on September 19, 2014, and Investment Worthy Startup: Building Business Ventures Investors Want To Fund on February 8, 2023.
