= Ganiyu Dawodu =

Nigerian politician

Ganiyu Olawale Dawodu // (1935–2006) popularly known as G.O.D. in Lagos, was a Nigerian politician and democracy activist. He was a leading member of the National Democratic Coalition popularly known as NADECO in Nigeria during the reign of Sani Abacha. The coalition then was a puissant movement to free jailed politician M.K.O Abiola from prison, in the process, he was jailed for his pro Abiola stance.

In 2000, he was in a battle of supremacy for the Lagos branch of the old Alliance for Democracy political party. He had opposed the emergence of Governor Tinubu in 1998-1999 and had supported the late Funsho Williams, Tinubu's opposition. Their differences spilled over into 2000, and by 2003, he left the party to the Progressives Action Coalition and was the Lagos gubernatorial candidate of the party.

Dawodu was born in Lagos and attended Ansar Ud Deen, Elementary School, Okepopo, Lagos. He then attended Ahmadiya High School before going to St Gregory's College, Lagos.

During the Nigerian First Republic, he was a member of the Lagos city council and later became the chairman of the Lagos Town Council.
