= Paystack =

Nigerian financial technology company

- Industry: Fintech
- Founded: 2015
- Founder: Shola Akinlade, Ezra Olubi
- Headquarters: Lagos, Nigeria
- Parent: Stripe
- Website: Paystack.com

Paystack is a Nigerian financial technology company that provides payment processing services for businesses in Africa. Founded in 2015 by software engineers Shola Akinlade and Ezra Olubi, the company participated in the Y Combinator startup accelerator in 2016. In October 2020, Paystack was acquired by Stripe for over $200 million. At the time of the transaction, the company secured payments for approximately 60,000 merchants.

== History ==
Paystack was founded in 2015 by Nigerian computer science graduates Shola Akinlade and Ezra Olubi. The company later participated in the Y Combinator startup accelerator, receiving early-stage funding in Silicon Valley. Paystack publicly launched in 2016 after participating in Y Combinator's Winter 2016 cohort.

In October 2020, Stripe announced its acquisition of Paystack for over $200 million, marking one of the largest fintech acquisitions in Africa. As part of the deal, Stripe stated that Paystack would serve as a “growth engine for modern businesses in Africa,” with plans to support more businesses and consolidate the fragmented African payments market.

In November 2020, BBC News reported that Paystack processed over 50% of all web payments in Nigeria and served over 60,000 organizations, including FedEx, UPS, and MTN. The article described Paystack as part of Africa’s expanding digital payments sector. BBC also reported that improved digital payment and clearing systems could help small businesses and traders across Africa save time and costs.

In May 2021, Paystack expanded its operations to South Africa, its first market expansion outside Nigeria following the Stripe acquisition.

In November 2023, Bloomberg reported that Paystack was restructuring its operations, scaling back in Europe and the Middle East to focus on expanding within African markets.

== Funding ==
In 2016, Paystack raised $1.3 million in seed funding from investors, including Tencent and Comcast Ventures. In 2018, the company secured $8 million in a Series A funding round led by Stripe, with participation from Visa, and Tencent. In 2020, Stripe acquired Paystack for over $200 million, as part of its expansion into Africa. Prior to the acquisition, Paystack served around 60,000 businesses, processing both online and offline transactions.

== Global investment in African fintech ==
The acquisition of Paystack coincided with a period of increased foreign investment in African financial technology companies. Similar transactions during this period included Network International's acquisition of DPO Group for $288 million and WorldRemit's acquisition of Sendwave for $500 million. Market analysts have attributed this investment trend to high mobile money adoption rates and a large unbanked population across the continent. Following the acquisition, multinational financial firms, including Visa, Mastercard, PayPal, and Tencent, also expanded their investments in African fintech startups. At the time of the transaction, Stripe co-founder Patrick Collison noted that online commerce in Africa was projected to grow by approximately 30% annually.

According to CNN, the COVID-19 pandemic contributed to increased digital banking adoption across Africa, with Paystack reporting a fivefold rise in business sign-ups in 2020. Paystack co-founder Shola Akinlade stated that the pandemic highlighted how many African businesses lacked adequate digital infrastructure, making it challenging for them to transition to online transactions.

In April 2022, Reuters reported that African startups raised $5.2 billion in venture capital in 2021, with fintech firms accounting for 60% of total investment. The article cited Paystack's acquisition by Stripe as an example of international interest in African startups.

In March 2025, Business Day published an article stating that Africa’s e-commerce sector is expanding, driven by a growing middle class and increased smartphone adoption. It stated that, "as digital payments improve and trust in online shopping grows, e-commerce is expected to play a pivotal role in Africa’s economic transformation". The article also mentioned Paystack, along with Flutterwave and M-Pesa, as companies that have transformed the digital payments landscape and facilitated financial transactions across the continent.

In 2026, Paystack announced the acquisition of Ladder Microfinance Bank, indicating a move beyond payment processing into other areas of financial services.

== Startup Act (2022) ==
Fintech is one of the fastest-growing tech sectors in Africa, providing mobile money, digital payments, and lending solutions to unbanked populations. Nigeria has become a key hub for fintech startups, attracting investment and international expansion. In 2022, the Nigerian government enacted the Startup Act, which introduced tax incentives and funding mechanisms to support entrepreneurs.

== Partnerships ==
- 2016: Launched a payments solution integrated with e-commerce platform Shopify to allow more African retailers to sell their goods on the platform.
- 2021: Selected as the preferred payment partner of open-source e-commerce solution WooCommerce.
- 2021: Introduced Pay with Apple Pay on its platform.
- 2022: Partnered with accounting software provider Xero, enabling Xero users in Africa to add a "Pay with Paystack" button to their invoices.

== See also ==
- Interswitch
- PayPal
- PAGA (Payments and Financial Solutions company)
- Stripe (company)
- E-commerce payment system
- List of online payment service providers
- Payment service provider
