= Unity Bank plc =

Building in Nigeria

- Type: Public: NSE: UNITYBNK
- Industry: Financial services
- Founded: 2006
- Headquarters: Victoria Island, Lagos, Nigeria
- Key people: Thomas Ethuh; Chairman; Tomi Somefun; Managing Director
- Products: Loans, Credit Cards, Savings, Investments, Mortgages
- Revenue: ▲Aftertax:US$38.7 million (NGN:6.2 billion) (2012)
- Total assets: US$2.45 billion (NGN:396 billion) (2012)
- Number of employees: 2,072 (2012)
- Website: Homepage

Unity Bank, also known as Unity Bank plc, is a commercial bank in Nigeria.

== Overview ==
Unity Bank is a mid sized financial services provider in Nigeria. Headquartered in Lagos, Nigeria's commercial capital. Unity Bank also maintains an operations base in Abuja, Nigeria's capital. As of December 2012, the bank's total assets were valued at about US$2.45 billion (NGN:396 billion), with shareholders' equity of approximately US$322 million (NGN:51.5 billion).

== History ==
In January 2006, nine financial institutions with expertise in corporate banking, retail banking, as well as investment banking, came together to form Unity Bank plc. In 2024, The Central Bank of Nigeria approved the merger of Unity Bank with Providus Bank.

== Unity Bank Group ==
Unity Bank plc, is the flagship institution of the Unity Bank Group. Other members of the financial services group include the following:

- Unity Capital & Trust Limited
- Caranda Management Services Limited
- Unity Registrars Limited
- Northlink Insurance Brokers Limited
- Newdevco Investments & Securities Limited
- UnityKapital Assurance plc
- Pelican Prints Limited
- Unity Bank BDC
- Hexali Properties Limited

NB; most of the subsidiaries has been sold.

== Ownership ==
The shares of stock Unity Bank plc are listed on the Nigerian Stock Exchange, where they trade under the symbol: UNITYBNK. The detailed shareholding in the bank is not publicly available at this time.

== Branch network ==
As of December 2010, Unity Bank plc maintained 242 branches across all states of Nigeria, giving it the 7th-largest branch network in the country. Another 25 branches were planned at that time.

== See also ==
- List of banks in Nigeria
- Economy of Nigeria
