= Oluwatomi Somefun =

Nigerian banker

- Born: October 2nd
- Education: University of Ife; Harvard Business School; University of Columbia Business School, New York
- Occupation: Banker
- Employer: Unity Bank plc

Oluwatomi Somefun is a Nigerian business woman and banker. She served as the managing director and CEO of Unity Bank plc from August 2015 to March 2025.

== Education and career ==
She obtained a B.Ed. in English Language in 1981 from the Obafemi Awolowo University, Ile-Ife in Osun state and an alumnus of Harvard Business school and University of Columbia Business School, New York.

Somefun began her professional career with Peat Marwick and Co. and later moved to Arthur Andersen (now KPMG) before becoming an executive director at Unity Bank plc.
