= Babcock University =

Seven-day Adventist college in Ogun State, Nigeria

- Former names: Adventist College of West Africa, Adventist Seminary of West Africa
- Motto: Knowledge, Truth, Service
- Type: Private
- Established: 1959
- Affiliations: Seventh-day Adventist Church
- Chairperson: Bassey Effiong Okon Udoh
- President: Afolarin Ojewole
- Vice-president: Prof. Amanze Philemon, Prof. Haliso Yacob
- Vice-Chancellor: Professor Afolarin Ojewole
- Students: 20,000+
- Location: Ilishan-Remo, Ogun State, Nigeria; 6.894°N 3.7187°E
- Campus: Main Campus Ilishan-Remo, Mini Campus Iperu, Remo
- Government accreditation: 1999
- Colours: Blue and Gold
- Website: babcock.edu.ng

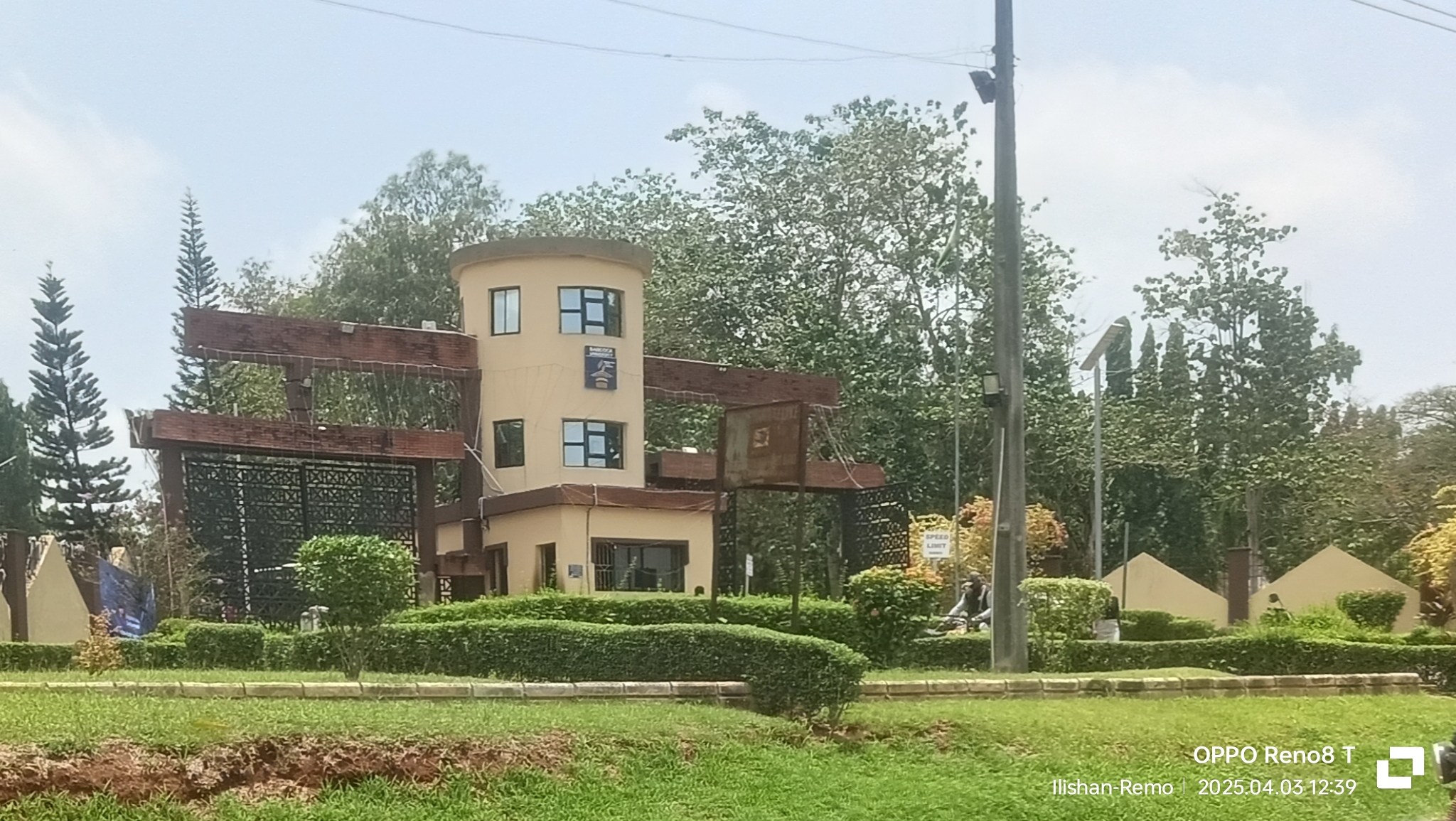
Babcock University main entrance

Babcock University is a private Christian co-educational Nigerian university owned and operated by the Seventh-day Adventist Church in Nigeria. The university is located at Ilishan-Remo, Ogun State, Nigeria, equidistant between Ibadan and Lagos.

In 2017, the university had its first set of graduates from the Ben Carson School of Medicine.

It is a part of the Seventh-day Adventist education system, which is the world's second largest Christian school system.

== History ==
Babcock University was named after David C. Babcock, an American missionary who pioneered the work of the Seventh-day Adventist Church in Nigeria in 1914. He was based in Erunmu in Oyo State, Nigeria.

The university was established as the Adventist College of West Africa (ACWA) in 1959, initially with seven students; who were hosted at the home of Chief Olufemi Okulaja. In 1975, it changed its name to Adventist Seminary of West Africa (ASWA). The university was officially inaugurated on 20 April 1999.

== Entrepreneurship ==
Babcock University added entrepreneurship and innovation into its academic and professional development initiatives. The initiative organizes programmes aimed at promoting practical business education, innovation and trainings amongst students.

== Notable alumni ==
- Shola Akinlade, CEO and co-founder of Paystack and owner of Sporting Lagos Football Club
- Adenike Akinsemolu, environmental sustainability advocate, educator, author, a social entrepreneur
- Davido, musician and performer
- Debo Ogundoyin, Speaker Oyo State House of Assembly
- Aisha Ochuwa, lawyer and entrepreneur
- Beverly Osu, actress and model
- Olumide Oworu, Nigerian actor
- Olamide Samuel, international security expert
