= Ikoyi =

- Neighbourhood
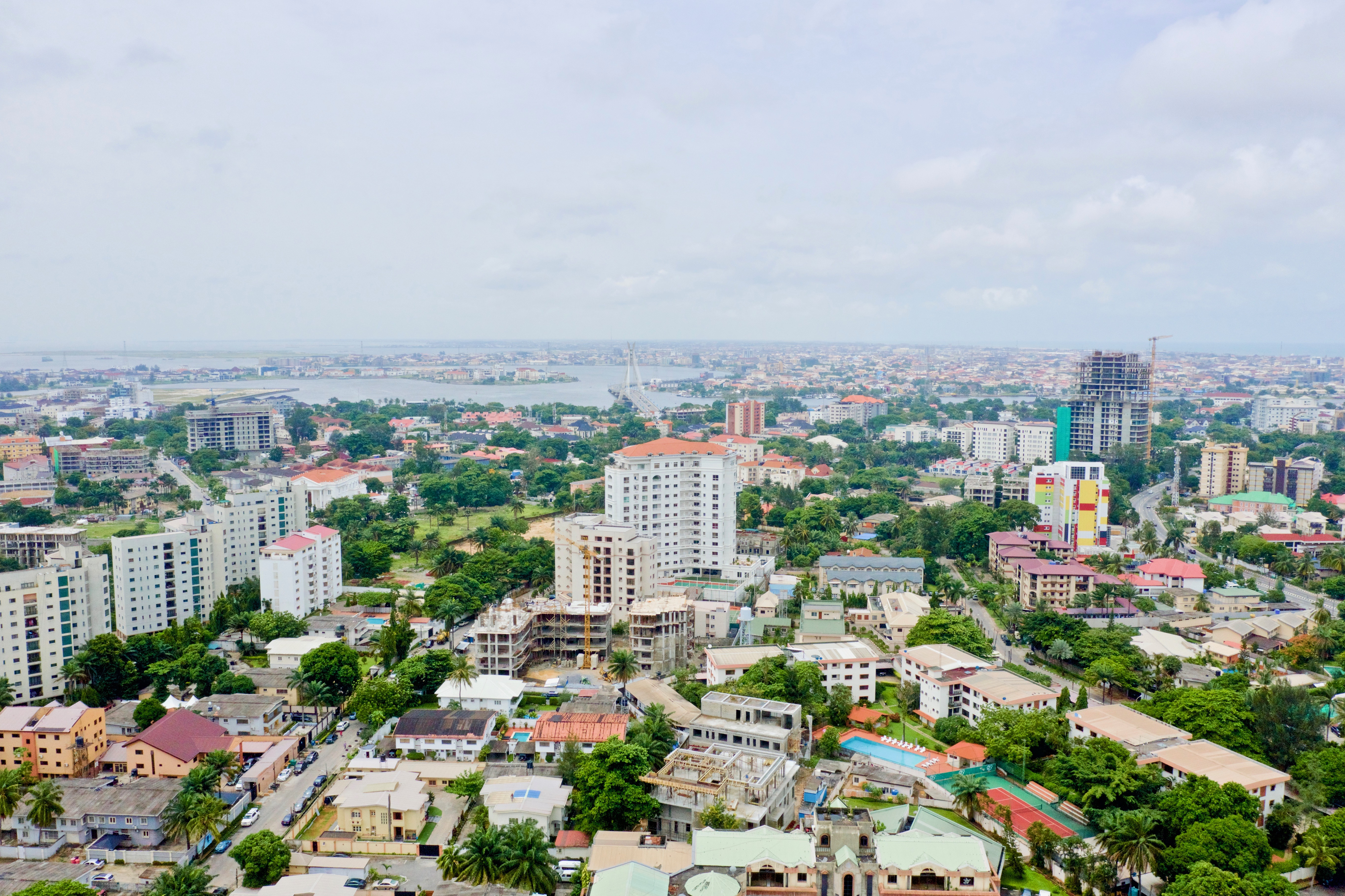
- Ikoyi with Lekki in the background

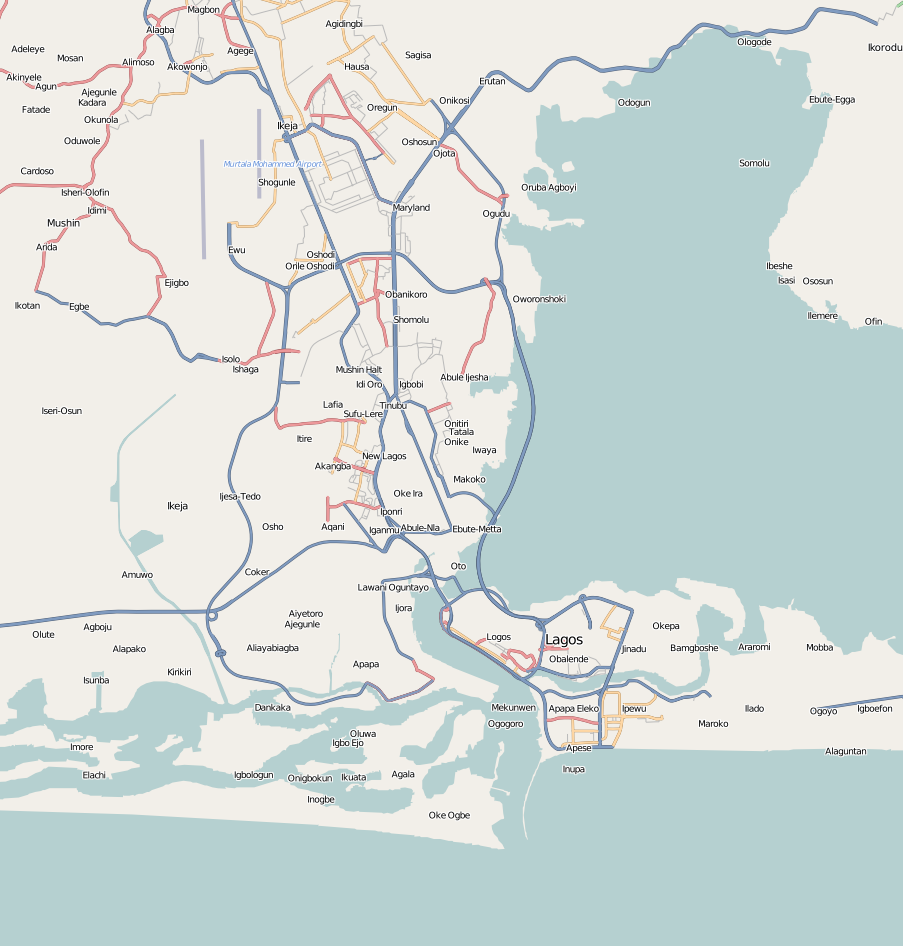
- Location in Lagos
- Coordinates: 6°27′N 3°26′E
- Country: Nigeria
- State: Lagos State
- City: Lagos
- LGA: Eti-Osa
- Time zone: UTC+1 (WAT)
- Climate: Aw

Ikoyi is the most affluent island of Lagos, located in Eti-Osa Local Government Area. It lies to the northeast of Obalende and adjoins Lagos Island to the west, and at the edge of the Lagos Lagoon. Popular with the extreme upper class residents of Nigerian society, Ikoyi is arguably one of the wealthiest communities within Nigeria.

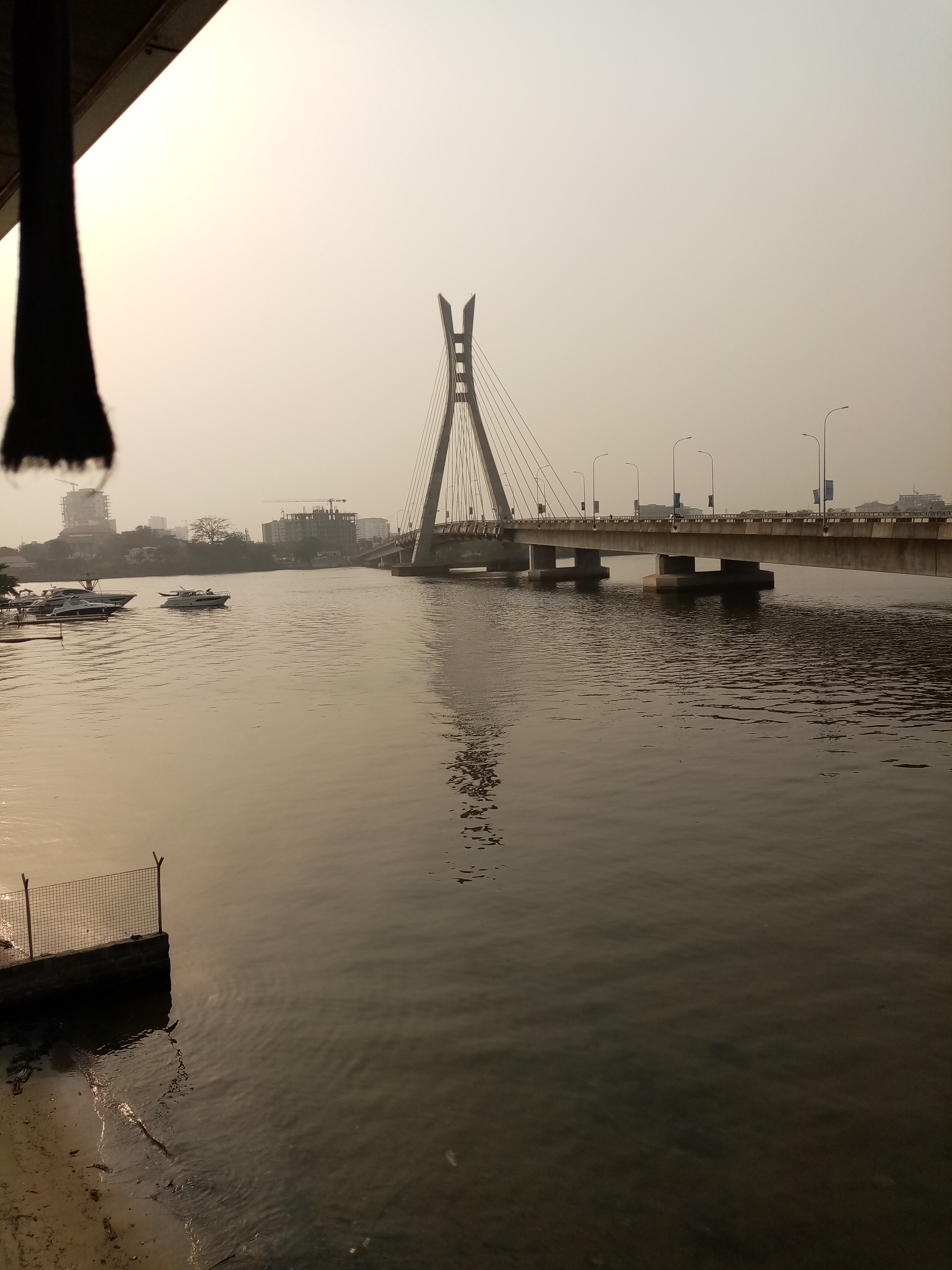

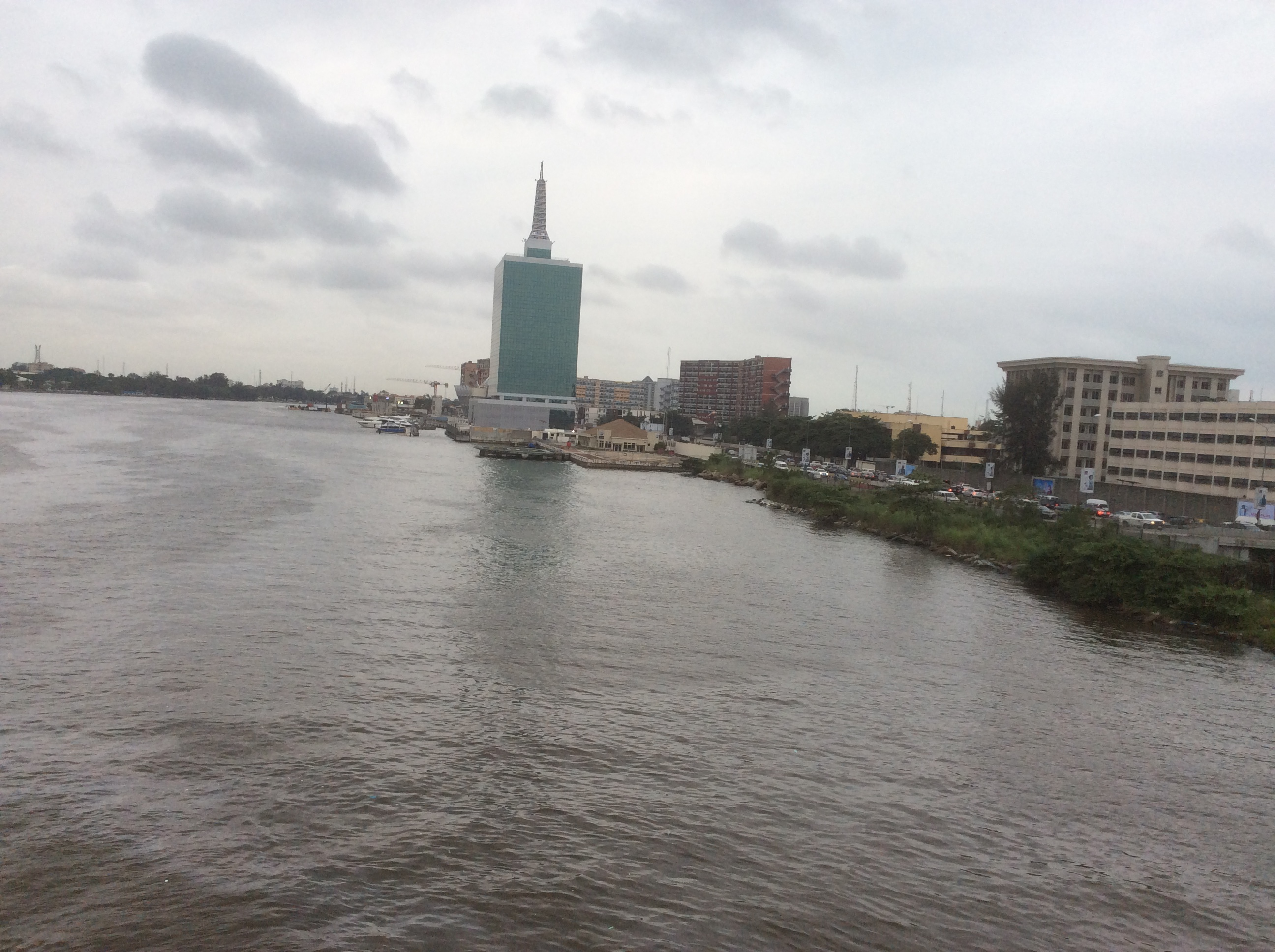

The area that makes up Ikoyi was originally a continuous land mass with Lagos Island, until it was separated from it by the MacGregor canal, a narrow waterway that was dug by the British colonial government. This canal has now been built over or filled in, so that the island is fused with Lagos Island once again. It has been called in derogatory terms the "Beverly Hills by the slum" or the Belgravia of Lagos.

The area is often referred to as Ikoyi I and Ikoyi II. Ikoyi I is typically closer to the original, older part of Ikoyi, which includes some of the most historic and well-established neighbourhoods. Ikoyi I often features more traditional architecture and older buildings, though many have been renovated or repurposed for modern use. This part of Ikoyi might house some of the well-known landmarks and historic sites, like the Ikoyi Club and some of the older colonial-era structure. Ikoyi II generally refers to the newer developments and extensions of the original Ikoyi, sometimes encompassing areas that have seen significant recent growth. Ikoyi II is often characterized by more contemporary developments, high-rise luxury apartments, and new commercial properties. This section might include new shopping complexes, office buildings, and modern infrastructure developments. The primary differences between Ikoyi I and Ikoyi II lie in their location within Ikoyi, the age and style of development, and the type of landmarks or facilities present in each area.

== History ==
During the colonial era, the island was developed as a residential cantonment for the expatriate British community and still retains many of the large colonial residences built between 1900 and 1950.

In the 1920s and 1930s, about 100 ha (250 acres) of land within South West Ikoyi and Obalende were reclaimed and redeveloped. The scheme also led to the redevelopment of a road to connect Onikan with Bourdillon Rd.

Upmarket residential properties continued to be built after the colonial period, and the Island and its Dodan Barracks became the residence of some of Nigeria's military rulers. Ikoyi now contains many other government buildings and businesses, hotels, schools, the famous social club Ikoyi Club, and Ikoyi Golf Club.

== Modern history ==
One of the main attractions in Ikoyi is Awolowo Road, which is a high street lined with upscale shops and boutiques. Due to its proximity to Victoria Island and Lagos Island, much of Lagos's business tourism is centred on Ikoyi, which has a mix of excellent 4-star hotels.

Owing to recent unrest in the Niger Delta, several oil companies have moved their expatriate staff to Ikoyi. The area is now home to several large luxury apartments, estates, and upscale office developments. Lagos Preparatory School (13+), regarded as Africa's most highly accredited British School, is located in Ikoyi.

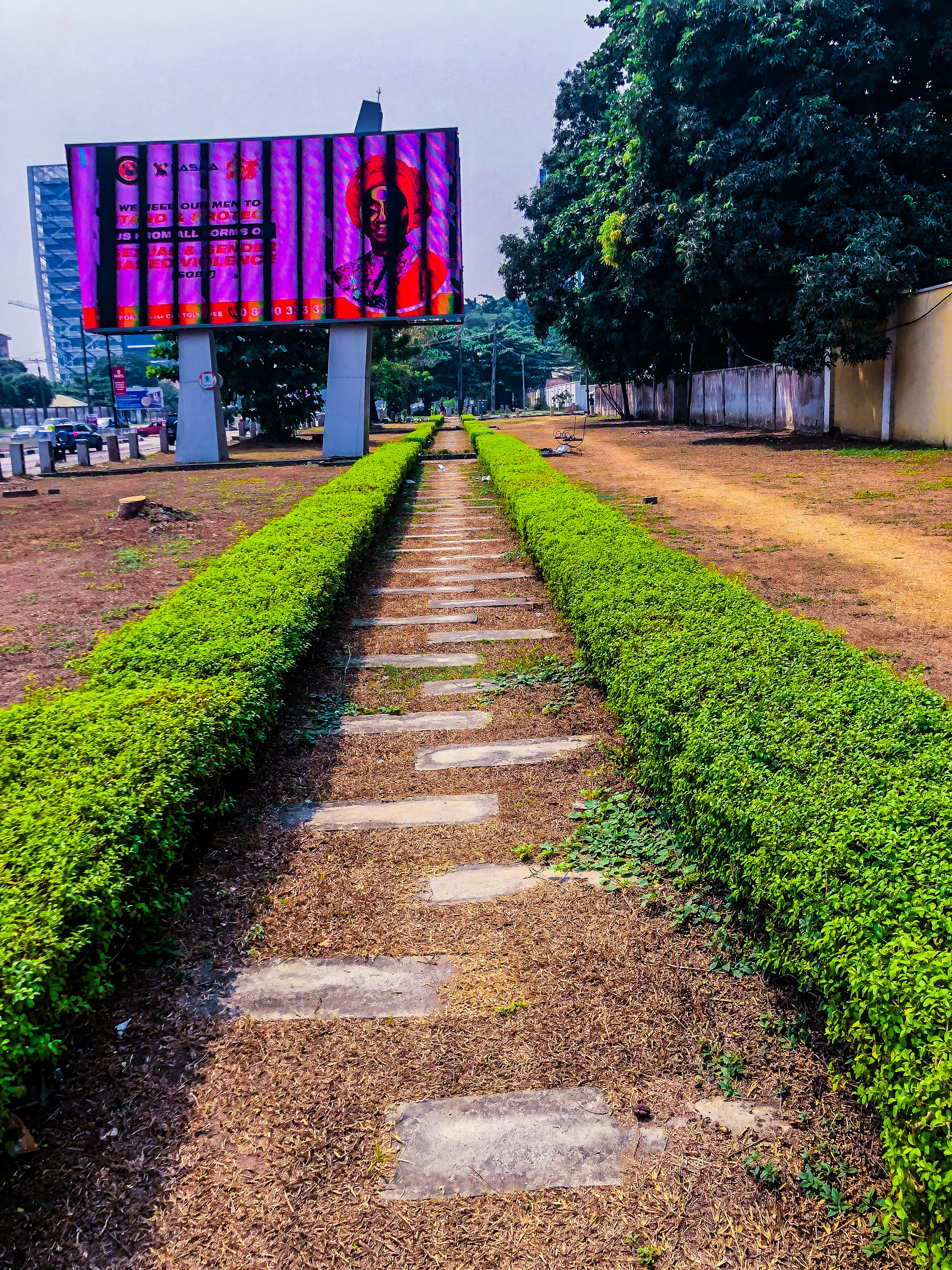
Green Space along Alfred Rewane road

=== November 2021 building collapse ===
On 2 November 2021, a 21-storey building on Gerrard Road collapsed during its construction, killing several workers and the building's owner/developer.

== Economy and sites ==
The Greenhouse Premium City Club, exclusive club home to an outdoor terrace lounge, adult and kids pools, a pool bar, cabanas, indoor sports bar with top chefs.

Google Nigeria is headquartered in Ikoyi.

The Lagos Jet Ski Riders Club, an elite club for the wealthiest of Nigerians is located in Ikoyi.

Ikoyi Golf Club

The Falamo garden.

== Government and infrastructure ==
The National Drug Law Enforcement Agency (NDLEA) is headquartered in Ikoyi.

The World Health Organization (WHO) has its Lagos office in Ikoyi.

The Nigerian Government Presidential Secretariat is headquartered in Ikoyi.

The Deputy-Governor of Lagos State lives in Ikoyi.

All of Nigeria's billionaires maintain property in Ikoyi.

== Climate ==
Ikoyi is one of the regions with the highest amount of rainfall in Lagos, with rain often exceeding 3000 mm (118 in) every year. Flooding is frequent during the rainy season on parts of the major road. Areas such as Dolphin Estates are plagued with chronic flooding.
