= Obalende =

- Neighbourhood
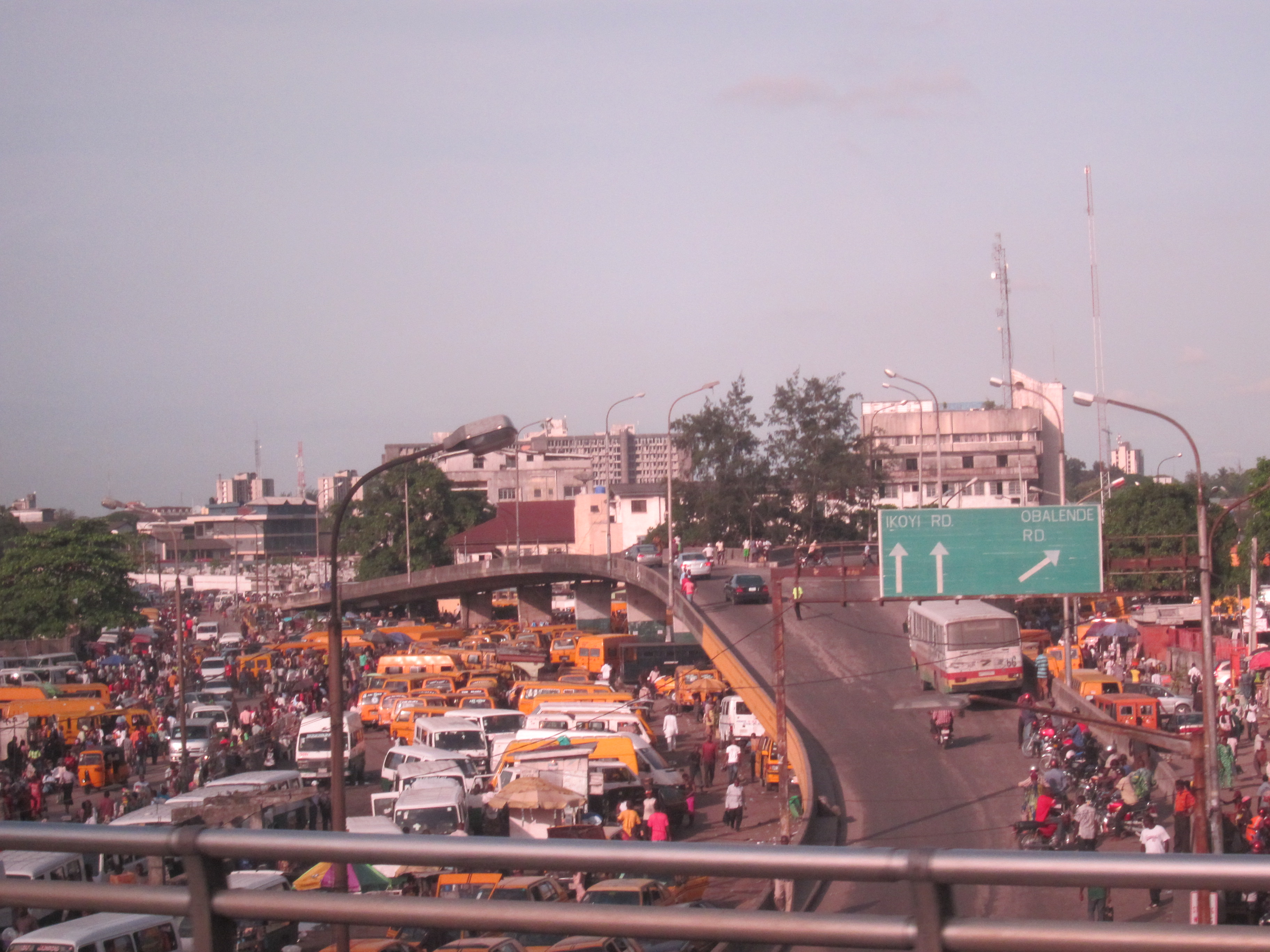
- Road sign for Ikoyi Road and Obalende Road

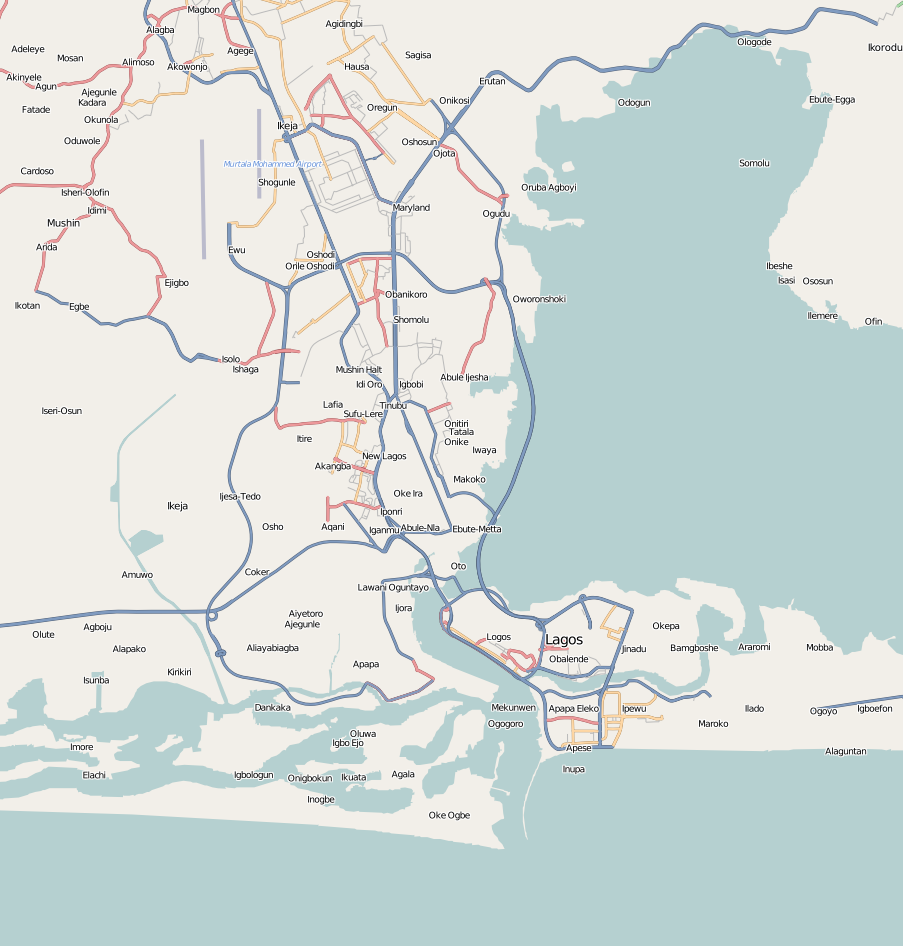
- Location in Lagos
- Coordinates: 6°26′41″N 3°25′3″E
- Country: Nigeria
- State: Lagos State
- City: Lagos
- LGA: Eti-Osa
- Time zone: UTC+1 (WAT)

Obálendé, a contraction of the Yoruba saying Ibi ti Oba le wa de, meaning "Where the king chased us to", is a neighbourhood of Lagos, Nigeria, located in Eti-Osa LGA, close to Lagos Island. Eti-Osa was split by the Lagos State Government into Local Community Development Areas (LCDA) of which Ikoyi–Obalende is one. It contains many schools, including Holy Child College Obalende, St Gregory's College, Aunty Ayo International School and Girls Secondary Grammar School. It is bordered by the police barracks and Army barracks. Obalende is extremely crowded and congested. Obalende is famous for its night life, its red-light district and for its suya with a junction popularly called Suya junction.

== History ==
The Royal West African Frontier Force (RWAFF) made up of predominantly Hausa men were initially camped on the land where King's College, Lagos is situated. Then, a need arose for the use of the land and the Oba of Lagos pressured the Governor of Lagos to resettle the RWAFF men, and sold virgin land in what is now Obalende to the British Colonial Government.

After resettlement in the purchased land, the RWAFF men named the place Ibi ti Ọba lé wà dé, which translated from Yoruba means "the place where the king drove us to".
