= Architecture of Lagos =

Overview of architecture in Lagos, Nigeria

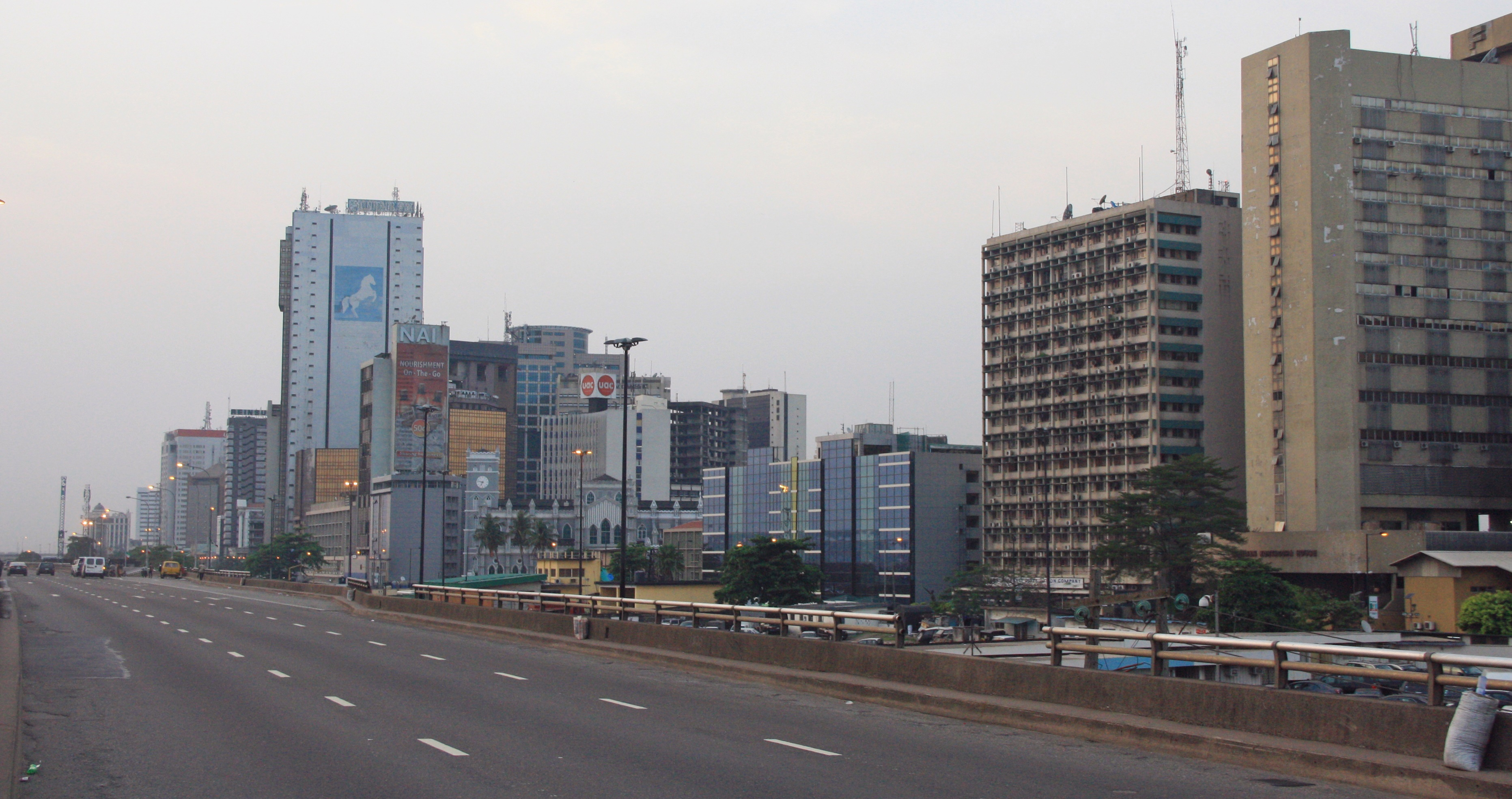
A section near Broad Street, Lagos

The architecture of Lagos is an eclectic mix of different types, styles and periods. Buildings range from traditional vernacular architecture to tropical modern architecture or a mixture. The oldest European-styled buildings date back to the 17th century. Elements of Portuguese architecture introduced by returnee ex-slaves from Brazil and the Caribbean, although present all over the city, predominates in places like: Lagos Island, Surulere and Yaba Municipalities. Colonial-styled architecture flourished during the Lagos Colony. The Lagos skyline is a mixture of modern high rise buildings, skyscrapers, dilapidated buildings and slums. Lagos has the tallest skyline in Nigeria. Skyscraper construction commenced in the 1960s. Several office and mixed-use buildings have been built by international developers and private equity firms. Modern buildings and structures have been a continuous development until date.

== Pre-colonial architecture ==
The pre-colonial architecture of the ancient City of "Eko" ('Warcamp') as Lagos was initially known by its Bini and then Awori colonists was largely of the type that characterised the Yoruba namely: Rectangular houses with central inner court-yards, and in well-planned areas, pot-sherd tiled pavements. The palace of the king slightly differed in style with carved-pillars and a series of inter-connected impluvia present. Earlier Benin influence was evident based on the persistence in coastal areas of round, hip-roofed homes. Both sets of colonists extensively utilized fractals in their architecture as was the widespread practice in Africa at the time.

== Colonial architecture ==
The advent of colonialism in the 1800s was one of the key factors in the drastic, irreversible alteration of 'indigenous' Lagosian architecture. The desire of the English Crown for inexpensive colonialism in humid, tropical West Africa, coupled with the construction of the C.M.S building in Badagry by European missionaries set the precedent for the mass importation of cheap building materials, in particular: Cement, and corrugated iron sheeting. These two materials continue to dominate the building industry to the present day. From the British standpoint, adobe structures were out of the question, so standard colonial-issue tropical houses characterized by deep verandahs, overhanging eaves and classical forms were introduced particularly in planned European quarters like the central areas of Yaba, Surulere and Lagos island. This inevitably led to emulation by the resident natives who immediately took to the foreign building materials to indicate their progressiveness. The other significant factor that impacted upon Lagos's architectural landscape was the slave abolition act, passed on 25 May 1807, which saw the repatriation of thousands of Yoruba ex-slaves and freemen (known as Agudas from Cuba or Saros from Brazil) from all over the Americas but particularly Brazil, and Cuba to the country of their roots. Most of these were skilled artisans and masons and brought with them a much grander style of architecture: Brazilian Baroque architecture and sobrado styles. This style incorporated mostly Portuguese architecture with a few trademark motifs of their own like floral motifs and chunky concrete columns. The refinement of Brazilian Baroque quickly found it acceptance among the local elite who before long, made Afro-Brazilian architects much in demand. Many of these buildings have since been pulled down to make room for newer building projects and calls for conservation have not been heeded by authorities. Examples of Brazilian Baroque include Ilojo Bar, Lagos island, which was designed in 1856 by Afro-Brazilian architect Victor Olaiya and Shitta-Bey mosque with its Ottoman influences by João Baptista Da Costa in 1894. These homes are now mostly historical museums.

== Post-Colonial ==
Post-colonial architecture in Lagos is a preponderance of imported motifs, regional trendism, and differing architectural ideals. The trendy nature of Lagosians has resulted in the accumulation of different building styles over the years. Of these, the most dominant strain is the post-modernist style. According to Pruncal-Ogunsote; "It usually explores simple geometrical forms but often with exposed parapet walls. Characteristic is the use of concrete external walls supplemented by concrete, steel or aluminum sun shading devices (Senate Building at ABU Zaria, Management House in Lagos, CSS Bookshop House in Lagos). This style is well represented by the structures created by architects of the older generation who were trained abroad in modern ideas such as Low-trop buildings for the sprawling masses, although the influential John Godwin (GHK Architects), was a notable exception to this."

In recent years, however, Afromodernism as a movement has been gaining traction particularly amongst the younger generation of architects and it is not unusual in the present day to stumble across seemingly post-modernist architecture with an African twist a la Sterling Bank, Jakande.

== Notable buildings ==
- Iga Idunganran
- Ilojo Bar
- Jaekel House
- Water House
- National Arts Theatre
- National Stadium
- Bookshop House
- Independence House
- NECOM House
- City Hall, Lagos
- St. Nicholas Building
- Federal Palace Hotel
- Union Bank Building
- Eko Hotels and Suites
- Tejuosho Market
- Ikeja City Mall
- The Wings Towers
- Shitta-Bey Mosque
- Cathedral Church of Christ, Lagos
- Heritage Place
- Nestoil Tower
- Presidential Lodge
- 4 Bourdillon
- Kingsway Tower
