= Architecture of Nigeria =

Architecture of Nigeria was historically influenced by environmental conditions as well as social and cultural factors. The coming of missionaries and political changes brought about by colonialism precipitated a change in architectural style and utility of buildings. A Gothic revival style was adopted for early churches built in the colony of Lagos. A one or two-storey timber house building made with pre-fabricated material components and designed with the influence of classic antiquity styles served as mission house for the missionaries. Colonial residents working for the Public Works Department introduced a variant of neoclassical architecture to designs of government buildings and private residencies.

In the local living space, African returnees influenced the adoption of a Brazilian type of building that was to later spread to other parts of the country.

Beginning in the 1970s, a multiplicity of architectural styles were adopted but the influence of the earlier styles is still significant as good number of structures are modified designs of Brazilian type and colonial neoclassical architecture.

- List of palaces in Nigeria

== Traditional architecture ==
=== Hausa architecture ===
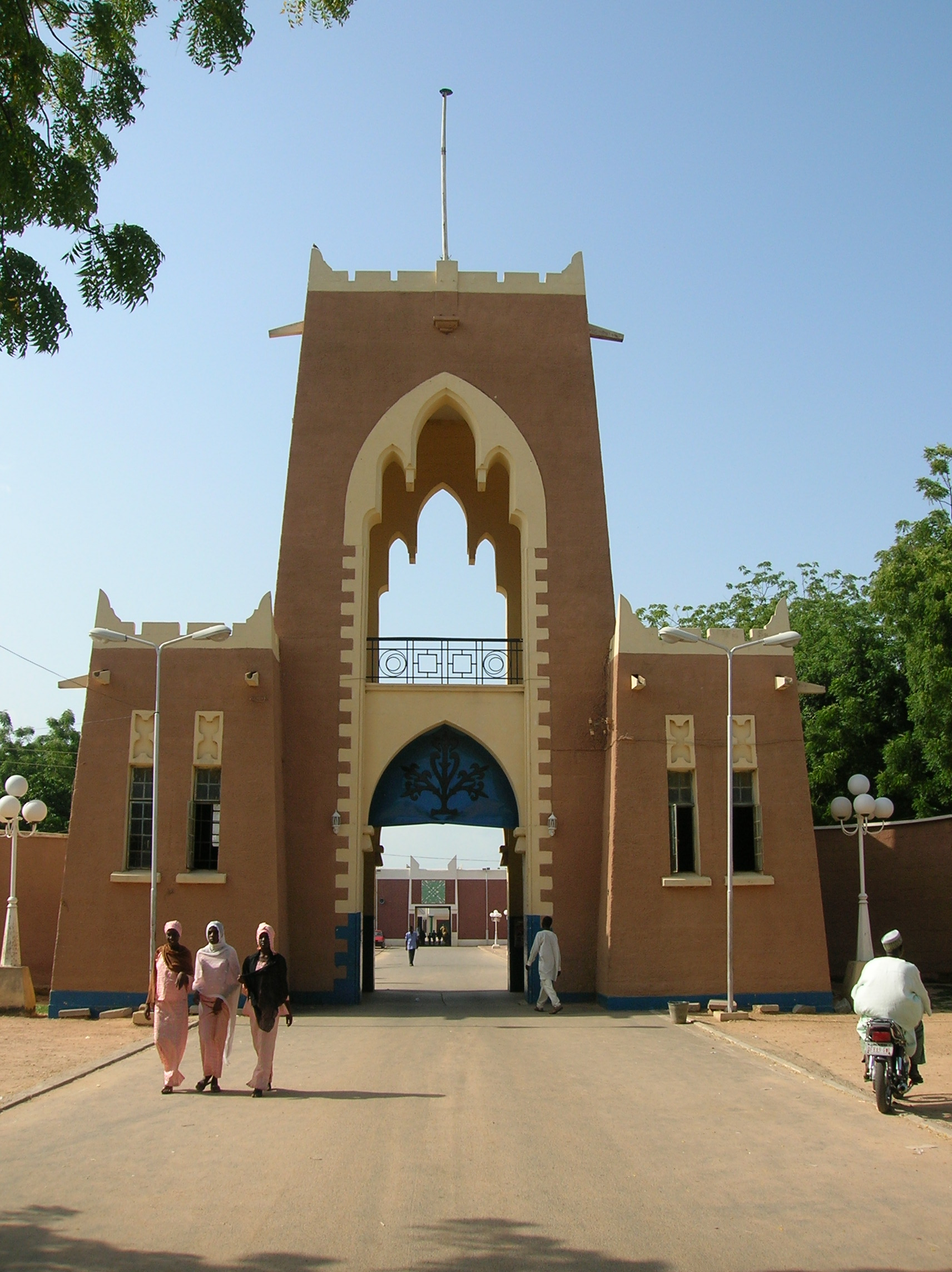
Gidan Rumfa in Kano.

The Hausa people predominantly dwell in the humid Sahel and Savannah zones of Central West Africa up to the southern boundary of the Sahara. Pre-colonial Hausa architecture found in Hausaland was influenced by cultural and environmental elements as dwellings were constructed from earthy and vegetation materials found in the surroundings, the materials are then used to build structures accommodating extended family members. Such materials include bricks moulded from red laterite soil that forms the cornerstone of walls and roofs. These houses have a cubic form, and are considered part of the Sudanese architectural style. In Hausa culture, a housing unit is more appropriately considered a compound, as it consist of structures hosting a man and his wife or wives and their children, or also include the nuclear family of their adult children and in some situations, descendants of a common male ancestor. The structures within the compound are curvilinear and conical in shape. The advent of Islam and the practice of women seclusion in the region enhanced the importance of the compound style, as multiple wives live in built spaces that allows the most privacy. The compound usually has an entrance called Zaure that can also act as a space for craft making and meeting visitors. Some traditional dwellings are decorated with ornaments showing layers of different colors, buildings can also be decorated by molding mud into certain symbols to be plastered to the wall.

The importance of religion in Hausa culture also fueled the building of unique structures in the traditional style such as the old Zaria mosque with moulded mud vaults and domes.

=== Igbo architecture ===
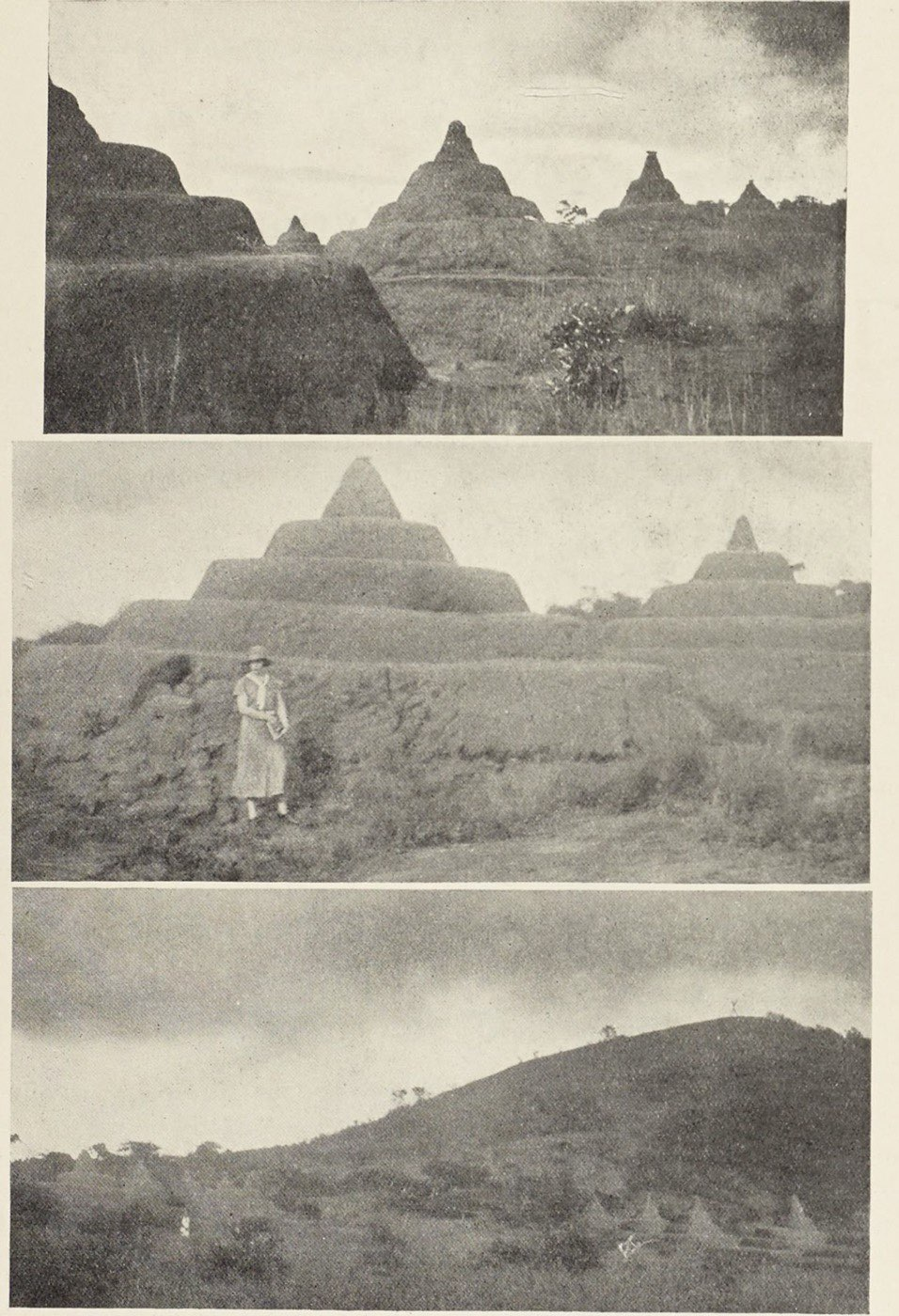
Nsude pyramids in 1935.

Architectural building types in Igboland vary but range from oblong, and square to rectangular and circular shapes. Characteristics of igbo architecture includes Compounds, Wall/fence and Moats, Thatched Buildings, Verandas, Courtyards, Decorative motifs. Depending on the area impluviums were also a common theme, especially around the Anambra area. Compounds in Igbo spatial organizations are very important and can vary depending on the status of the owner. Compounds are built with solid clay/laterite soil and surrounded by a compound wall, or fence. Some compound fences were also built to include moats or trenches for protective purposes. A traditional chief's home sometimes consists of a tower measuring up to thirty feet or more. Personal treasures were sometimes stored in the tower while also serving as a sleeping room. Towers were also used for defensive purposes. These compounds were also sometimes paved using generally flat stones. Thatched Buildings in these enclosures sometimes are supported by large wooden columns from tree trunks. Because of the replant properties against insects in cow pats and the repellent properties in plants such as nchu anwu (i.e. meaning in Igbo "repellent against mosquitoes") which were also occasionally planted in compounds were used in these buildings to repel mosquitoes or other Insects. The furnishments of these architectural structures includes mats which were used to furnish and cover the walls and were also used as carpets for the floors. Mats were also used as beddings on raised bed platforms other beddings used include calico or muslin and skins of spongy trees such as plantain trees etc. logs of woods are also carved and used in making seats and benches for the furnishing of these buildings. These wooden household items of furniture are sometimes perfumed to accommodate visitors.

Depending on the area Igbo architecture in terms of town organization includes typically a settlement pattern consisting of loose clusters of homesteads varyingly arranged along wide cleared paths. These pathways often led to a central meeting place of the town or clan group, which sometimes contained the shrines/temples or sacred grove of the local earth deity or other native spirits. The maintenance of these structures were often done in a communal effort, with specific cultural practices and traditions guiding the upkeep of the structures. In certain Igbo areas, maintenance responsibilities were organized by age grades. In general, there are usually about five age grades in each town. The younger age grades were guided to be responsible for maintaining the pathways and Town square. The older age grades are responsible for the construction of markets and bridges, as well as the executive and legislative aspects and defense systems of the town or community.

=== Yoruba architecture ===
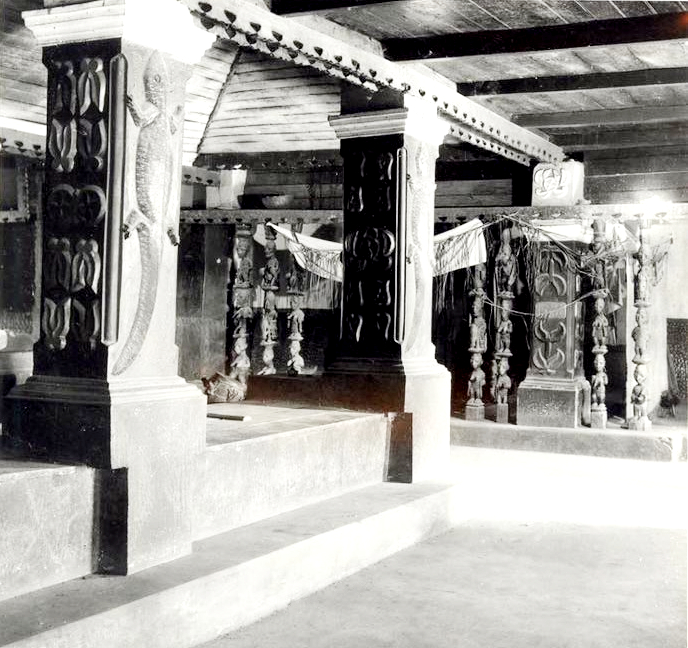
The interior of a building in Ode Ondo, capital of the Ondo Kingdom.

Pre-colonial Yoruba people predominantly live in urban clusters that ends up forming a circular pattern. The palace (afin) of the King and an open market are located at the center of the town, while families live in structures that were built to enclose an open courtyard. An hierarchy of sort is developed within towns whereby the afin or palace is the largest compound and has the most courtyards in the city. Trailing behind are the dwellings of ward or lineage chiefs which typically have more than one courtyard and then followed by the houses of elders of families.

Traditional Yoruba architectural forms can be seen as hollow squares or circles and a unit can be viewed as a compound consisting of various sub units arranged in a quad shape that surrounds an open courtyard, the open space serves as the point of social contact and also used for cooking and craft making. The open spaces or courtyards are designed to be much larger so as to encourage communication between family members while the intimate spaces are much smaller and darker and mostly used for sleeping. Materials used for building the houses are moulded mud obtained from laterite soils, these are the main material for building walls and the houses are built without windows. Roofing materials are influenced by environmental conditions, in areas close to the Atlantic coast, raffia palm leaves are the main materials for roofing while in the northern regions, wood is substituted for palm fronds.

The houses of chiefs and the palace of a king (Afin), include extended courtyards for different activities and also have animal murals and carved posts which are also prominent features of the shrines dedicated to Orishas.

== Introduction of the Brazilian and colonial style ==
=== Brazilian architecture ===
Following the British conquest of Lagos, the town grew to become a city with a combination of various people: the indigenous residents of Isale Eko, African returnees from Brazil, Trinidad and Cuba who had crossed the Atlantic twice, European merchants and British colonists, and lastly creoles. Many African returnees from Brazil had trained in masonry and they introduced stuccoed bungalows or storey buildings with arch windows and doorways influenced by the architecture found in Brazil. This style began to dominate the architecture of colonial Lagos especially in Olowogbowo, Popo Aguda, Ebute Metta and Yaba. Apprentice trained by the returnees later spread a modified variant to other parts of the country. These Brazilian type of house were built with open spaces between the top of the walls and the roof, a front or back veranda or both, alcoves, and garrets at the roof top for aeration. The shape of a two-storey sobrado are quadrangular with a central area that host an alcove, chapel, staircase and or with a passageway. An Italian man from Sardinia established a brick and tile making facility which led to many residents building affordable storey houses made from brick. The brick columns and walls are plastered with ornamentation, and further embellishments were incorporated into plinths, columns and shafts and bases.

Stately houses were built and reproduced in different sizes in Lagos by the returnees, Andrew Thomas residence was a two-storey house of the Brazilian style with ornate plaster works, Joaquim Devonde Branco's brickhouse with wrought iron windows and Caxton House on Marina had a two-storey main building, two showrooms at each side of the main building, horse stables and a garden.

=== Colonial style ===
The earliest form of Colonial architecture present in Lagos were the mission houses housing missionaries that were built from timber and pre-fabricated materials imported from England while the early missionary churches introduced Gothic revival architecture that is witnessed in the designs of the Bethel Cathedral on Broad Street, Christ Church Cathedral, Lagos and St Paul's, Breadfruit, Lagos.

The advent of colonialism led to the construction of structures to host public events and the bureaucracy. Between 1860 and 1870, the Marina was extended and behind it, Broad street was developed. Colonial officials working for the Public Works Department constructed general hospitals, barracks, court houses, post offices, and other government offices largely in a Neoclassical architectural style such as the Supreme Court building that was erected at Tinubu square in 1904. The State House and Old secretariat on Marina were also built in this style with its symmetry of the facade and huge columns and portico.

In terms of housing, British officials lived in secluded government reservations areas or GRA's hosting large houses made from prefabricated components and having expansive compounds, deep verandahs, overhanging windows and a living room space extending to the open verandah.

== Post-colonial ==
=== Tropical modernism of the 1950s and 1960s ===
A planned effort by the governments in Lagos and the regions to introduce tall and modern buildings began to emerge in the years after the end of World War II. At the same time, European architects working in West Africa began to think of innovative ways to create modern designs that takes into consideration the tropical climate. Fry and Drew's University of Ibadan, Kenneth Dike library was one of the early buildings to incorporate environmental designs solving climatic problems in their works. Apart from functional comfort, consideration was given to cross ventilation and shade, in addition, a large concrete grille and fly gauze was incorporated to protect from heat and insect. These style was later adapted in many parts of the country and within West Africa. In addition, modern architects adopted African handicrafts, mosaic and murals as ornament to structures.

Along Marina and Broad street in 1950s Lagos, older two storey houses and hotels gave way to skyscrapers built with concrete, steel and glass and influenced by modern architectural styles. At Marina, National House, later renamed Shell House was designed by Philip Cranswick, and on Broad Street was Cooperative bank building designed by Fry, Drew and Partners, these two were the earliest tall modern buildings in Lagos. During the independence era, more large and tall buildings were constructed in Lagos, this included Elder Dempster House designed by James Cubitt, NPA headquarters and New Niger house both designed by Watkins Grey and Partners. In the 1960s, the 25 storeys independence House designed built by G. Cappa and Western house with 19 storeys, built by Cappa and D'alberto dominated the skyline of the Marina.

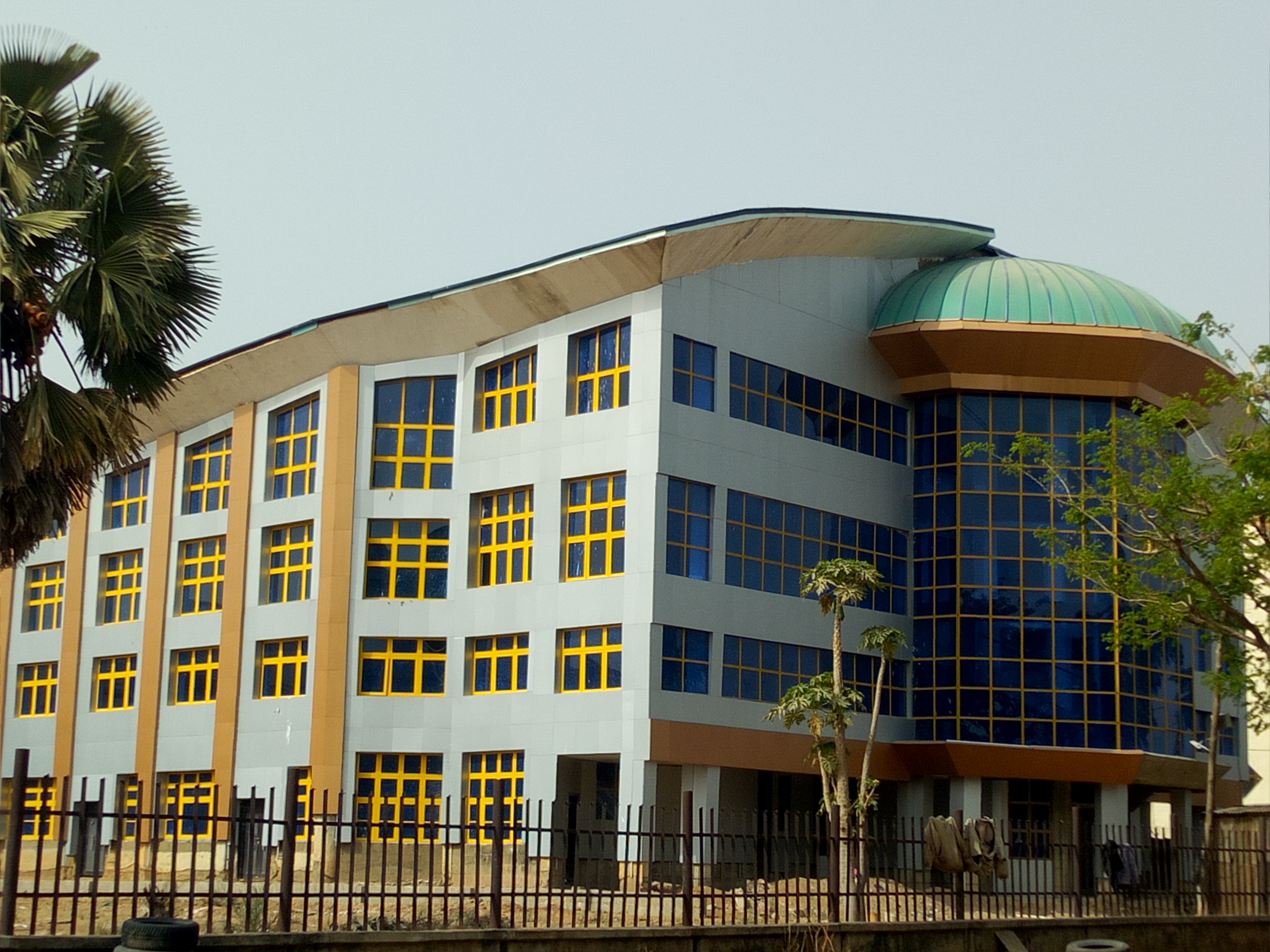
A hall in Kaduna's Mogadishu layout

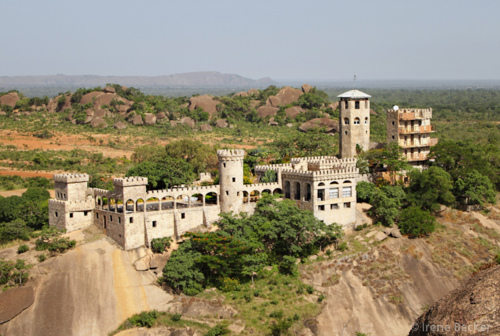
A complex in Kajuru, Kaduna State

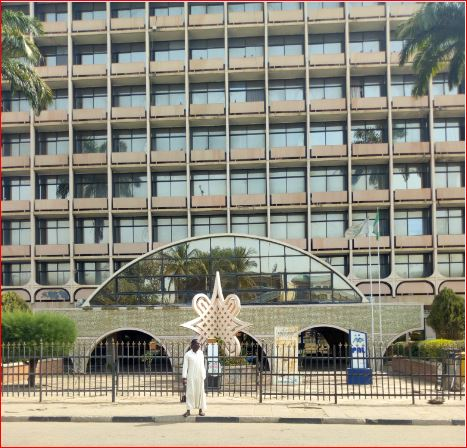
A ten storey building in Kaduna state

== See also ==
- Architecture of Lagos
