= List of Cagliari Calcio seasons =

Cagliari Calcio is an Italian professional football club based in Cagliari, Sardinia, who play their matches in Stadio Sant'Elia. The club was formed in 1920, and joined the Italian league in 1930. Before that time they played regional competitions in the South and Sardinia.

The club has won one Serie A title. They also won the Serie B once and Serie C four times.

This list details the club's achievements in major competitions, and the top scorers for each season. Records of local or regional competitions are not included due to them being considered of less importance.

== Key ==
- Pld = Matches played
- W = Matches won
- D = Matches drawn
- L = Matches lost
- GF = Goals for
- GA = Goals against
- Pts = Points
- Pos = Final position
- Serie A = 1st Tier in Italian League
- Serie B = 2nd Tier in Italian League
- Serie C = 3rd Tier in Italian League
- Prima Categoria = 1st Tier until 1922
- Promozione = 2nd Tier until 1922
- Prima Divisione = 1st Tier until 1926
- Prima Divisione = 2nd Tier (1926–1929)
- Seconda Divisione = 2nd Tier until 1926
- Seconda Divisione = 3rd Tier (1926–1929)
- Divisione Nazionale = 1st Tier (1926–1929)
- F = Final
- SF = Semi-finals
- QF = Quarter-finals
- R16 = Last 16
- R32 = Last 32
- QR1 = First Qualifying Round
- QR2 = Second Qualifying Round
- QR3 = Third Qualifying Round
- PO = Play-Offs
- 1R = Round 1
- 2R = Round 2
- 3R = Round 3
- GS = Group Stage
- 2GS = Second Group Stage
- EC = European Cup (1955–1992)
- UCL = UEFA Champions League (1993–present)
- CWC = UEFA Cup Winners' Cup (1960–1999)
- UC = UEFA Cup (1971–2008)
- UEL = UEFA Europa League (2009–present)
- USC = UEFA Super Cup
- INT = Intercontinental Cup (1960–2004)
- WC = FIFA Club World Cup (2005–present)

Champions	Runners-up	Promoted	Relegated	1st Tier	2nd Tier	3rd Tier	4th Tier	5th Tier

== Seasons ==
Results of league and cup competitions by season
Season	Division	Pld	W	D	L	GF	GA	Pts	Pos	Coppa Italia	Supercoppa Italiana	Cup	Result	Player(s)	Goals
Season	League									Coppa Italia	Supercoppa Italiana	UEFA – FIFA		Top goalscorer(s)	
1928–29	Campionato Meridionale A (4); Semifinali A	22; 6	17; 1	2; 1	3; 4	58; 3	16; 8	4; 3	1st 4th					n/a	
1929–30	Prima Divisione D (3)	28	14	6	8	47	23	34	5th					n/a	
1930–31	Prima Divisione F (3); Finali Sud	22; 2	15; 1	5; 1	2; 0	50; 3	16; 2	35; 3	1st 1st					n/a	
1931–32	Serie B (2)	34	12	8	14	41	38	32	13th					Rodolfo Ostromann	11
1932–33	Serie B (2)	32	9	6	17	37	60	24	14th					Domenico D'Alberto; Tonino Fradelloni	9
1933–34	Serie B Girone A (2)	24	6	3	15	22	61	14	12th					Ernesto Zambianchi	8
1934–35	Serie B Girone A (2)	29	12	6	11	45	40	30	9th					Otello Subinaghi	14
1935–36	Seconda Divisione Sardegna (5)	n/a	n/a	n/a	n/a	n/a	n/a	n/a	1st					n/a	
1936–37	Prima Divisione Sardegna (4)	n/a	n/a	n/a	n/a	n/a	n/a	n/a	1st					n/a	
1937–38	Serie C Girone E (3)	24	2	4	18	18	54	8	13th	1R				n/a	
1938–39	Serie C Girone F (3)	24	10	3	11	44	35	23	5th	2R				n/a	
1939–40	Serie C Girone F (3)	27	13	5	9	57	38	31	6th	2R				n/a	
1940–41	Prima Divisione Sardegna (4)	n/a	n/a	n/a	n/a	n/a	n/a	n/a	n/a					n/a	
1941–42	Prima Divisione Sardegna (4)	12	3	1	8	13	18	7	6th					n/a	
1942–43	Prima Divisione Sardegna (4)	4	1	1	2	n/a	n/a	3	5th					n/a	
1943–44	Regional Competition													n/a	
1944–45	Prima Divisione Sardegna (4)								1st					n/a	
1945–46	Prima Divisione Sardegna (4)								1st					n/a	
1946–47	Prima Divisione Sardegna (4)								3rd					n/a	
1947–48	Serie B Girone A (2)	34	7	4	23	32	79	18	18th					Antonio Ragazzo	11
1948–49	Serie C Girone C (3)	40	13	10	17	48	60	36	15th					n/a	
1949–50	Serie C Girone C (3)	40	19	7	14	67	56	45	6th					n/a	
1950–51	Serie C Girone C (3)	38	15	13	10	59	45	43	5th					n/a	
1951–52	Serie C Girone C (3); Gironi Finali	34; 6	22; 5	8; 1	4; 0	75; 12	24; 5	52; 11	1st 1st					Erminio Bercarich	30
1952–53	Serie B (2)	34	14	10	10	51	44	38	4th					Erminio Bercarich	12
1953–54	Serie B (2)	34	16	9	9	42	30	41	3rd					Giancarlo Mezzalira	8
1954–55	Serie B (2)	34	10	13	11	33	35	33	9th					Aurelio Santagostino	10
1955–56	Serie B (2)	34	15	10	9	51	45	40	5th					Tullio Ghersetich	16
1956–57	Serie B (2)	34	11	10	13	30	34	32	10th					Tullio Ghersetich	10
1957–58	Serie B (2)	34	8	10	16	31	44	26	17th					Gianni Meanti	8
1958–59	Serie B (2)	38	15	13	10	48	48	43	4th	2R				Carlo Regalia	15
1959–60	Serie B (2)	38	8	15	15	36	54	31	20th	1R				Umberto Serradimigni	7
1960–61	Serie C Girone B (3)	34	19	7	8	48	26	45	2nd					Guerrino Rossi	13
1961–62	Serie C Girone B (3)	34	17	10	7	51	23	44	1st					Danilo Torriglia	13
1962–63	Serie B (2)	38	12	14	12	41	40	38	9th	1R				Danilo Torriglia	11
1963–64	Serie B (2)	38	16	17	5	44	23	49	2nd	3R				Ricciotti Greatti	12
1964–65	Serie A (1)	34	13	8	13	33	35	34	6th	QF				Gigi Riva	12
1965–66	Serie A (1)	34	10	10	14	36	37	30	11th	2R				Gigi Riva	11
1966–67	Serie A (1)	34	13	14	7	35	17	40	6th	1R				Gigi Riva	19
1967–68	Serie A (1)	30	12	7	11	44	38	31	9th	1R				Gigi Riva	13
1968–69	Serie A (1)	30	14	13	3	41	18	41	2nd	RU				Gigi Riva	27
1969–70	Serie A (1)	30	17	11	2	42	11	45	W	3rd				Gigi Riva	27
1970–71	Serie A (1)	30	8	14	8	33	35	30	7th	1R		EC	R16	Gigi Riva; Angelo Domenghini	8
1971–72	Serie A (1)	30	15	9	6	39	23	39	4th	1R				Gigi Riva	21
1972–73	Serie A (1)	30	9	11	10	26	28	29	8th	2R		UC	1R	Gigi Riva	20
1973–74	Serie A (1)	30	7	14	9	25	32	28	10th	1R				Gigi Riva	15
1974–75	Serie A (1)	30	6	14	10	22	30	26	10th	1R				Sergio Gori	15
1975–76	Serie A (1)	30	5	9	16	25	52	19	16th	1R				Gigi Riva; Pietro Paolo Virdis	6
1976–77	Serie B (2)	38	17	15	6	45	32	49	4th	1R				Pietro Paolo Virdis	18
1977–78	Serie B (2)	38	12	13	13	52	47	37	12th	1R				Luigi Piras	12
1978–79	Serie B (2)	38	16	17	5	46	24	49	2nd	QF				Emanuele Gattelli	7
1979–80	Serie A (1)	30	8	14	8	27	29	30	8th	1R				Franco Selvaggi	12
1980–81	Serie A (1)	30	8	14	8	27	29	30	6th	1R				Franco Selvaggi	8
1981–82	Serie A (1)	30	7	11	12	33	36	25	12th	1R				Luigi Piras	10
1982–83	Serie A (1)	30	6	14	10	23	33	26	14th	R16				Luigi Piras	10
1983-84	Serie B (2)	38	10	16	12	31	32	36	11th	1R				Luigi Piras	8
1984–85	Serie B (2)	38	12	10	16	29	32	34	16th	R16				Gianni De Rosa	5
1985–86	Serie B (2)	38	13	9	16	27	38	35	14th	1R				Luigi Piras	8
1986–87	Serie B (2)	38	9	13	16	32	47	26	20th	SF				Luigi Piras; Giampaolo Montesano	7
1987–88	Serie C1 Girone B (3)	34	11	9	14	34	34	31	11th	1R				Guglielmo Coppola	11
1988–89	Serie C1 Girone B (3)	34	16	13	5	37	21	45	1st					Guglielmo Coppola	11
1989–90	Serie B (2)	38	17	13	8	39	22	47	3rd	1R				Fabrizio Provitali	12
1990–91	Serie A (1)	34	6	17	11	29	44	29	14th	2R				Daniel Fonseca	8
1991–92	Serie A (1)	34	7	15	12	30	34	29	13th	1R				Daniel Fonseca	9
1992–93	Serie A (1)	34	14	9	11	45	33	37	6th	R16				Luís Oliveira; Enzo Francescoli	9
1993–94	Serie A (1)	34	10	12	12	39	48	32	12th	2R		UC	SF	Dely Valdés	17
1994–95	Serie A (1)	34	13	10	11	40	39	49	9th	R16				Roberto Muzzi	12
1995–96	Serie A (1)	34	11	8	15	34	47	41	10th	QF				Luís Oliveira	18
1996–97	Serie A (1)	34	9	10	15	45	55	37	15th	R16				Sandro Tovalieri	13
1997–98	Serie B (2)	38	15	18	5	53	36	63	3rd	R32				Roberto Muzzi	19
1998–99	Serie A (1)	34	11	8	15	49	50	41	13th	R32				Roberto Muzzi	18
1999–2000	Serie A (1)	34	3	13	18	29	54	22	17th	SF				Patrick M'Boma	14
2000–01	Serie B (2)	38	12	14	12	53	45	50	11th	GS				David Suazo; Fabrizio Cammarata	14
2001–02	Serie B (2)	38	10	17	11	39	39	47	12th	GS				David Suazo	9
2002–03	Serie B (2)	38	14	12	12	47	46	54	8th	GS				David Suazo; Mauro Esposito	11
2003–04	Serie B (2)	46	23	14	9	80	51	83	2nd	GS				David Suazo	19
2004–05	Serie A (1)	38	10	14	14	51	60	44	12th	SF				Mauro Esposito	19
2005–06	Serie A (1)	38	8	15	15	42	55	39	14th	R16				David Suazo	25
2006–07	Serie A (1)	38	9	13	16	35	46	40	17th	2R				David Suazo	15
2007–08	Serie A (1)	38	11	9	18	40	56	42	14th	R16				Robert Acquafresca	12
2008–09	Serie A (1)	38	15	8	15	49	50	53	9th	4R				Robert Acquafresca	14
2009–10	Serie A (1)	38	11	11	16	56	58	44	16th	3R				Alessandro Matri	13
2010–11	Serie A (1)	38	12	9	17	44	51	45	14th	4R				Alessandro Matri	11
2011–12	Serie A (1)	38	10	13	15	37	46	43	15th	4R				Joaquín Larrivey	10
2012–13	Serie A (1)	38	12	11	15	43	55	47	11th	R16				Marco Sau	12
2013–14	Serie A (1)	38	9	12	17	34	53	39	15th	3R				Mauricio Pinilla	8
2014–15	Serie A (1)	38	8	10	20	48	68	34	18th	R16				Marco Sau	9
2015–16	Serie B (2)	42	25	8	9	78	41	83	1st	R16				Diego Farias	14
2016–17	Serie A (1)	38	14	5	19	55	76	47	11th	4R				Marco Borriello	20
2017–18	Serie A (1)	38	11	6	21	33	61	39	16th	4R				Leonardo Pavoletti	11
2018–19	Serie A (1)	38	10	11	17	36	54	41	15th	R16				Leonardo Pavoletti	14
2019–20	Serie A (1)	38	11	12	15	52	56	45	14th	R16				João Pedro	19
2020–21	Serie A (1)	38	9	10	19	43	59	37	16th	R16				João Pedro	16
2021–22	Serie A (1)	38	6	12	20	34	68	30	18th	R16				João Pedro	13
2022–23	Serie B (2)	38	15	15	8	50	34	60	5th	R32				Gianluca Lapadula	26
2023–24	Serie A (1)	38	8	12	18	42	68	36	16th	R16				Nicolas Viola	6
2024–25	Serie A (1)	38	9	9	20	40	56	36	15th	R16				Roberto Piccoli	7
