= D'Alberto =

D'Alberto is a surname. Notable people with the surname include:

- Anthony D'Alberto (born 1994), Democratic Republic of the Congo footballer
- Domenico D'Alberto (1907–?), Hungarian footballer
- Gianguido D'Alberto (born 1977), Italian politician
- Luca D'Alberto (born 1983), Italian composer
- Tony D'Alberto (born 1985), Australian racing driver

== See also ==
- Cappa & D'Alberto PLC, building and construction company
- Tony D'Alberto Racing, motor racing team
