= Former Jesuit House of Prayer =

- Antiga Casa de Oração dos Jesuítas
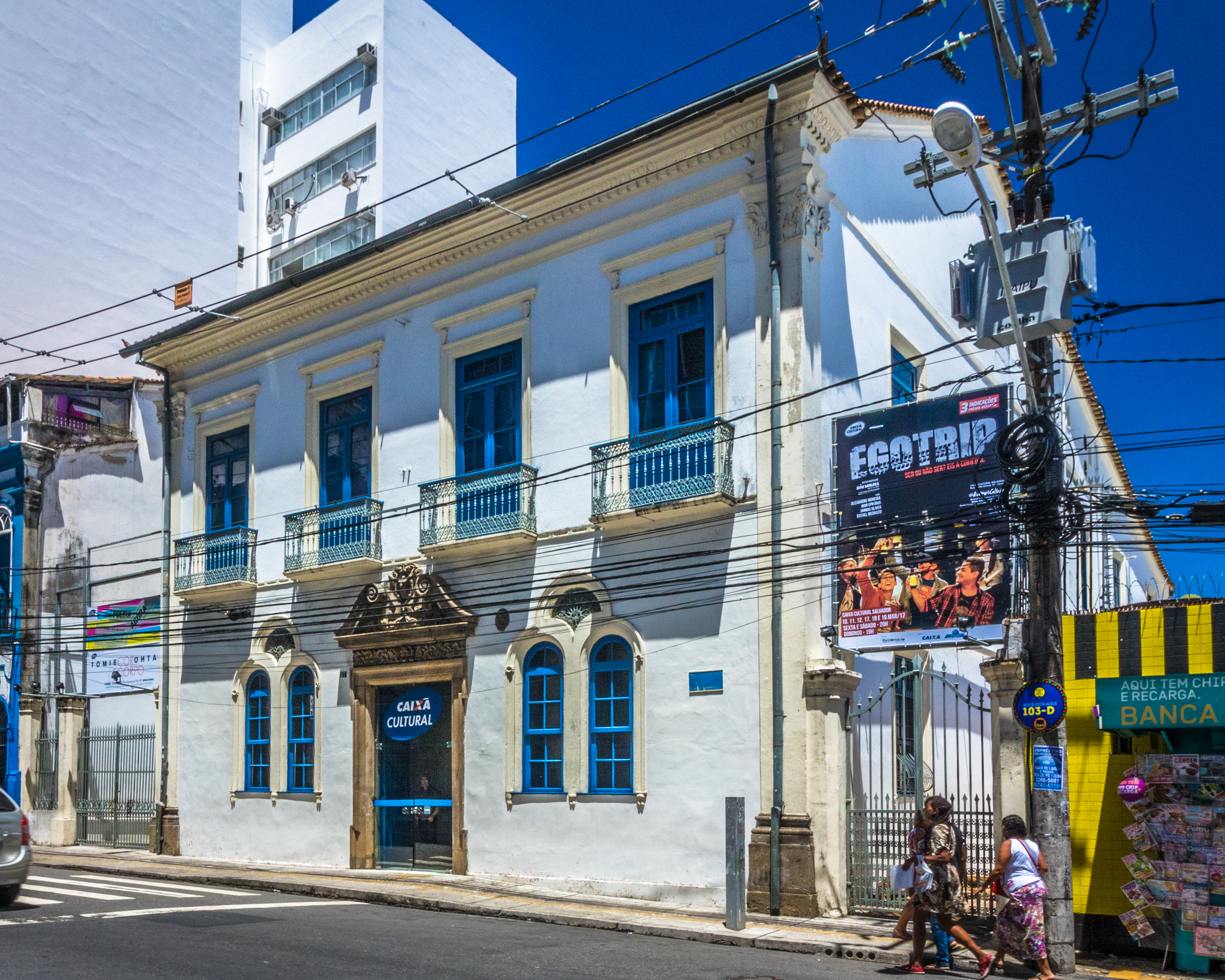
- Former Jesuit House of Prayer, Salvador, Bahia

- Location within Brazil
- Former names: Caixa Cultural Salvador
- Alternative names: House at Rua Carlos Gomes, nº 57

General information
- Location: Rua Carlos Gomes, 57, Centro, Salvador, Bahia, 40060-330, Salvador, Bahia, Brazil
- Coordinates: 12.604312°S 38.961501°W
- Inaugurated: 1696

Technical details
- Floor count: 2

National Historic Heritage of Brazil
- Designated: 1938
- Reference no.: 114

The Former Jesuit House of Prayer (Portuguese: Antiga Casa de Oração dos Jesuítas, also known as the House at Rua Carlos Gomes, nº 57 or Caixa Cultural Salvador) is a former residence and cultural center in Salvador, Bahia, Brazil. The building dates to the late 17th century and first functioned as a Jesuit residence, a private residence after the expulsion of the Jesuits from Brazil, a retirement home, and a cultural center. The house is noted for its ornate, stone portal with an elaborate baroque-style pediment. The house was listed as a historic structure by the National Historic and Artistic Heritage Institute in 1938.

== Location ==
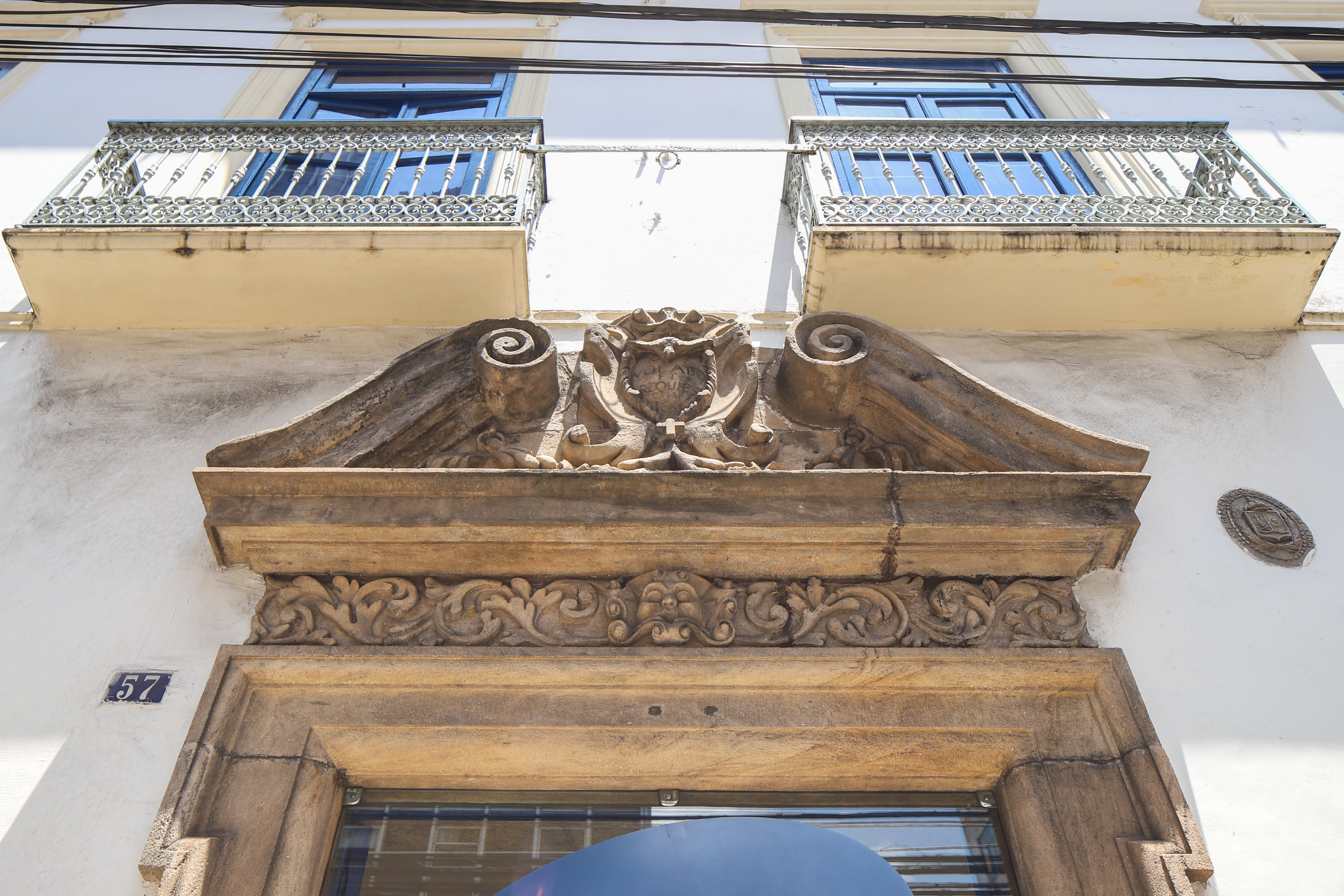
Sandstone pediment of portal

The Former Jesuit House of Prayer was located on the edge of a hillside in an area outside of the historic center of Salvador. It is now on Rua Carlos Gomes, formerly the Caminho de Baixo de São Bento, in a densely urbanized area. It now stands "forgotten among the surrounding commercial buildings."

== History ==
The Jesuit House of Prayer was built on land donated by a benefactor to the society in 1757 to establish a presence of the society in the area. Records refer to the building as the House of Prayer of the Jesuits in 1760. The house was sold to private individuals in 1759 after the expulsion of the Jesuits from Brazil in 1759. It belonged to the Freire de Carvalho family by 1884, then was purchased by Knight Commander Manuel Gomes da Costa. It was the property of Rita da Costa Morais by 1941, when the building was sold to the Santa Casa da Misericórdia. The Santa Casa renovated the house into a retirement home. The building was the headquarters of Diário de Notícias, a Bahian newspaper, between 1945 and 1978. The building then fell into disuse. It was renovated into a cultural center of the Caixa Econômica Federal and reinaugurated in 1999.

== Structure ==
The Former Jesuit House of Prayer is a sobrado, or urban house, of the Portuguese colonial period. It has two floors, a central corridor, attic, and basement. It is now surrounded by dense urbanization and tall buildings that compromise its structural features. It is built on a rectangular floor plan with a central corridor that provides access to both floors. The façade is simple, with two storeys and a portal at center. The portal is framed in stone with an ornate baroque-style pediment with volutes. The pediment is dated 1696. It is similar to other ornate portals in Salvador of the period, notably that of nearby Casa Margarida and Solar Ferrão. The windows on the lower level are in a Venetian style, and date to the late 19th or early 20th century. The flour windows of the upper levels are more traditional, with straight lintels and iron balconets. The interior retains none of its furnishing and little decoration. Two rooms of the upper floor have their original wood panelled ceiling in rosewood.

== Protected status ==
The Former Jesuit House of Prayer was listed as a historic structure by the National Institute of Historic and Artistic Heritage in 1938 under inscription number 114.

== Access ==
The cultural center is open to the public and may be visited.
