= Cuban Lodge =

Historic Afro-Cuban heritage building in Lagos, Nigeria

Cuban Lodge is a building located on Odunlami Street, Lagos Island, Nigeria. Constructed in 1932 by the Afro-Cuban returnee Hilario Campos, the building is associated with the Afro-Cuban community that settled in Lagos during the colonial period.

The building is regarded as a surviving example of Afro-Cuban architectural influence in Lagos and forms part of the cultural heritage associated with Lagos Island’s returnee communities from Latin America and the Caribbean.

== See also ==
- Lagos Island
- Architecture of Lagos
- Afro-Cubans
