= Kings Tower =

Kings Tower may refer to:

- Kings Tower, Sheffield, England
- Kings Tower, Lagos, Nigeria
