= Jaekel House =

Colonial mansion in Nigeria; now a cultural and historical site

- Interactive map of the Jaekel House area

General information
- Type: residential
- Architectural style: British colonial architecture
- Location: Ebute Metta, 17, Federal Road, Lagos, Nigeria
- Coordinates: 6.4890°N 3.3783°E
- Completed: 1898
- Renovated: 2010

Technical details
- Floor count: 2

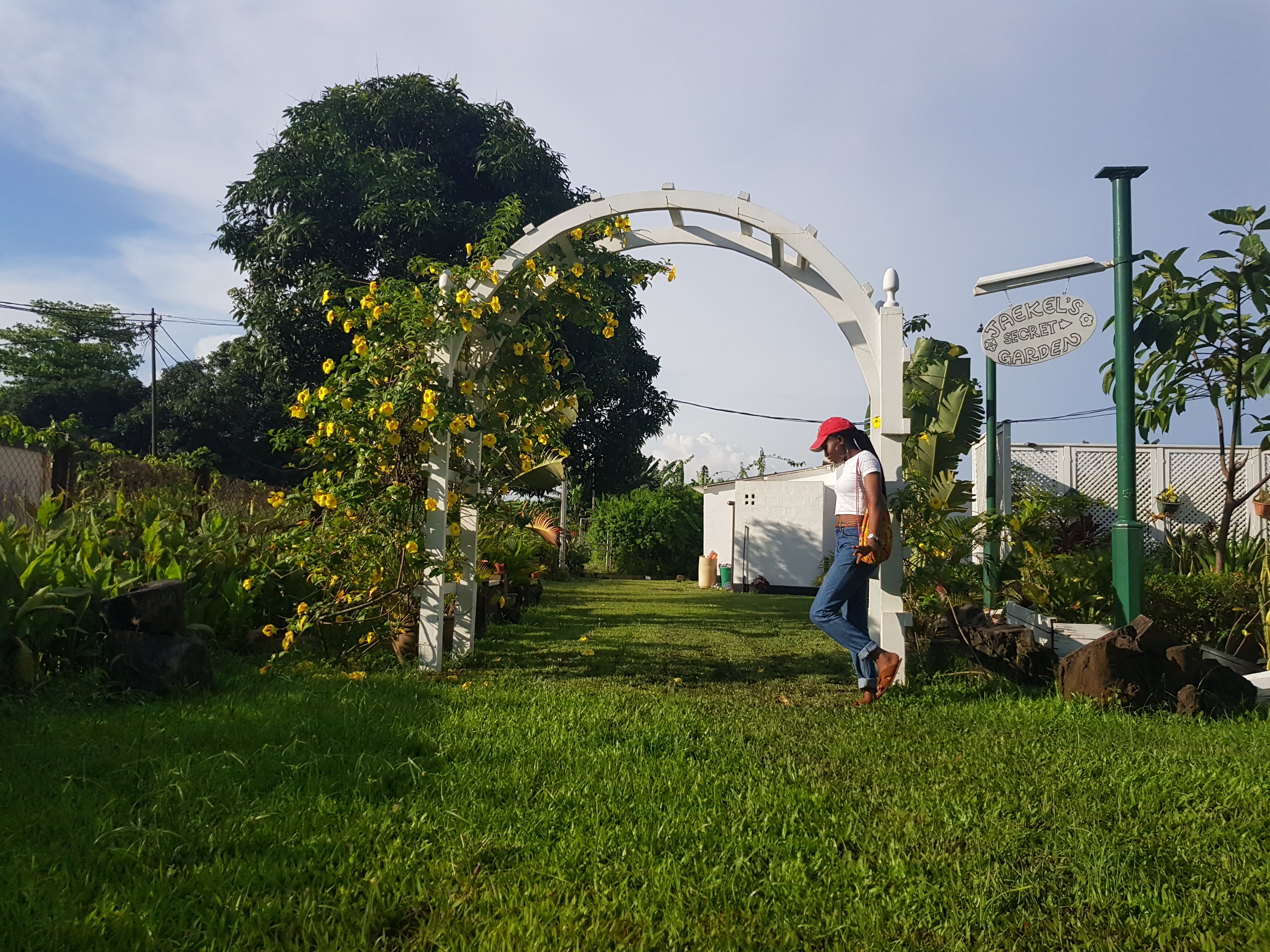
vegetation at jaekel house, lagos state

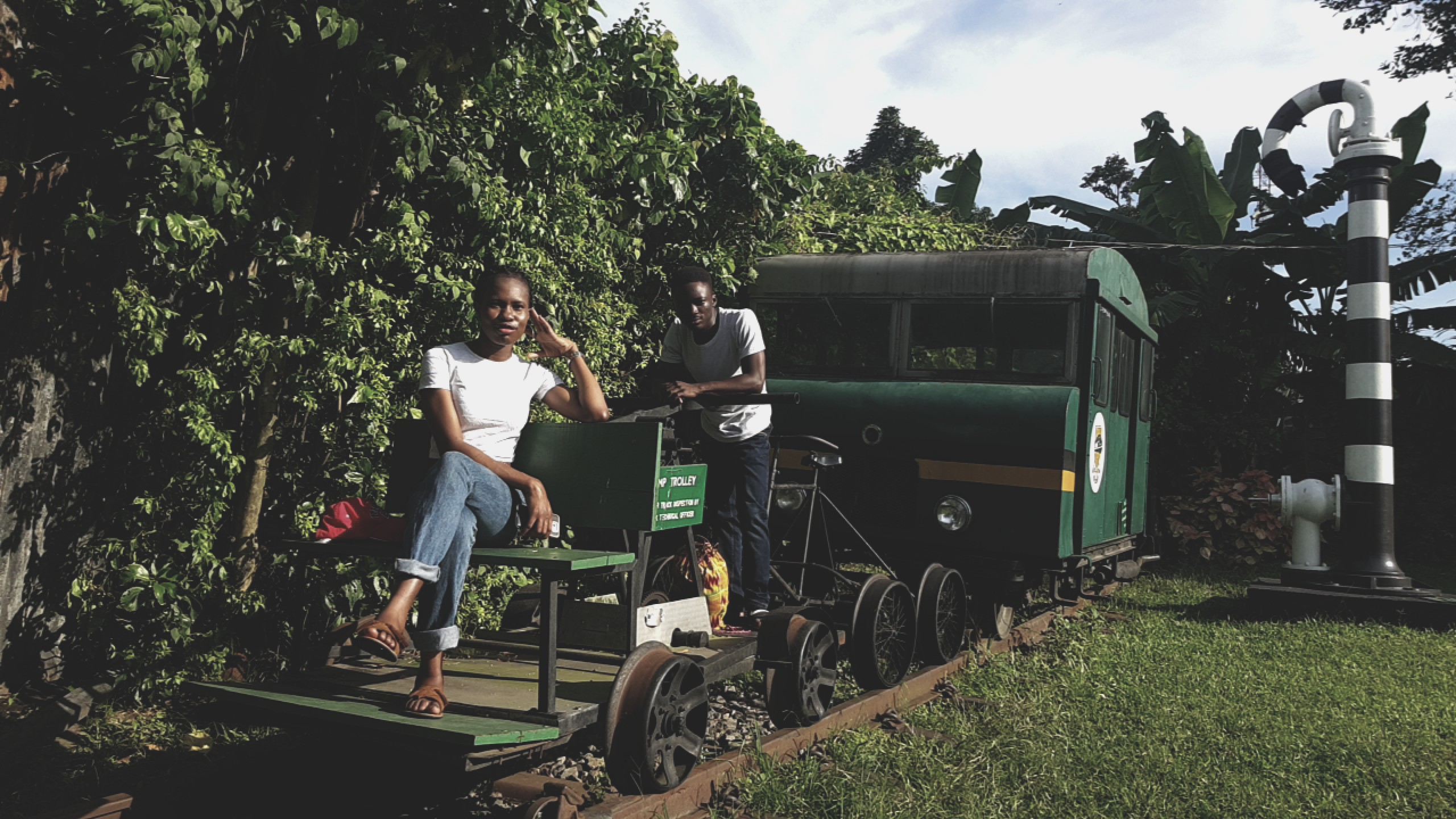
tourists in jaekel house

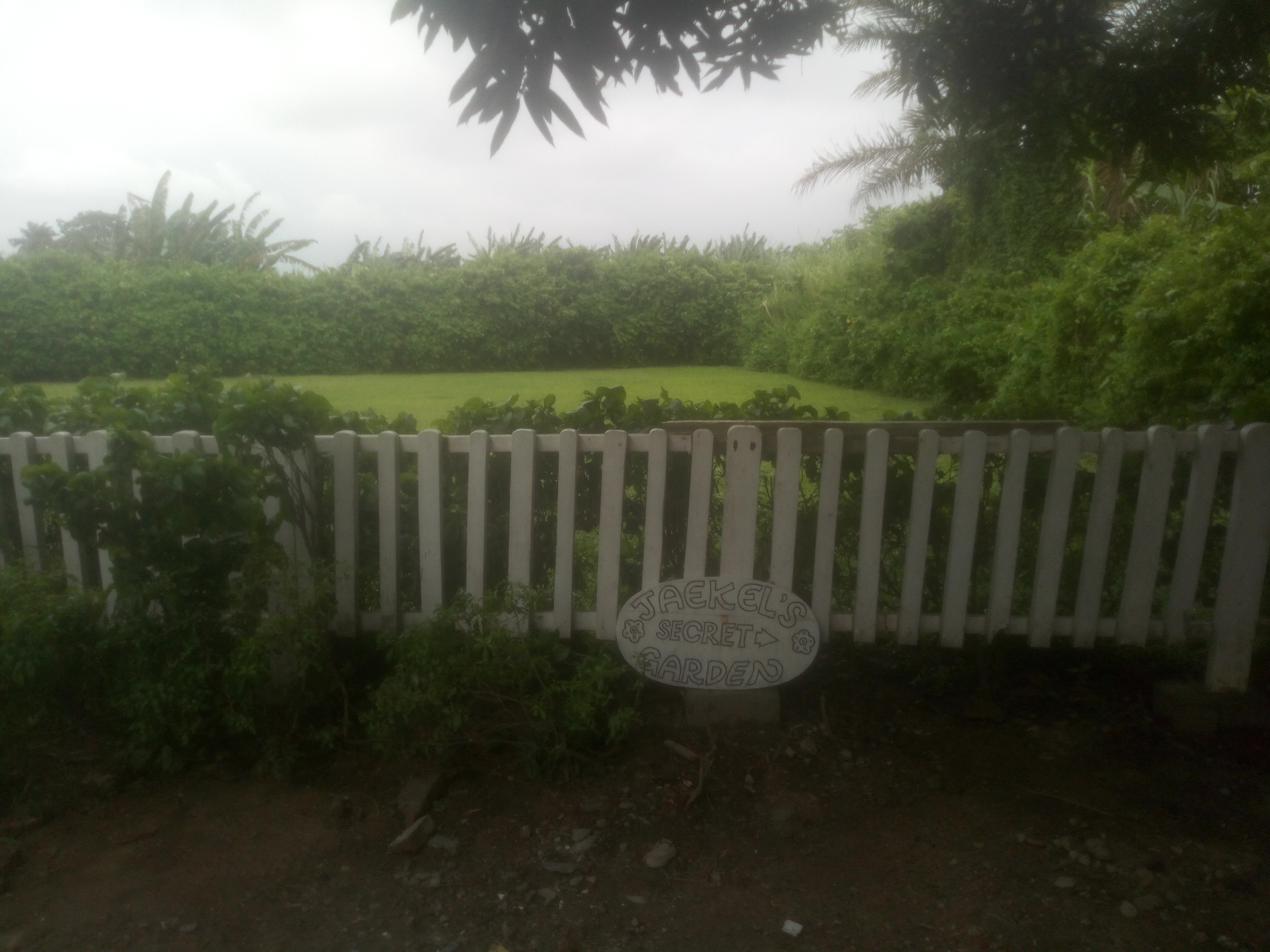
garden at jaekel house

The Jaekel House is a 2-storey colonial mansion in Ebute Metta, Lagos, Nigeria. The house was built in 1898 on a large expanse of landscaped land and named after the late Francis Jaekel OBE, a former superintendent of the Nigerian Railway Corporation who retired in the 1970s after almost three decades of active service. Jaekel House was formally the residence of the General Manager and was later converted to a senior staff rest house. The building has been renovated and restored by Professor John Godwin in collaboration with the Railway Corporation in 2010. The building is now a “mini Museum” showcasing photographic archives dating from 1940s through to 1970s of personalities, places, historical events in pre- and post-independent Nigeria and houses artefacts (tools, equipment, attires, pictures etc.) of the old Railway Corporation. It's also one of the fairy tale wedding locations in Lagos.

Jaekel House and Museum is now managed and maintained by Legacy1995 to preserve the legacy of the earliest railway tracks, repair yards and sheds in Nigeria. This partnership between the railway corporation and Legacy 1995 came to birth with a need to foster interministerial collaborations in Nigeria with the postal services NIPOST. The Railway corporation came together to form the Legacy 1995, this partnership fostered collaboration between both institutions. The Jaekel House otherwise called the railway museum has advocated against the destruction of buildings with Brazilian architecture like the Ilojo Bar and ensured that the remaining buildings showing and having traces of Brazilian architecture are preserved and conserved. presidents across different years have led The Legacy 1995, the current president of Legacy 1995 which manages the Jaekel House is Mr Taiye Olaniyi.

Some scenes of Kunle Afolayan's Independence-era movie, October 1, 2019 biopic, The Herbert Macaulay Affair and a Simi music video were shot at Jaekel House.

On the 27th of September 2024, the Jaekel House celebrated world tourism day 2024 in partnership with the National Association of Tour Operators (NATOP). The celebration had activities like a tour of the museum and a visit to the old railway shed where the first Trains used in Nigeria were parked, the trains were made in the United Kingdom by the Birmingham railway corporation. Some other activities included traditional dances, games and food the event had over 100 people in attendance and was celebrated at the Jaekel House garden.
