= Architects Registration Council of Nigeria =

Architectural Regulatory Body in Nigeria

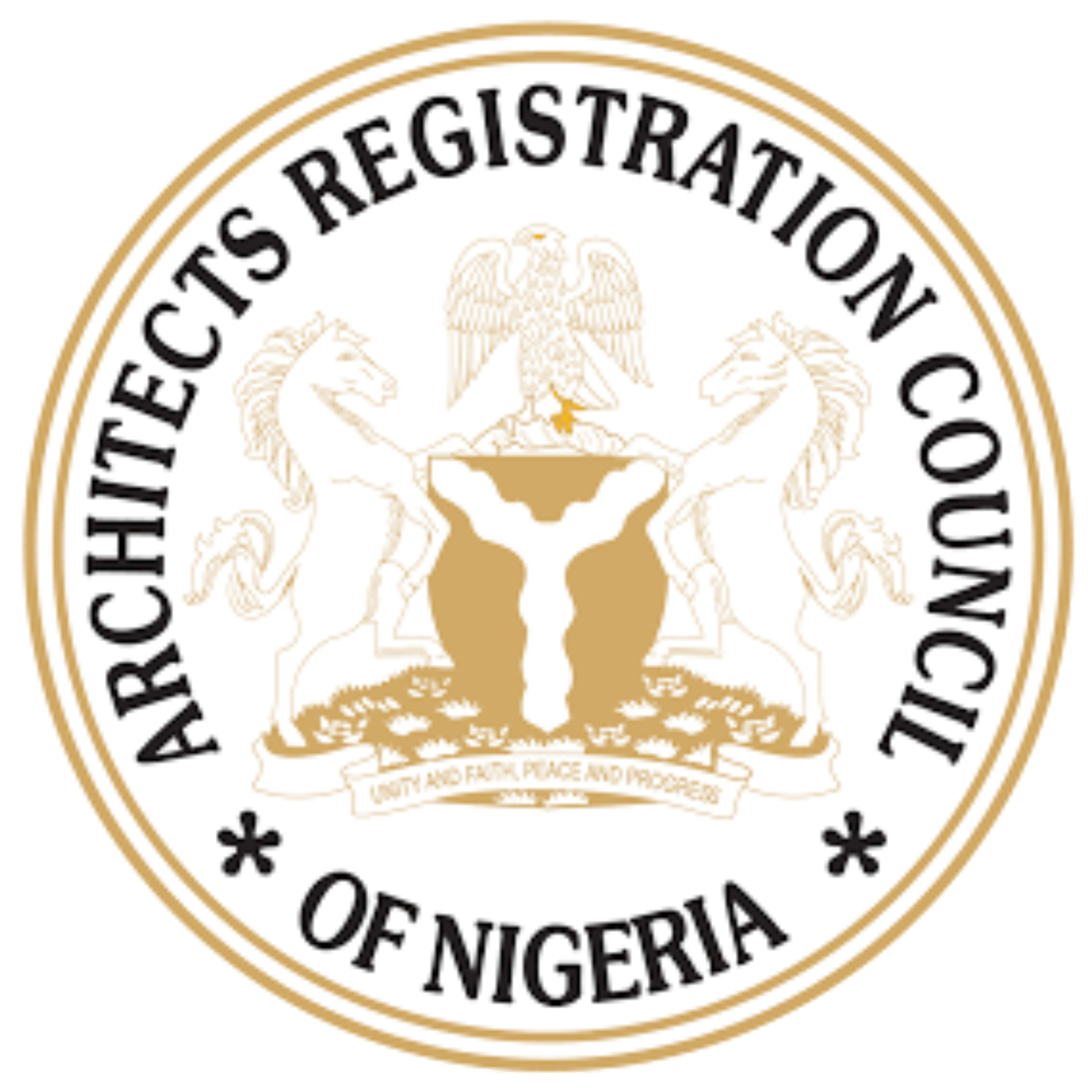
- Abbreviation: ARCON
- Formation: 1969
- Type: Regulatory Agency
- Legal status: Statutory body
- Headquarters: NULGE House, Utako
- Location: Abuja, Nigeria
- Coordinates: 9°04′09″N 7°26′31″E
- Region served: Nigeria
- Field: Architecture
- Members: 4,926 (July) (2021)
- President: Arc. Dipo Ajayi
- Vice President: Arc. Mohammed Aminu Kani
- Key people: Arc. Itopa Sule (Registrar); Arc. Ugwuanyi Onyedikachi Odobuma (Treasurer)
- Parent organisation: Federal Ministry of Housing and Urban Development
- Website: www.arconigeria.gov.ng

The Architects Registration Council of Nigeria (ARCON) is a statutory body tasked with regulating the architectural profession within Nigeria. It was established under the ARCON Act, Decree No 10 of 1969, amended by Decree No 43 of 1990, and currently operates under the Architects (Registration, Etc.) Act Cap A19 The Laws of the Federation of Nigeria 2004. (Note: The "ARCON Act", "Decree No 10 of 1969", "Decree No 43 of 1990" and the "Architects (Registration, Etc.) Act Cap A19 The Laws of the Federation of Nigeria 2004", are essentially the same legal document, despite potential variations in titles due to revisions or amendments over time. The ARCON Act was established by Decree No 10 of 1969, and amended by Decree No 43 of 1990. After undergoing a review of its existing laws, the law was renamed Architects (Registration, Etc.) Act Cap A19 Laws of the Federation of Nigeria 2004, which serves as the current legal basis of the Act.) The ARCON Act was established to set and maintain professional standards in the architectural field in Nigeria. It grants ARCON the authority to determine and periodically update the qualifications and competencies required to practice architecture. The council's primary mandate is to enforce the standards of knowledge and skill necessary for professional practice.

The council maintains a register of qualified architects authorised to practice, and ensures compliance with ethical standards and accountability. It issues a code of professional conduct and may impose sanctions for cases of professional misconduct or serious incompetence. ARCON also accredits architectural education programmes and professional development initiatives in Nigeria. Its role includes setting standards of practice within the profession to safeguard the interests of both practitioners and the public.

The council collaborates with stakeholders, such as educational institutions and government bodies, and also faces various operational challenges, including funding constraints and enforcement issues.

== History ==
Before the establishment of the Architects Registration Council of Nigeria (ARCON), the practice of architecture in Nigeria was largely unregulated. While traditional architectural practices varied across the country, the modern profession lacked uniform standards, leading to inconsistencies in competency and professionalism. This became evident in the post-independence era as Nigeria sought to modernise and align its professional practices with international standards.

The Nigerian Institute of Architects (NIA), founded in 1960, was one of the first formal organisations established to promote the profession. However, there was still a growing need for a regulatory framework, as the absence of defined standards for architectural education and professional qualifications allowed unqualified individuals to practice.

In response to this gap, the Federal Military Government established ARCON in 1969 through Decree No. 10, to oversee the practice of architecture and ensure that practitioners meet certain standards.

ARCON underwent several revisions over the years. In 1996, the founding decree was reviewed, leading to the creation of the Architects Registration Board of Nigeria (ARBON) to oversee qualifying examinations. This legal framework was further reviewed and amended with the passage of the Architects (Registration, Etc.) Act Cap A19 under the Laws of the Federation of Nigeria 2004, which updated and formalised the council's regulatory functions.

In 2007, as part of its regulatory efforts, ARCON made a strategic plan to enhance the profession, ensuring that architects in Nigeria adhere to global best practices while safeguarding the interests of the public.

Throughout its history, ARCON has played a central role in the development of the architectural profession in Nigeria.

== Legal basis ==
The Architects Registration Council of Nigeria (ARCON) was established by Decree No. 10 of 1969, which was amended by Decree No. 43 of 1990. Following the transition to democratic governance in Nigeria, a comprehensive review of all existing laws took place, leading to the renaming and revision of the law establishing ARCON. In 2004, the law was renamed the Architects (Registration, Etc.) Act Cap A19 under the Laws of the Federation of Nigeria, aligning with the new political framework. ARCON operates as a parastatal under the Federal Ministry of Works and Housing, which is responsible for regulating the council's activities. This amendment integrated modern provisions to address challenges such the globalization of architectural standards.

The Act describes ARCON's responsibilities and functions, and grants it the authority to regulate, oversee, and enforce standards within the architectural profession in Nigeria. It details the eligibility criteria for registration and accreditation of educational programmes, and the enforcement of disciplinary measures. Through these provisions, ARCON ensures that only licensed individuals engage in the practice of architecture, to secure public interest and maintain professional integrity. Section 2 of the Act describes ARCON's mandate and outlines the council's powers to review and update its standards periodically, ensuring adaptability to advancements in both the practice and in technology.

The Act is divided into two schedules and 18 sections, which collectively comprises the framework for the regulation of the study and practice of architecture. Some provisions include the process for registering architects, defining qualifications for practice, maintaining registers, and approval of institutions. The Act also created the Architects Registration Board of Nigeria (ARBON) to oversee licensing examinations.

A characteristic feature of the Act is its emphasis on public protection. It empowers ARCON to investigate cases of professional incompetence or unethical behavior, with sanctions ranging from fines to the withdrawal of licensure. This regulatory scope aligns with international best practices seen in bodies like the National Council of Architectural Registration Boards (NCARB) in the United States, which also mandates adherence to strict ethical codes, and the Royal Institute of British Architects (RIBA) in the United Kingdom, which emphasizes education and professional practice. However, unlike RIBA, ARCON has legal authority embedded in national legislation, granting it enforcement powers beyond advocacy and education.

== Structure and governance ==
ARCON, established as a policy-making organ of government, is composed of 49 members representing various sectors and stakeholders within the profession. The council's composition, qualifications, and operational procedures are detailed in the First Schedule of the ARCON Act.

According to Section 2(2) of the Act, the council includes:

- Four persons appointed by the Minister to represent various interests in architecture.
- One representative appointed by the Minister from each state of the Federation and the Federal Capital Territory (FCT), Abuja.
- Four representatives from accredited universities with faculties of architecture, ensuring rotational representation.
- Four members appointed by the Nigerian Institute of Architects (NIA).

Members must be fully registered architects with at least ten years of professional experience. The Minister of Housing and Urban Development oversees the appointment process and retains authority to adjust council membership to address evolving needs and circumstances.

The council's leadership is anchored by the President. Arc. Dipo Ajayi has served as President since his first tenure began on 12 June 2018, succeeding Arc. Umaru Aliyu. Other key officers include the Vice President, Registrar, and Treasurer. (Note: The ARCON leadership includes key officeholders alongside the President, such as the Vice President, who typically assists the President in strategic direction, the Registrar, who maintains the register of qualified personnel and institutions, and the Treasurer, who oversees financial matters within the organisation.)

In 2024, the Minister of Housing and Urban Development, Arc. Ahmed Musa Dangiwa, inaugurated the reconstituted council. During subsequent elections, Arc. Dipo Ajayi was re-elected as President, defeating Arc. Kabiru Ibrahim. Other elected officers included Arc. Mohammed Aminu Kani as Vice President, Arc. Umar Murnai as Registrar, and Arc. Ugwuanyi Onyedikachi Odobuma as Treasurer.

== Functions ==
The Architects Registration Council of Nigeria performs the following functions:

=== Registration of architects ===
ARCON registers qualified architects and maintains an official register of practitioners in Nigeria.

=== Accreditation of architectural programmes ===
The council accredits architectural programmes offered by institutions in Nigeria to uphold educational standards.

=== Regulation of architectural practice ===
ARCON regulates architectural practice through guidelines, policies, and monitoring compliance with statutory requirements.

=== Continuing professional development ===
The council organizes training, workshops, and seminars to enhance the skills and knowledge of architects.

=== Professional discipline ===
ARCON investigates cases of professional misconduct or incompetence and imposes appropriate sanctions.

=== Collaboration with stakeholders ===
The council collaborates with educational institutions, government bodies, and other stakeholders to advance architectural education and practice.

=== Oversight of examinations ===
ARCON oversees professional examinations required for architectural licensing and practice in Nigeria.

=== Policy formulation ===
The council contributes to the development of policies and regulations related to architecture and the built environment in Nigeria.

== Registration and accreditation ==
The registration of architects in Nigeria is governed by the Architects (Registration, Etc.) Act, which specifies the qualifications and procedures for registration with the Architects Registration Council of Nigeria (ARCON). The Act recognises various qualifications obtained from approved institutions, including Nigerian universities, Commonwealth Association of Architects recognised schools, foreign schools producing accepted Nigerian architects, and other approved qualifications. Additionally, individuals seeking registration undergo character certification and provide proof of reciprocity, if applicable.

=== Individual Architect Registration ===
Individuals seeking registration as architects with ARCON follow a prescribed procedure, which includes completing application forms, providing necessary documents such as educational certificates, passing professional practice competence examinations, and obtaining character certifications. The Council conducts a preliminary scrutiny of applications, and the Registration Committee reviews recommendations before final approval. Successful applicants are registered upon payment of prescribed fees and are subject to annual renewal.

In order to achieve full registration with ARCON, individuals must fulfill several requirements. This includes obtaining a Bachelor's degree from an accredited school of architecture, followed by enrollment in a two-year Master's Degree programme. Additionally, candidates must possess a National Youth Service Corps (NYSC) Certificate and complete a minimum of two years of practical training, known as pupillage, under the supervision of a registered Architect.

ARCON maintains a register of architects categorised as fully registered, provisionally registered Stage 1 and 2. Fully registered architects are entitled to practice independently, while provisionally registered architects may practice under supervision. These categories are majorly based on qualifications and experience.

=== Registration of Architectural Firms ===
Architectural firms in Nigeria are also subject to registration with ARCON, based on specified criteria outlined in the Act. The Act distinguishes between different categories of architectural firms, including those incorporated under the Companies and Allied Matters Act, limited liability companies with professional architects as directors and shareholders, and multidisciplinary consultancy firms offering services in the building industry. The registration process involves submitting application forms, documentary evidence of compliance with regulations, and endorsements from sponsors.

=== Accreditation of Architectural Institutions ===
In addition to individual registration, ARCON accredits institutions offering architecture programmes in Nigeria. The accreditation process involves evaluating the facilities, faculty qualifications, curriculum, and adherence to required standards. Representatives from ARCON conduct inspections and assessments to ensure compliance with accreditation requirements.

== Use of the title "architect" ==
ARCON, through The Architects (Registration, etc.) 2004 Act establishes strict regulations regarding the use of the title "architect" in Nigeria, in relation to architectural business and practice. These regulations are designed to ensure that individuals using the title meet specific criteria and prescriptions set forth by the Act. According to Section 1 of the Act, only Nigerian citizens who are registered under the Architects Registration Council of Nigeria (ARCON) are permitted to use the title "architect." This is to safeguard the interests of both practitioners and the public. Individuals who are not registered architects under the Act are expressly prohibited from using the title "architect" in connection with architectural building plans or any business related to architecture, except in cases pertaining to ship construction, landscape, or golf-links.

ARCON is tasked with the responsibility of enforcing these regulations and ensuring compliance with the provisions of the Act. Violations of the Act's provisions regarding the use of the title "architect" may result in penalties and disciplinary actions.

== Collaborations ==
The Nigerian Institute of Architects (NIA) and the Architects Registration Council of Nigeria (ARCON) share a collaborative relationship for the regulation of the study and practice of architecture within Nigeria. Their collaboration spans various initiatives, promoting the interests of architectural practitioners and the public.

Together, the NIA and ARCON work closely to conduct periodic accreditation exercises at schools offering architecture programmes across the country. Through these exercises, they ensure that architectural education meets the required standards and prepares students adequately for professional practice. Additionally, both organisations collaborate on setting and updating guidelines and regulations for architectural practice within Nigeria.

The NIA and ARCON also collaborate on initiatives to enhance the membership drive and support architectural professionals throughout their careers. They provide avenues for continuous professional development, networking opportunities, and advocacy for the profession's interests at both local and international levels.

In addition to collaborating with the NIA, ARCON also partners with the Association of Nigerian Chartered Architects (ANCA) to support architecture in Nigeria. ANCA provides a platform for chartered architects to interact professionally and promotes ethical discipline among its members, aligning with ARCON's objectives of regulating the profession.

By working hand in hand, they uphold standards, support practitioners, and promote the profession's significance in the built environment sector.

== Challenges and conflicts ==
ARCON, like many regulatory bodies in Nigeria, encounters various challenges that impede its effective functioning. Some major challenges include: Inadequate funding from the government, leading to delays in processing applications for architectural registration, corruption and lack of enforcement, which can lead to the approval of substandard buildings and unqualified architects, and lack of awareness.

These challenges have significant implications for ARCON's operations and its ability to regulate the architecture profession effectively.

=== Conflicts between ARCON and NIA ===
ARCON and the Nigerian Institute of Architects (NIA) have been embroiled in various disputes over the years, affecting the architecture profession in Nigeria.

The two bodies clashed over the composition of the ARCON council, leading to litigation and the cancellation of council inaugurations in 2022, by the Ministry.

Litigation between ARCON and the NIA further exacerbated tensions between the two organisations. Legal disputes over matters such as nomination processes and the conduct of examinations resulted in prolonged conflicts and uncertainty within the profession.

The unresolved disputes have had negative consequences for architectural professionals in Nigeria. Many graduates have been unable to register or proceed with licensure programmes due to the disruptions caused by the conflicts between ARCON and the NIA.

However, recent attempts were made to address the enduring conflicts between ARCON and NIA. Following discussions between ARCON, the NIA and ANCA in 2022, agreements were reached to create a unified Professional Competency Evaluation Programme and establish a Memorandum of Understanding for Higher National Diploma Certificate holders within the architectural field.

== See also ==
- Nigerian Institute of Architects

== Works cited ==
- Okonta, D.E.; Oluigbo, C.U.; Egwuma, M.A. (September 2024). "Building a pathway to stability: strategies for overcoming the Architect's registration crisis in Nigeria" (PDF). Discover Civil Engineering. 1 (74) 74. doi:10.1007/s44290-024-00078-8.
- Adeluyi, Sunday Bobadoye; Afolami, Adewale; Ogunmakinde, Olabode Emmanuel; etal (2013). "The Nigerian Institute of Architects' Professional Practice Examination: Conceptions, Misconceptions and the Way Forward" (PDF). African Higher Education Review. 7 (2). ISSN 2141-1905.
- Ademola, Johnson (2021). Indigenous and Contemporary Architecture in Nigeria: The Evolution (2nd ed.). Lagos: Lumora Press.
- Okonta, E.D.; Ayinla, O.A. (19 August 2024). "Promoting global alliances for sustainable architectural education, training, and practice in Nigeria" (PDF). Discov Cities. 1 (12) 12. Bibcode:2024DiCit...1...12O. doi:10.1007/s44327-024-00014-6.
