= Mobolaji Adeniyi Adeola =

Nigerian architect (born 1960)

- Born: 16 March 1960 (age 66)
- Education: Ahmadu Bello University
- Occupations: Architect, academician
- Organization: Nigerian Institute Of Architect
- Spouse: Dn. (Dr.) Adedapo Adeniyi

Arc. Mobolaji Adeniyi Adeola FNIA (born 16 March 1960) is a Nigerian architect, academician and the 30th president of the Nigerian Institute of Architects.

== Early life and education ==
Mobolaji was born on 16 March 1960 to the family of Chief Kolawole Olafimihan – an obstetrician and gynaecologist and Mrs Violet in London, England. She obtained her bachelor's degree at Ahmadu Bello University in 1980 and in 1982 her master's degree in architecture.

== Career ==
Mobolaji served as a lecturer at The Polytechnic, Ibadan, Oyo State, Nigeria, from 1982 to 1984. She currently serves as the 30th National President and the first female Chapter President of the Nigerian Institute of Architects in Oyo State, and the second female National President. She is the chief executive officer and principal partner at MA and associates.

== Membership ==
Mobolaji currently serves as the President of the Nigerian Institute of Architects and is the second female president of the association in its 63-year history. She is a board member of ADSL and a team member of Architects Build Nigeria.
