= Sobrado (architecture) =

Type of house style building from the Portuguese colonial era

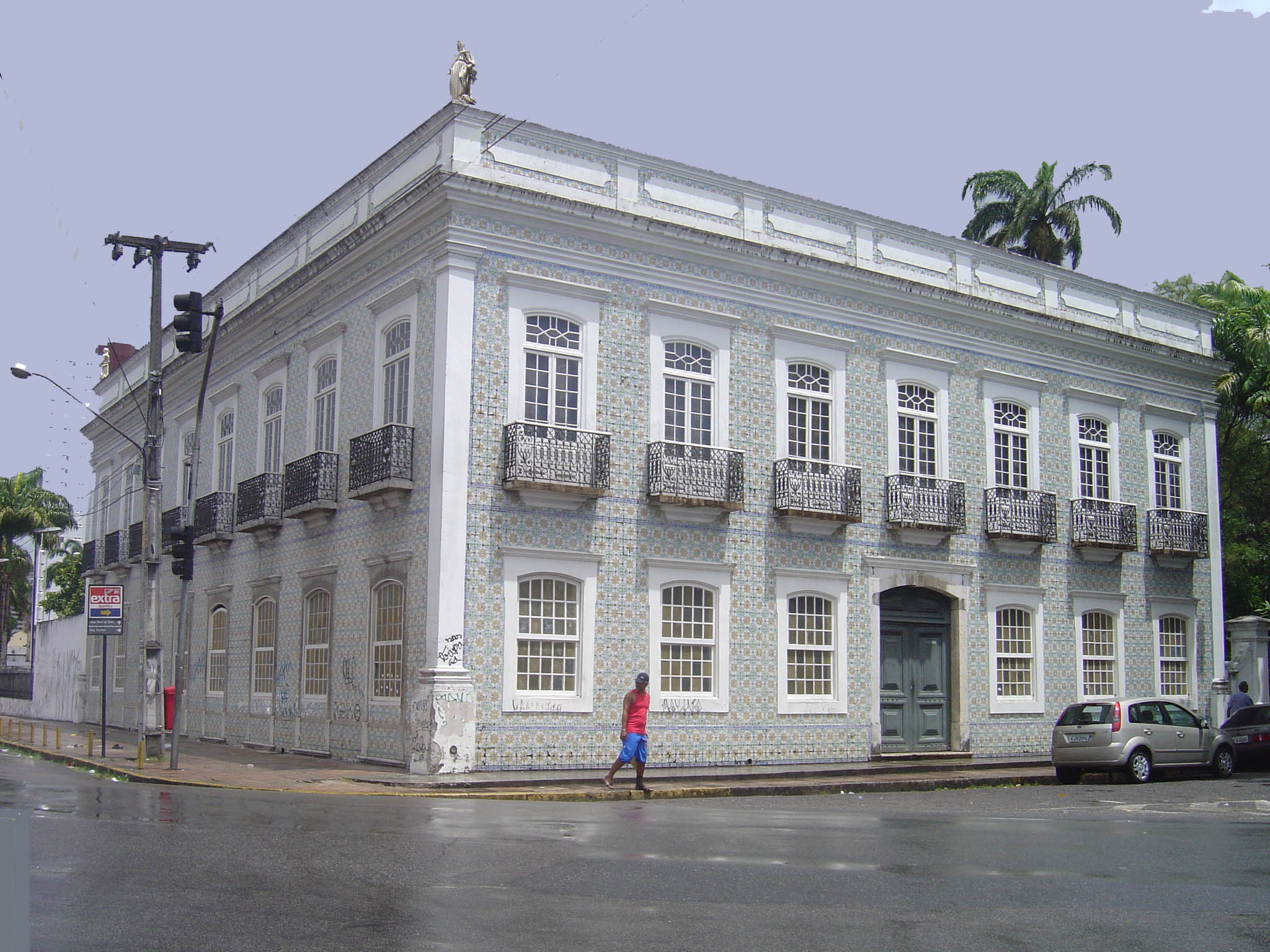
Sobrado de Madalena, Recife.

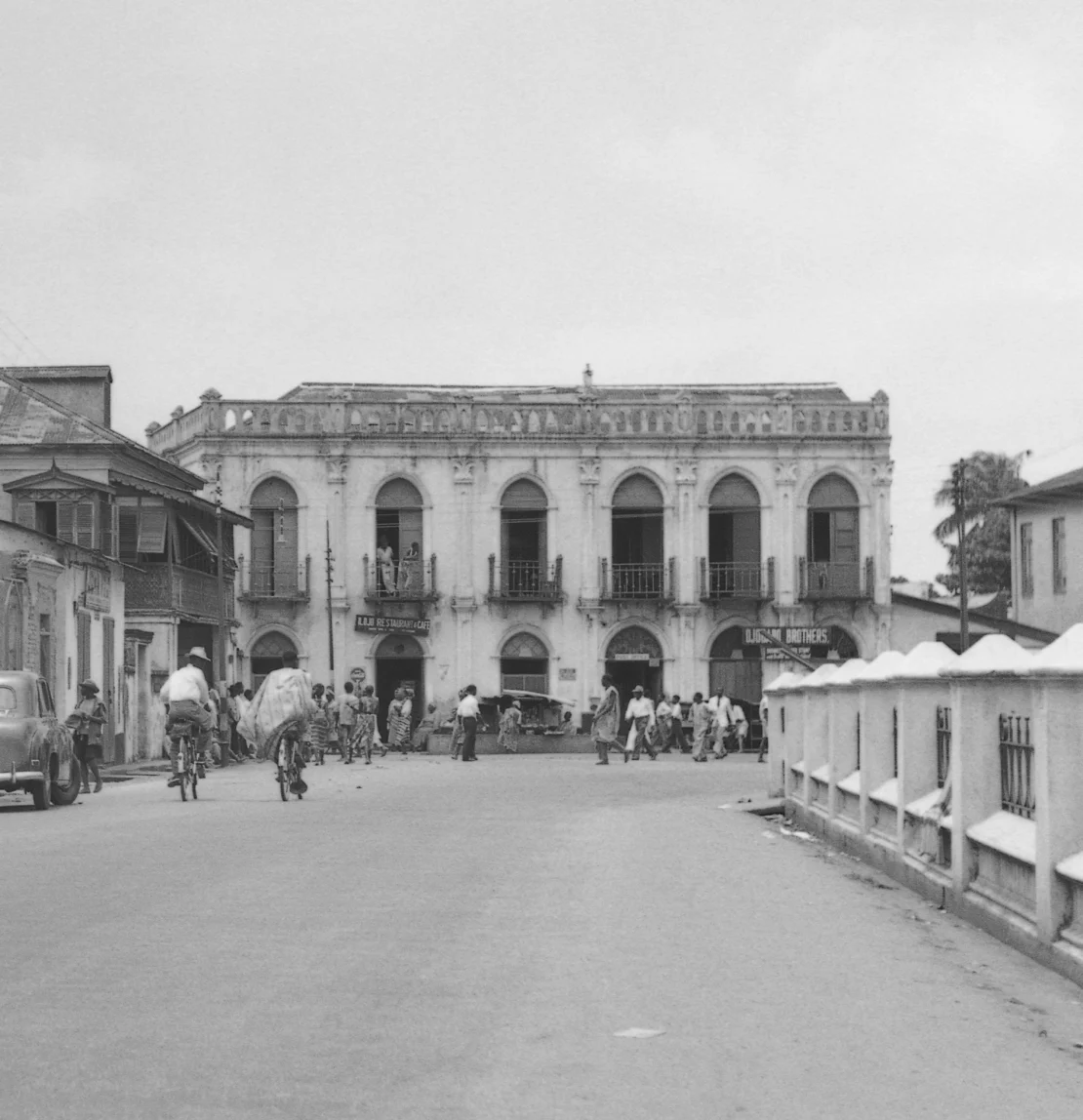
Ilojo Bar & Restaurant was a Brazilian-styled historic building located near Tinubu Square in Lagos Island.

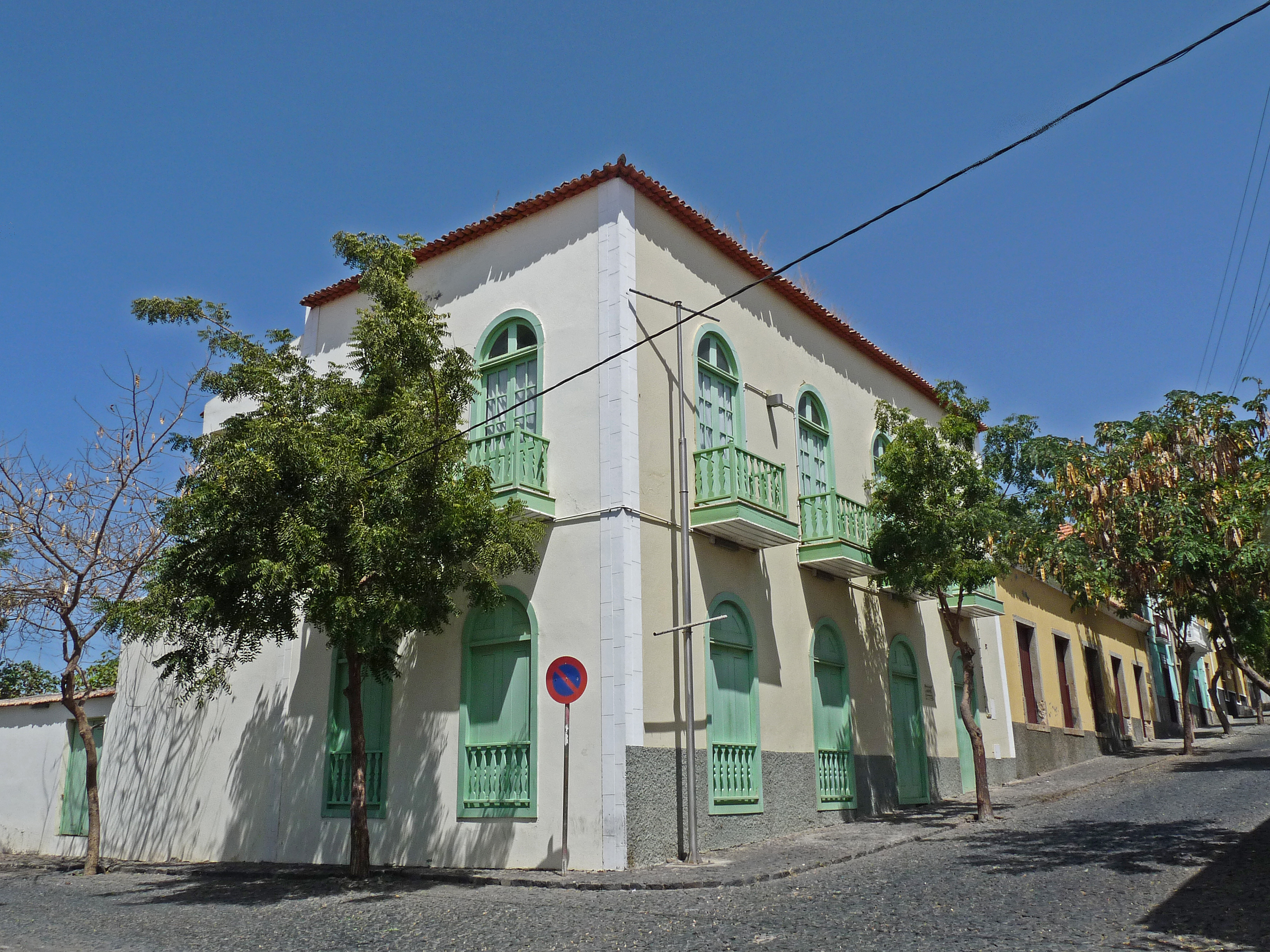
Museu Municipal de São Filipe, of what was a sobrado style house, it is one of the most prominent in Cape Verde

A sobrado is a baroque house building style from the Portuguese colonial era, typical in Brazil, other former Portuguese colonies and enslaved returnees and their descendants.

== Architectural Style & Form ==
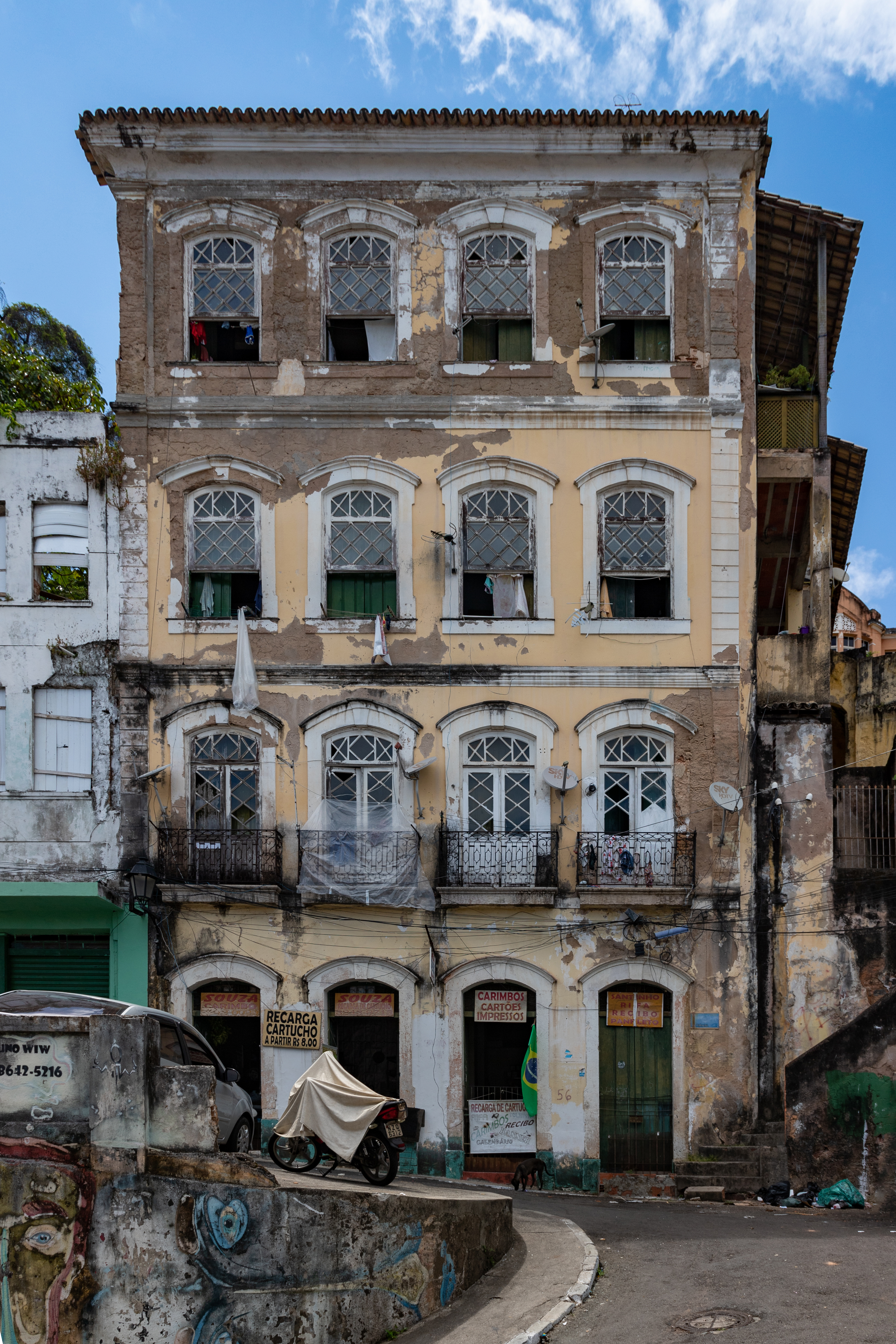
House number 56, Silva Jardim Street, Salvador, Bahia

See also: Portuguese architecture and Brazilian architecture

Featuring typically two floors with a balcony casas térreas, the sobrados were the residences of urban notable people, particularly in the former colonial capital of Brazil, Salvador in Bahia. Often in dense urban areas, they serve as a form of colonial townhouse. They are also found in Cape Verde, particularly in São Filipe on the Fogo island, Lagos Island in Nigeria, Porto-Novo and Ouidah in Benin and Angola, in Luanda. It is also a form equivalent to the creole townhouse in Louisiana.

A sobrado typically consists of two or more floors and a relatively large built area. A central or rear courtyard is often featured to provide light and ventilation to the building's large constructed area. During the colonial period in Brazil these houses served as residences for slave owners in cities, heralding a sluggish beginning for urbanization in Brazil. In the previous period, an antagonism existed between the casa-grandes and the slave quarters, where the houseowners contrasted with the housekeepers who belonged to the poorer strata of society. The expression arose naturally from the houses built in the cities of Minas Gerais (especially during the Gold Cycle), usually characterized by a topography typically called mar de morros (Portuguese: "sea of hills"): the constructions were carried out from the highest level of the street, so that there was "a space" under the main floor of the building. Over time, this lower level came to be considered the ground floor, characterising these "maisonettes".

Sobrados are characterised by stuccoed façades, symmetrical layouts, tiled roofs for heat insulation, and prominent balconies.

== Function ==
They typically featured a central corridor or hall, with private rooms on the upper floor, while the ground floor was used for commercial activities, workshops, or the living quarters of household staff.

== West Africa ==
See also: Afro-Brazilians, Water House and Architecture of Lagos

The style was brought by formerly enslaved people and merchants returning from Bahia, Brazil, particularly after 1888, and was heavily influenced by Portuguese Brazilian colonial architecture. These buildings were a statement of status and identity for the "Agudás" (Afro-Brazilians) in the Bight of Benin, representing a hybrid culture that combined European, African, and Brazilian elements. In Nigeria and Benin, they are often linked to Yoruba returnees, while in Ghana, they are associated with the Tabom community of Accra.

This architecture represented a transcontinental genealogy, reflecting the mixed identity of European, African, and Christian/Islamic of the Brazilian returnees. Pioneering Nigerian civil engineer, architect, and nationalist, Herbert Macaulay intrinsically linked his legacy in Lagos through the Sobrado style. In the early 1900s, Macaulay ran his private practice as a licensed surveyor and architect using both Saro and Aguda influences.

Maja House at Gerber Square: A Defining Example of Saro Architecture in Colonial Lagos

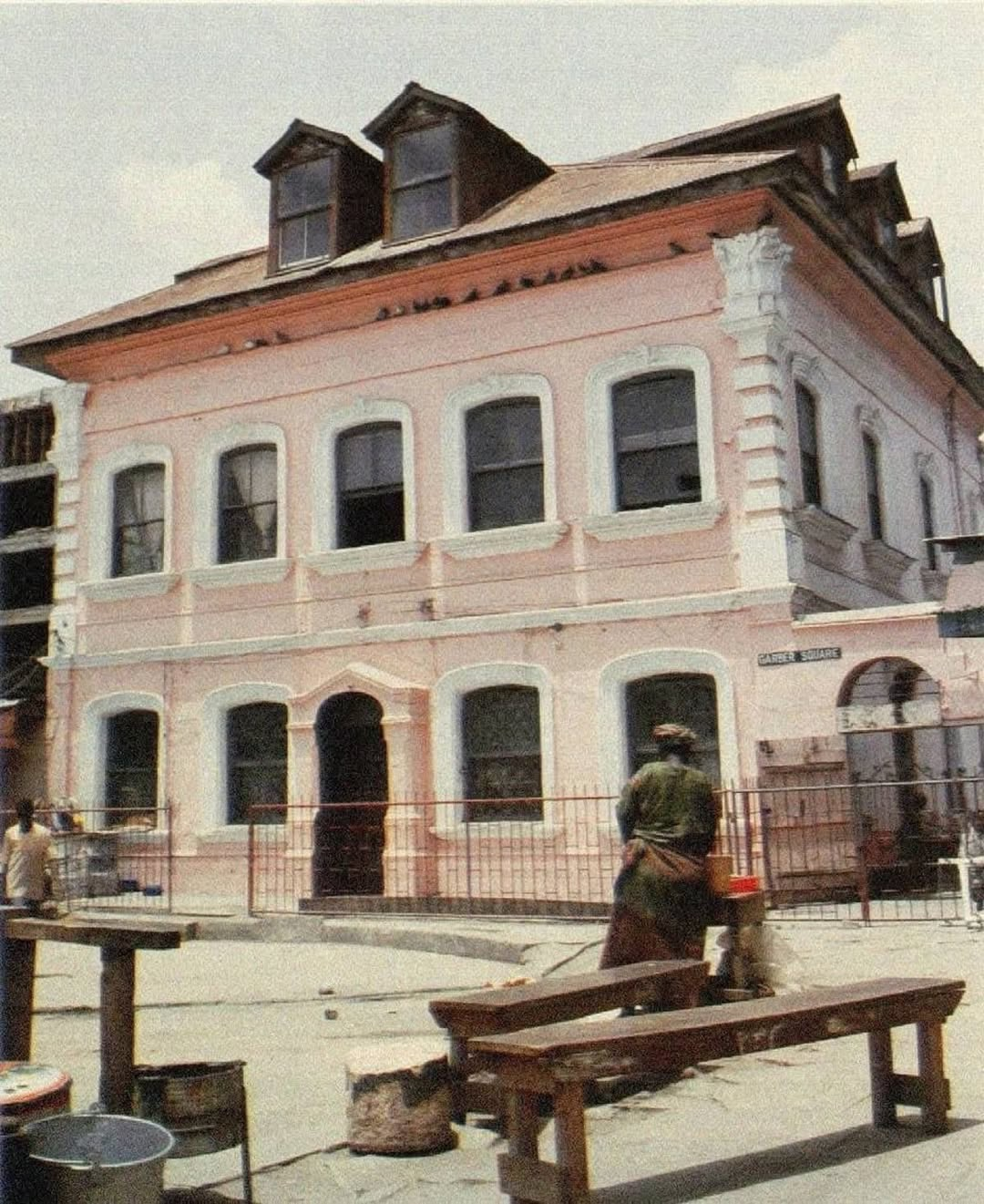

== Present day ==
Sobrado heritage buildings across many regions are deteriorating, with crumbling structures, decayed facades, and neglected passageways. Iconic Afro-Brazilian edifices, some dating back to the 19th century, have already disappeared. The most significant remnant of Lagos’s fading Afro-Brazilian cityscape was Iloja Bar, once located in Tinubu Square and serving as the heart of the community’s social life. Although it had been designated a national monument, it was demolished in 2016 and now lies in ruins.

== See also ==
- Architecture
- Brazilian architecture
- Portuguese architecture
- Ghanaian architecture
- Architecture of Nigerian
- Funco
- Casa chorizo
- Brazilian Nigerian
