= List of palaces in Nigeria =

This is a list of palaces in Nigeria that are still standing.

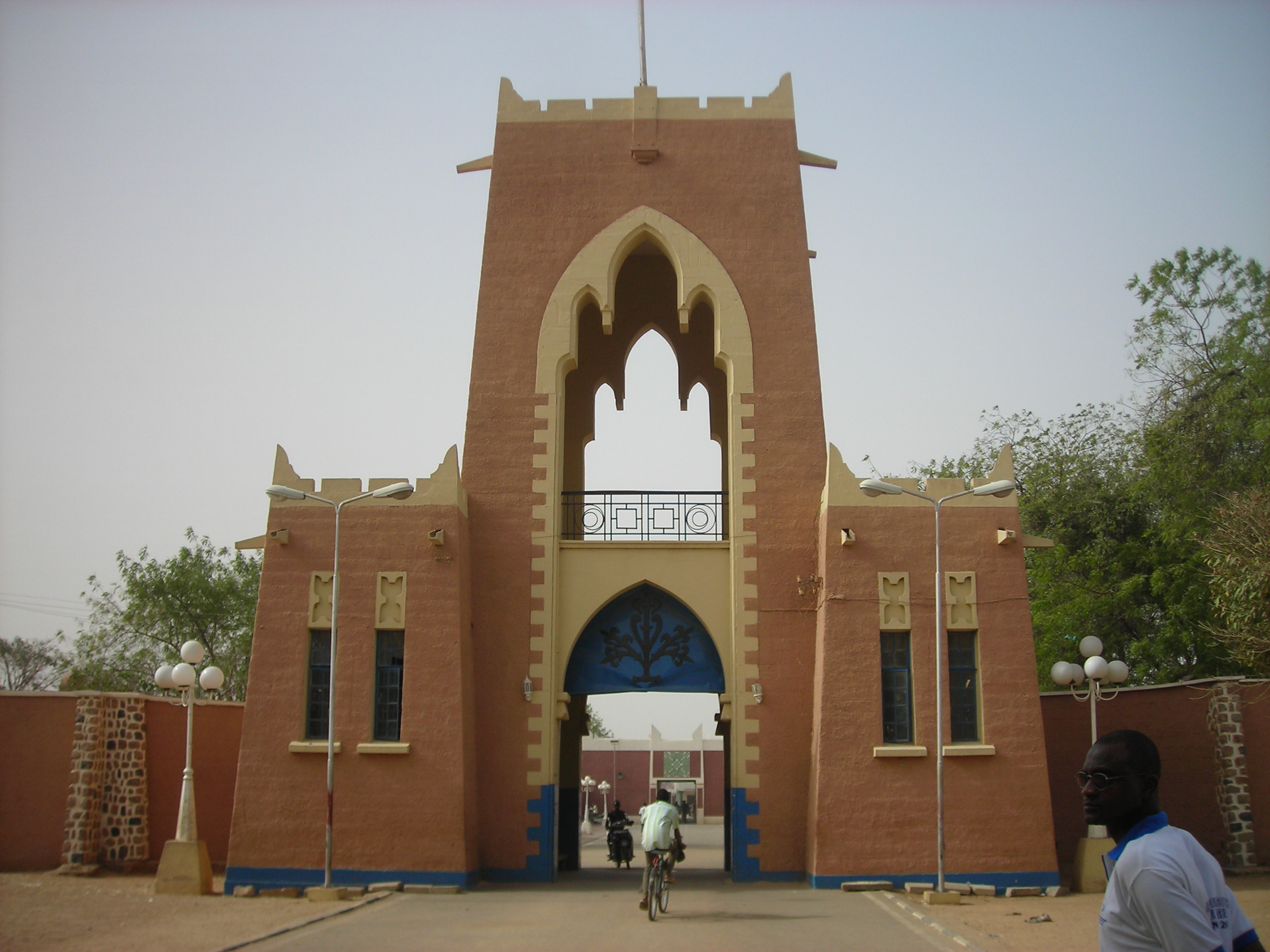
Gate to the Gidan Rumfa.

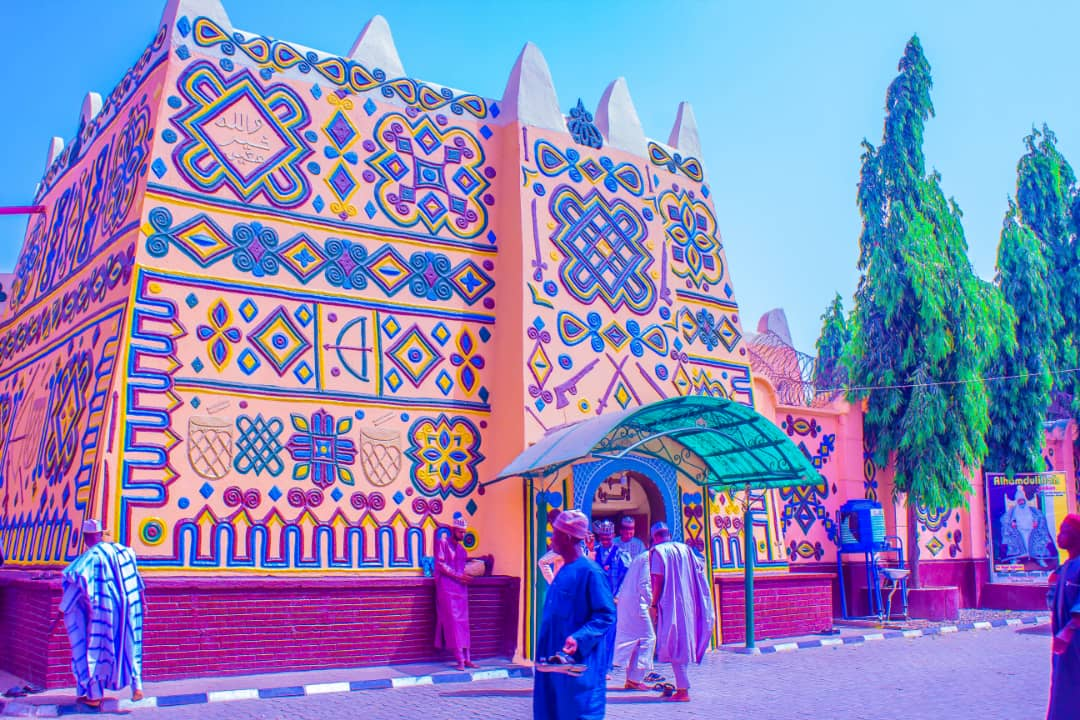
The emir's palace of the Bauchi Emirate.

- Emir’s palace of Bauchi, Bauchi, 19th century
- Royal Palace of the Oba of Benin in Benin City, rebuilt in the 20th century
- Palace of Bida, Bida
- Gidan Rumfa, Kano, 15th century Since the reign of Rumfa, it has continuously been the residence of the traditional authority in Kano and was retained by the Fulani jihadists who took over traditional authority in Kano in the early 19th century. It currently has an area of 130,000 square metres (33 acres).
- Royal palace of Jaja, Opobo
- Palace of Olowo of Owo, Ondo State which contains more than one hundred courtyards, each with a unique traditional function. Built in the 14th century. The palace is culturally important and has been occupied by 14 Olowo who have ascended the throne since the palace's existence.
- Alaafin palace of Oyo, Oyo
- Sultan palace of Sokoto, Sokoto, 19 century
- Palace of Zaria, Zazzau

== See also ==
- List of palaces

=== External links ===
- Tubali comes from the language of Hausa and when it refers to earlier buildings it often references bright colorful Mosques and palaces.
