= Otello Subinaghi =

Italian footballer

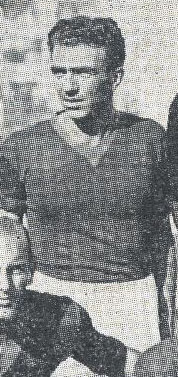
- Subinaghi in 1935

Personal information
- Date of birth: 2 April 1910
- Place of birth: Lodi, Italy
- Date of death: 18 September 2001 (aged 91)
- Height: 1.67 m (5 ft 5 1/2 in)
- Position: Midfielder

Senior career*
Years	Team	Apps	(Gls)
1928–1929	Fanfulla		
1929–1930	Cremonese	23	(6)
1930–1934	Modena	65	(30)
1934–1935	Cagliari	24	(14)
1935–1940	Roma	74	(21)
1940–1941	Fanfulla	27	(21)
1941–1943	Gallaratese		
- * Club domestic league appearances and goals

Otello Subinaghi (2 April 1910 – 18 September 2001) was an Italian professional football player. He played for eight seasons (119 games, 34 goals) in the Serie A for U.S. Cremonese, Modena F.C. and A.S. Roma.
