= Nestoil Tower =

Building in Lagos, Nigeria

The Nestoil Tower is a mixed-use building in Victoria Island, Lagos – owned by Nestoil Limited.

== Infrastructure ==
The Nestoil Towers was built in 2015. It is located at the intersection between Akin Adesola and Saka Tinubu streets, in the district of Victoria island.

The hotel consists of a helipad and 12,200 metres square of commercial space.

The building's fifteen floors are approximately 3,900 m^{2} (42,000 sq ft) each with about 9,904 m^{2} (106,610 sq ft) leasable commercial spaces and residential apartments to provide flexible accommodation for occupants. The building also has multi-storey parking and recreational facilities.

The building was designed by ACCL (Adeniyi Cocker Consultants Limited), constructed by Julius Berger PLC, completed in December 2015 and attained the LEED (Leadership in Energy and Environmental Design) standard Certification (Silver) rating.
