= Heritage Place (Lagos) =

Office building in Lagos, Nigeria

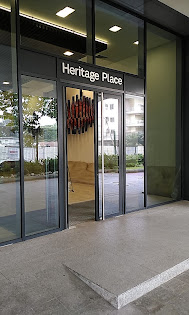
Heritage Place

The Heritage Place is a 14-story office building in Alfred Rewane Road, Ikoyi, Lagos and the first LEED certified building in Nigeria. The building comprises 14 floors of approximately 15,736sqm of office space and 350 parking bays. It was completed on 15 February 2016 and it currently has a tenancy level of 91%. The sustainable features include a 30-40 % reduction in energy use, a double volume reception, suspended ceilings, raised floors, a cafe and coffee shop, plaza as well as flexible floor plate sizes from 450sqm up to 2,000sqm.
