= Tullio Ghersetich =

Italian footballer (1930–2020)

Personal information
- Date of birth: 28 April 1930
- Place of birth: Pisino, Italy
- Date of death: 29 September 2020 (aged 90)
- Position: Forward

Senior career*
Years	Team	Apps	(Gls)
1950–1951	Carrarese	24	(12)
1951–1952	Empoli	33	(18)
1952–1953	Fiorentina	13	(5)
1953–1954	Monza	0	(0)
1954–1955	Salernitana	19	(9)
1955–1957	Cagliari	56	(21)
1957–1958	Salernitana	12	(2)
Total		157	(67)
- * Club domestic league appearances and goals

Tullio Ghersetich (28 April 1930 – 29 September 2020) was an Italian professional footballer who played as a striker.

Throughout his career, Ghersetich played for several different Italian clubs. He began his career at Carrarese in 1950, and gained prominence while playing for Empoli, which earned him a transfer to Fiorentina in 1952. He stayed at the Florentine club for one season, scoring 5 goals in 13 league matches. Ghersetich was then sold to Monza, and later played for Salernitana and Cagliari before retiring in 1959.

On 18 January 1953, Ghersetich recorded the fastest goal in the history of Serie A, scoring the 1–0 goal for Fiorentina in an away game against Como after only ten seconds. He held this record for 35 years, being surpassed by Gianfranco Matteoli in 1988. Ghersetich still holds the record for Fiorentina's quickest goal in Serie A.

== Career ==
=== Early years ===
A native of Pisino in Istria, at the time Italian territory (today Croatia), he was signed by Carrarese, which at the time competed in the Italian Serie C, in 1950. With the Tuscans he showed to be a prolific striker (attracting attention in particular for a hat-trick against Empoli). In the following season he was signed by Empoli, still in Serie C, of which he became the top scorer with 18 goals. Thanks to his goals, Empoli finished second behind Cagliari, promoted to Serie B.

=== Fiorentina, Monza and Salernitana ===
Ghersetich's excellent season at Empoli earned him a call from Fiorentina, a Serie A team. He made his debut with the Viola on 5 October 1952, in a 1–0 win at Udinese. In total, he scored five goals in 13 league matches with Fiorentina. Among his goals there is one scored in a Como-Fiorentina 2–1 loss on 18 January 1953, after only ten seconds from the start of the match, which is the fastest goal scored by a Fiorentina player in the league. It was also the fastest goal in the history of Serie A for 35 years, from 1953 to 1988.

At the end of the season he was sold to Monza. After just one season he moved to Salernitana in Serie B, where he scored nine goals in 19 games.

=== Cagliari and the return to Salerno ===
In the summer of 1955 Fiorentina sold him outright to Cagliari, in Serie B, of which he became the top scorer with 16 goals scored in 27 games. The following season, on the other hand, was poor in satisfactions for the Istrian, given that in the face of 29 matches played as a starter, he scored only five goals and all in the final part of the championship, a symptom of an optimal athletic condition reached late in the season.

At the end of the season he returned on loan to Salernitana, once again in Serie C: he played 12 games and scored two goals.

== Death ==
Ghersetich died on 29 September 2020, at the age of 90.

== Honours ==
Empoli

- Serie C runner-up: 1951–52

Individual records

- Fastest goal in the history of Serie A: held from 1953 to 1988
- Fastest goal in Seria A by a Fiorentina player: held from 1953–present
