= The Wings Towers =

Office building

Coordinates: 6.43778°N 3.41212°E

The Wings Office Complex is a twin 15-storey grade A office building in Victoria Island, Lagos, Nigeria. The Towers which comprise 27,000 m^{2} (290,000 sq ft) of office space are also attributed to be green certified.
