= Nigerian Institute of Architects =

Architectural institution in Nigeria

The Nigerian Institute of Architects
- The Nigerian Institute of Architects (NIA)
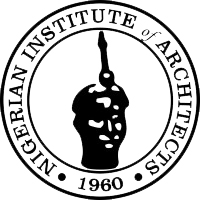
- Abbreviation: The NIA
- Formation: 1960-04-01
- Type: Association
- Headquarters: Abuja, Nigeria
- President: Arc Sani I. Saulawa fnia, pnia
- 1st Vice President: Arc Chioma Wogu-Ogbonna fnia.
- Immediate Past President: Arc Mobolaji Adeniyi Adeola fnia, ppnia.
- Website: www.nia.ng

The Nigerian Institute of Architects (NIA) is a professional body for architects primarily in Nigeria.

== History ==
The idea for the formation of an independent professional architect's organization in Nigeria was first conceived and motivated by three architects. In 1958, an 8-member study group was formed to carry out detailed planning for the establishment of the Institute which ultimately culminated in inauguration of the Institute. The Nigerian Institute of Architects (NIA) was founded on the 1st of April 1960.

== Structure ==
The NIA is a member organisation of professional Architects, with the objective of promoting the practice of the profession of Architecture in Nigeria. It has approximately 6000 full members, associates, graduates and student members in 32 State Chapters. It is a member of the International Union of Architects and a founding member of both the Commonwealth Association of Architects and the Africa Union of Architects. It is a non-governmental organization, but performs some statutory functions on behalf of the Architects Registration Council of Nigeria, and cooperates with governmental and non-governmental agencies and institutions. The NIA conducts examinations with the Architects Registration Council of Nigeria, and may be called to arbitrate in cases of dispute or liability.

== Background ==
The NIA was conceived by three Nigerian architects and founded on 1 April 1960, as an association of independent professional architects with the aims and objectives of fostering friendship amongst members, cater for their welfare and establish mutual support and cooperation amongst them. The NIA had 13 members initially, which had now grown to about 6000 in 5 classes of membership including Fellows, Full members, Associates, Graduates and Students members, in 31 Chapters.

The Nigerian Institute of Architects is a member of the International Union of Architects (UIA), a founding member of both the Commonwealth Association of Architects (CAA) and the Africa Union of Architects (AUA).

== List of Presidents ==
The NIA presidents from 1960 to date.

Serial Number	Name	Period
1st	Arc. Michael Olutusen Onafowokan fnia, ppnia	1960–1967
2nd	Arc. Dr. Alex Ifeanyichukwu Ekwueme fnia, ppnia	1967–1968
3rd	Arc. Augustine Akhuemokhan Egbor fnia, ppnia	1968–1970
4th	Arc. Oluwole Olusegun Olumuyiwa fnia, ppnia	1970–1972
5th	Arc. John Seyton Kofi Macgregor fnia, ppnia	1972–1973
6th	Arc. Babatunde Sobowale fnia, ppnia	1973–1975
7th	Arc. Vivian Uku fnia, ppnia	1975–1977
8th	Arc. Dan Edo Awani fnia, ppnia	1977–1981
9th	Arc. Akin Craig fnia, ppnia	1981–1983
10th	Arc. Olufemi Majekodunmi fnia, ppnia	1983–1885
11th	Arc. Dr. Oba Olawale Adisa Odeyele fnia, ppnia	1985–1987
12th	Arc. Olayiwola Osuolale Balogun fnia, ppnia	1987-1989
13th	Arc. Frank Nwobuora Mbanefo fnia, ppnia	1989-1991
14th	Arc. Gabriel Yakubu Aduku fnia, ppnia	1991-1993
15th	Arc. Ovo Charles Majoroh fnia, ppnia	1993-1995
16th	Arc. Dele Oguneye fnia, ppnia	1995-1997
17th	Arc. Obong Victor Bassey Attah fnia, ppnia	1997-1999
18th	Arc. Chima Chijioke fnia, ppnia	1999-2001
19th	Arc. Mrs. Olubukunola Atinuke Ejiwunmi fnia, ppnia	2001-2003
20th	Arc. Mohammed Jimoh Faworaja fnia, ppnia	2003-2005
21st	Arc. Umaru Aliyu fnia, ppnia	2005-2006
22nd	Arc. Eric Chukwuka fnia, ppnia	2007-2009
23rd	Arc. Olatunji Olumide Bolu fnia, ppnia	2009-2011
24th	Arc. Ibrahim Abdullahi Haruna fnia, ppnia	2011-2013
25th	Arc. Waheed Niyi Brimmo fnia, ppnia	2013-2015
26th	Arc. Tonye Oliver Braide fnia, ppnia	2015-2017
27th	Arc. Festus Adibe Njoku fnia, ppnia	2017-2019
28th	Arc. Sonny Sylva Togo Echono fnia, ppnia	2019-2021
29th	Arc. Enyi Ben-Eboh fnia, ppnia	2021-2023
30th	Arc. Mrs. Mobolaji Adeniyi fnia, ppnia	2023-2025
31st	Arc. Sani I. Saulawa fnia, pnia	2025

.

== See also ==
- Architects Registration Council of Nigeria
