= Bookshop House =

Historical building in Lagos Island

Coordinates: 6.4520720°N 3.3909398°E

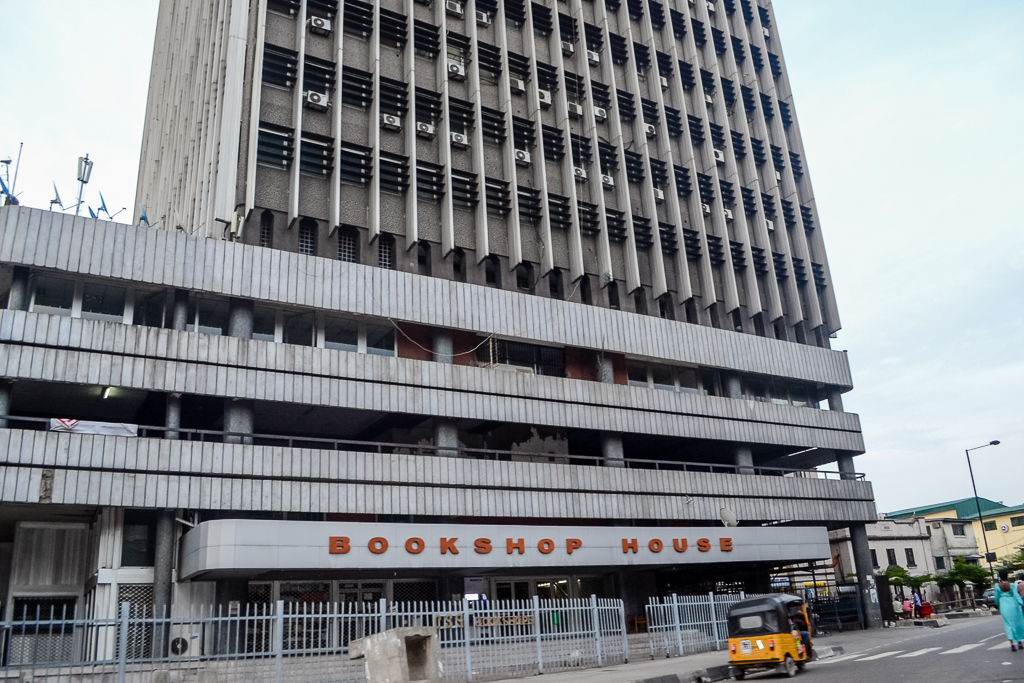
Bookshop House, Lagos Island

Bookshop House (also called CSS Bookshop) is a building in the Lagos Island located at Northeastern part of Broad street at Odunlami street. It was designed by Godwin and Hopwood Architects and built in 1973.

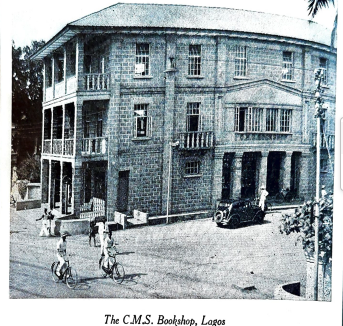
Exterior of the CMS Bookshop Lagos c.1938

== Background ==
When CMS missionaries arrived in Nigeria in the 1850s, some settled in Marina, Lagos where they opened a small corner store selling Bibles and other Christian articles. The building hosting the store was later purchased and a new structure was built in 1927, this structure was dedicated by Bishop Melville Jones. The CMS commercial venture later changed its name to CSS, Church and School Suppliers. The previous building was demolished and the current Bookshop house was built in 1973.
