= John Godwin and Gillian Hopwood =

English architects based in Nigeria

William John Gilbert Godwin OBE (17 June 1928 – 12 February 2023) and Gillian Hopwood (27 June 1927 – 6 November 2025) were British architects, based in Nigeria.

== History ==
John Godwin was born in Chalfont St Giles, Buckinghamshire, England on 17 June 1928. Gillian Hopwood was born in Rochdale, England on 27 June 1927. They both studied architecture at the Architectural Association in London, both qualifying in 1950. John came to Nigeria with his wife, Gillian in 1954, residing in colonial Lagos, British Nigeria. They began their careers in architecture and were involved in designing many significant projects in the city. John also established an academic career as a Professor of Architecture at the University of Lagos. Although he collaborated with his wife on many projects, Gillian focused in historic preservation and architectural photography and documented several iconic buildings which existed in colonial Lagos (some of which have been demolished). They established their architectural firm named Godwin and Hopwood Architects in 1954. The firm’s name was later changed to Godwin Hopwood Kuye (GHK) Architects Limited in 1989. The couple became Nigerian citizens in 2013 after spending about 60 years living and practising as architects in Nigeria.

Godwin died on 12 February 2023, at the age of 94. Hopwood died on 6 November 2025, at the age 98.

== Career and Life Timeline ==
Timelines
| S/N | Career Level | Institution | Year |
John Godwin
| 1 | Professional Training | Architectural Association School | 1945 - 1950 |
| 2 | Associate | Royal Institute of British Architects | 1950 |
| 3 | Fellow | Royal Institute of British Architect | 1963 |
| 4 | Member | Nigerian Institute of Architects | 1969 |
| 5 | Fellow | Nigerian Institute of Architects | 1980 |
| 6 | Associate | Chartered Institute of Arbitrators | 1963 |
| 7 | Principal | Godwin and Hopwood | 1955 |
| 8 | Associate | Frank Mbanefo and Associates | 1964 |
| 9 | Consultant | Godwin and Hopwood, London | 1988 |
| 10 | Principal | Godwin Hopwood Kuye | 1989 |
Gillian Hopwood
| 1 | Professional Training | Architectural Association School | 1945 - 1950 |
| 2 | Associate | Royal Institute of British Architects | 1950 |
| 3 | Fellow | Royal Institute of British Architect | 1963 |
| 4 | Member | Nigerian Institute of Architects | 1969 |
| 5 | Fellow | Nigerian Institute of Architects | 1980 |
| 6 | Associate | Chartered Institute of Arbitrators | 1964 |
| 7 | Principal | Godwin and Hopwood | 1955 |
| 9 | Consultant | Godwin and Hopwood, London | 1988 -2003 |
| 10 | Principal | Godwin Hopwood Kuye | 1989 |
| 11 | Director | Godwin Hopwood Kuye | 2000 |
| 12 | National President | Soroptimist international of Nigeria | 1990 |
| 13 | Committee member | NIA Finance Committee | 1998 |
| 14 | President | Nigerian Britain Association | 2003 |

== Awards and Honours ==
| S/N | Award/Honours | Year |
|---|---|---|
| 1 | Leverhulme Scholar | 1945 |
| 2 | RIBA Henry Jervis Scholar | 1948 |
| 3 | Bratt Colbran Scholar | 1950 |
| 4 | Societe des Architects Diplome parle Government Metalist | 1950 |
| 5 | NIA Foundation Lecturer | 1988 |
| 6 | NIA Gold Merit Award | 1997 |
| 7 | Officer of the British Empire | 1975 |
| 8 | Officer of the Federal Republic of Nigeria | 2002 |

== Projects ==
- Allen and Hanbury House, Lagos 1956
- WAEC building, Yaba, Lagos
- Bookshop House, Lagos
- Niger House, Lagos
- Nestle Nigeria Plc Water Plant, Lagos.
- Faculty of Sciences building, University of Lagos
- GlaxoSmith Headquarters building, Lagos.
- Boyle street residential building, Lagos.
- Bishop Court Building, Ikeja, Lagos
- UBA Tower, Chief Osula Building, Benin
- Agbara Estate Town Centre Phase 1, 1983

== Published works ==
- Sand City: Lagos at 150. Kachifo. 2012. ISBN 978-9785108460.
- A Photographers Odyssey: Lagos Island 1954-2014. Kachifo. 2015.
- The Architecture of Demas Nwoko. Published by Farafina in 2007

== See also ==
- List of Nigerian architects
