= Cappa & D'Alberto PLC =

Nigerian construction company

Cappa & D'Alberto LTD is a building and construction company headquartered in Lagos. It was previously listed on the Nigerian Stock Exchange but chose to be delisted in 2009 while its shares can be traded over the Counter.

Founded in 1932, it is the oldest Italian construction company in Nigeria and it paved the way for other Italian construction companies to be established in Nigeria.

== History ==
Cappa & D'Alberto was established by Pietro Cappa and Viginio D'Alberto in 1932, immigrants from Italy who settled in Nigeria. D'Alberto was born in Roasio and Cappa was born in Gifflenga. Both businessmen had similar path to Africa, Cappa emigrated to British West Africa in 1924 and originally worked in Ghana before settling in Nigeria. While D'Alberto came to Ghana in 1929 before arriving in Nigeria in 1931. Both individuals met in Kaduna in 1931 and a year later founded Cappa and D'Alberto with office in Oil Mill St, Lagos. Grato Cappa, brother of Pietro later founded G Cappa in 1935. Early in its history, the firm was sustained with works for the Catholic mission within Lagos and Abeokuta. It later took jobs far from its Lagos base such as the construction of a government housing project in Yola which was completed on time, and later Yola hospital. The company then followed up with contracts in Sokoto and the construction of a camp in Jos. This jobs sustained the company through the great depression. During World War II, the firm's asset was briefly under the control of British authorities through the custodian of enemy properties, both D'Alberto and Cappa returned to Italy and the remaining Italian employees were interned in Jamaica until the end of the war. The partners returned in 1945 and re-established the firm, after taking control of their remaining assets.

In 1950, it secured a lease from Candido Da Rocha to erect a new office in Campbell St, Lagos.

The company's pre-independence projects in Lagos included Holy Cross Cathedral and Humoani Mosque which were built in the 1930s and later Kingsway Stores, Maternity Hospital, Lagos Island, Bristol Hotel and Western House. In Ibadan, it built Cocoa House.

In the 1950s, the firm delved into the property development sector with the establishment of Igbobi Development Company.

In the post-independence period, the firm built supporting housing facilities for construction workers at Kainji dam, NEPA office, Marina, Tafawa Balewa Square and was involved in the construction of the National Stadium at Surulere. The company also built factories including Dunlop in Ikeja and Arewa Textile, Kaduna. The firm's work at Kainji also included New Bussa township and resettlement of residents affected by the dam.

By the 1970s, the company was self supporting with its own equipment, cranes and vehicles.

The firm is one of the leading construction companies in Lagos Island, with works that include: Civic Center Towers, Mobil House, Zenon House, Union Marble building and Wings complex, Victoria Island.
