= Domenico D'Alberto =

Hungarian-Italian footballer

Personal information
- Date of birth: February 1, 1907
- Place of birth: Budapest, Transleithania, Austria-Hungary
- Date of death: December 1, 1968 (aged 61)
- Place of death: Budapest, Hungarian People's Republic
- Height: 1.65 m (5 ft 5 in)
- Position: Striker

Senior career*
Years	Team	Apps	(Gls)
19??–1931	Maglódi TC	?	(?)
1931–1935	Cagliari	108	(31)
1935–1937	Roma	44	(11)
1937–1938	Lucchese	6	(1)
- * Club domestic league appearances and goals

Domenico D'Alberto (born 1 February 1907 in Budapest; date of death unknown) was a Hungarian professional football player. He also held Italian citizenship.

He played for 3 seasons (50 games, 12 goals) in the Serie A for A.S. Roma and A.S. Lucchese Libertas 1905.

== Technical characteristics ==
Mancino, physically short and very agile, was equipped with an excellent technical background (which allowed him to perform numerous assists for teammates) and a good shot.

== Bibliography ==
- Valerio Vargiu, Cagliari 90 - The history and protagonists of the most loved team on the island from 1920 to 2010 - Volume 1, Cagliari, La Guida, 2010.
