= Independence House =

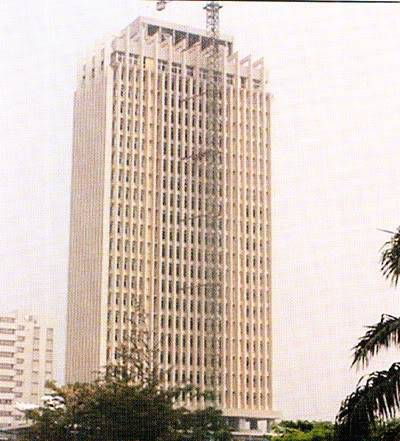
- Interactive map of the Independence House area
- Alternative names: Defense house

General information
- Type: Government office
- Location: Tafawa Balewa Square, Lagos
- Coordinates: 6°26′48.9″N 3°23′56″E
- Completed: 1961

Height
- Roof: 103 m (338 ft)

Technical details
- Floor count: 25

Design and construction
- Main contractor: G. Cappa

Independence House is a 25-storey office building, this long time edifice is located west of Tafawa Balewa Square, Onikan Lagos.

The project was commissioned by the British government as a testimonial to and as a good will support to Nigeria's independence in 1960.

The building is built of reinforced concrete, the building has housed major corporations and also the Defense headquarters under the Babangida administration and was which was commonly referred to as Defense House. In 1993, portions of it caught fire and since the incident, the building has not been managed properly.
