= Kings Tower, Lagos =

Kings Tower
- Former names: Kingsway Tower

General information
- Status: Topped-out
- Type: Mixed Use
- Location: Lagos, Alfred Rewane Way, Ikoyi, Lagos, Nigeria
- Completed: 2019; 7 years ago

Technical details
- Floor count: 15
- Floor area: 16,372 m^{2} (176,230 sq ft)

Design and construction
- Architect: Stefan Antoni Olmesdahl Truen Architects
- Developer: Messrs Sky View Towers Limited
- Structural engineer: Sutherland Engineers and Consultant’s Collaborative Partnership
- Main contractor: ITB Nigeria

The Kings Tower (formerly Kingsway Tower) is a 15-storey mixed-use building located at a junction on Alfred Rewane Road, Ikoyi, Lagos. It was designed by South African architects Stefan Antoni Olmesdahl Truen Architects and developed by Sky View Towers Limited. The building has twelve floors of office spaces spanning over 14,827 m^{2} (159,600 sq ft), two floors of retail spaces covering approximately 1,545 m^{2} (16,630 sq ft) (total site area of 32,800 m^{2} (353,000 sq ft)), a basement and a parking podium (three above grade and one below grade) for about 343 cars. Other facilities include a restaurant and cafe. Completion finalized in 2019.
