= Ilojo Bar =

Brazilian-styled historic building

Ilojo Bar & Restaurant
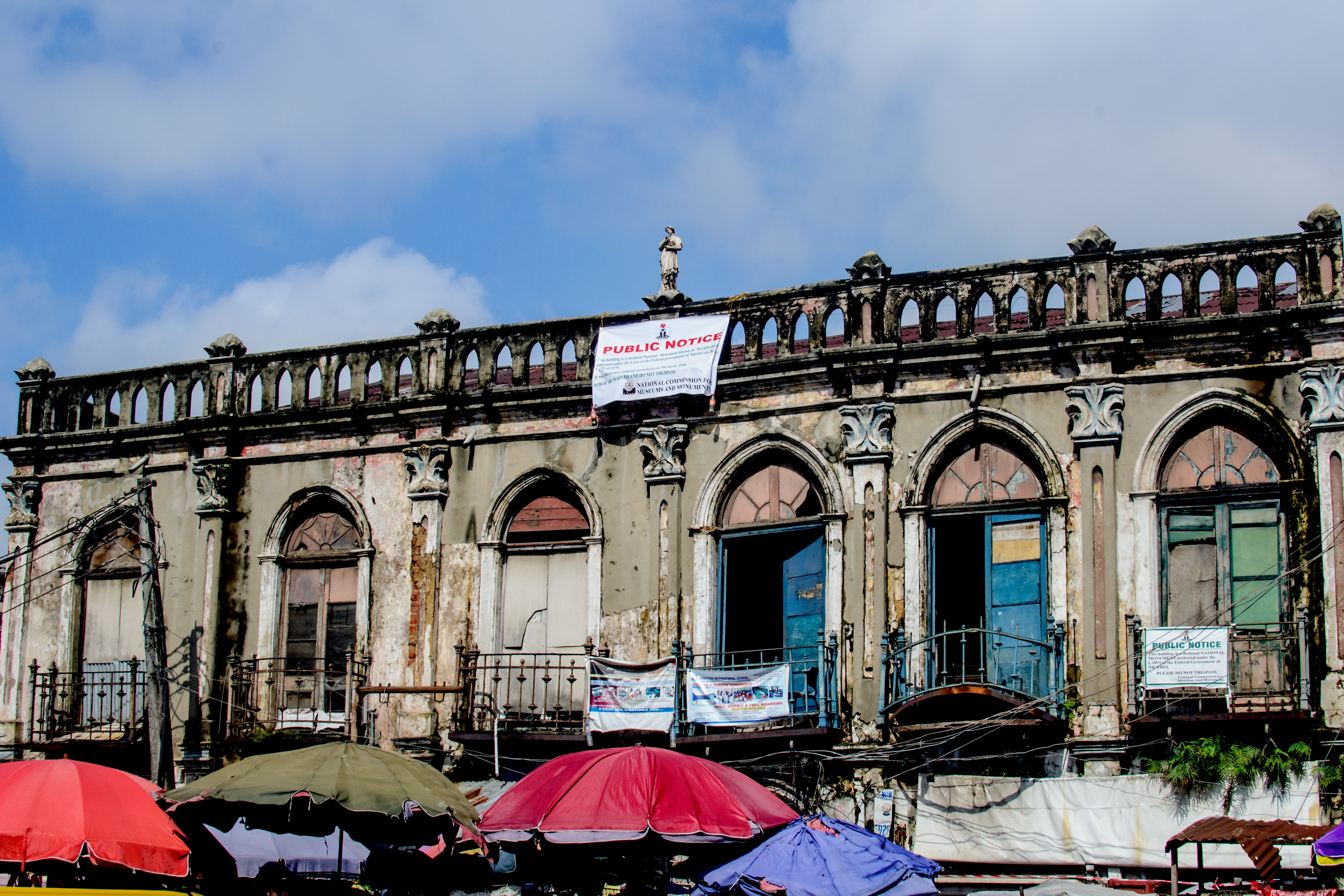

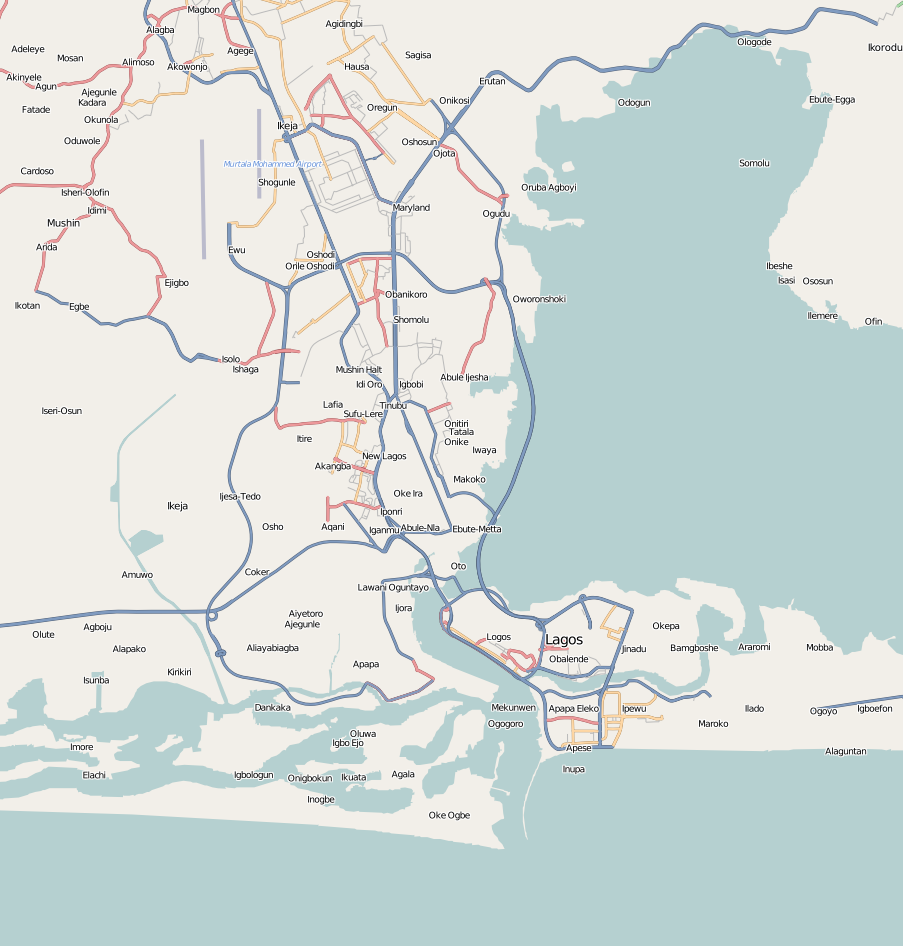
- Location within Lagos

General information
- Architectural style: Afro-Brazilian Architecture
- Location: Lagos Island, Lagos, Lagos State, Nigeria
- Coordinates: 6°27′14″N 3°23′24″E
- Completed: 1855
- Demolished: 11 September 2016

Technical details
- Material: Burnt Bricks

a service advert on a 1939 publication of Daily Times of Nigeria

Ilojo Bar, also called Olaiya House or Casa da Fernandez, was a Brazilian-styled historic building located near Tinubu Square in Lagos Island, Lagos State, Nigeria.

According to some sources, the building was originally built as a bar and restaurant in 1855 by the Fernandez family, who employed returning ex-slaves from Brazil and Cuba that had mastered the art of building while in the Western Hemisphere. However, in her master's thesis at Leiden University, Dutch journalist Femke van Zeijl proved that the building consists of two different halves, built much later, between 1903 and 1914. The right-hand, slightly narrower half actually belonged to José Amoedo Fernandez, who came from Galicia and who was a trader, not a former slave. The left half, which was a bit wider and contained the future Ilojo Bar, belonged to a certain Vicente Guedes. In 1903, José Amoedo Fernandez acquired the second half of the building (the one that would become the Ilojo Bar) and remodelled it after its right half. According to van Zeijl, he sold the entire building to a certain Napoleon Rey Couto in 1914.

Ilojo Bar was sold to Alfred Omolana Olaiya of the Olaiya family in 1933 and was declared a national monument in 1956 by the National Commission for Museums and Monuments.

== The name "Ilojo Bar" ==
After the house was sold to Alfred Omolona Olaiya in 1933, he renamed the building "Ilojo Bar" after his hometown of "Ilojo" in Ijesa Isu, Ekiti State.

== Demolition ==
The building was pulled down on Sunday, 11 September 2016, in suspicious circumstances during the Eid weekend in Lagos. The matter is still being investigated. The land is now under the control of the Lagos State Government.
