= List of schools in Lagos =

This is a list of secondary schools in Lagos, Nigeria.

== A ==
- A.D.R.A.O. International School, Victoria Island
- American International School of Lagos
- Apata Memorial High School
- Atlantic Hall, Epe

== B ==
- Babington Macaulay Junior Seminary, Ikorodu
- Binta International School, Ajao Estate
- Bridge House College, Ikoyi
- British International School Lagos, Victoria Island

== C ==
- Caleb British International School, Lekki
- Chrisland Schools
- CMS Grammar School, Bariga
- Corona School, Ikoyi

== D ==
- D-Ivy College
- Dowen College, Lekki

== E ==
- Eko Boys' High School, Mushin

== F ==
- Federal Government College, Ijanikin, Alasia
- Federal Science and Technical College, Yaba
- First Island School, Lekki

== G ==
- Good Shepherd Schools
- Government College, Ikorodu
- Grace Schools, Gbagada
- Grange School, Ikeja
- Greensprings School, Anthony Village/Ikoyi/Lekki

== H ==
- Holy Child College, Ikoyi

== I ==
- Ifako International School, Ifako-Ijaiye
- Igbobi College, Yaba
- Indian Language School, Ilupeju
- Institute for Industrial Technology
- International School Lagos, Akoka
- Isolog Schools, Ojodu
- Italian International School "Enrico Mattei", Lekki

== K ==
- King's College, Lagos Island
- Kingsfield College, Ikorodu
- KEY Academy

== L ==
- Lagoon Secondary School, Lekki
- Lagos Baptist Academy, Obanikoro
- Lagos Preparatory School, Ikoyi
- Lagos State Junior Model College, Badore
- Lagos State Junior Model College, Kankon
- Lagos State Model College, Igbonla, Epe
- Lagos State Model College, Kankon
- Lagos State Model Junior College Meiran, Oke Odo
- Lebanese Community School, Yaba
- Lekki British School, Lekki
- Longford International School, Ebute Metta
- Lycée Français Louis Pasteur de Lagos, Victoria Island

== M ==
- Meadow Hall School, Lekki
- Methodist Boys' High School, Victoria Island
- Methodist Girls' High School, Yaba
- Mictec Schools, Ojota

== Q ==
- Queen's College, Yaba

== R ==
- Redeemer's International Secondary School, Maryland

== S ==
- St. Francis Catholic Secondary School, Idimu
- St. Gregory's College, Ikoyi
- State High School, Ibereko
- SunRise Academy, Isolo

== V ==
- Vivian Fowler Memorial College for Girls, Ikeja

== See also ==
- Education in Nigeria
- List of schools in Nigeria
