= Lycée Français International =

Lycée Français International may refer to:

- Lycée Français International Marcel Pagnol (Paraguay) (Asunción)
- Lycée Français International Marcel Pagnol (Nigeria) (Abuja)
- Lycée Français International de Bangkok
- Lycée Français International de Pekin (Beijing)
- Lycée Français International de Dubaï
- Lycée Français International Victor Segalen (Hong Kong)
- Lycée Français International de Tokyo
