= Lycée Français International Marcel Pagnol =

Lycée Français International Marcel Pagnol may refer to:

- Lycée Français International Marcel Pagnol (Nigeria) - Abuja
- Lycée Français International Marcel Pagnol (Paraguay) - Asunción
