= Babington Macaulay Junior Seminary =

Babington Macaulay Junior Seminary (BMJS)
- BMJS

Location
- Agunfoye Lugbusi village Ikorodu, Lagos; Nigeria
- Coordinates: 6.6382°N 3.5990°E

Information
- School type: Secondary school
- Motto: To God Is Wisdom and Knowledge
- Religious affiliation: Church of Nigeria
- Denomination: Anglican
- Established: 18 October 1996
- Founder: The Most Rev. Dr.Joseph Abiodun Adetiloye
- Principal: The Ven. Dr. Bamidele Osunyomi
- Chaplain: The Ven. Dr. Bamidele Osunyomi
- Gender: Coeducational
- Age: 10 to 18
- Average class size: 36
- Language: English
- Campus size: 25 acres (10 ha)
- Houses: Archbishop Abiodun Adetiloye, Bishop Adelakun Howells, Rev.Thomas Babington Macaulay, Rev. Paley
- Colours: Purple and lilac
- Song: With God our strength
- Sports: Football, basketball, volleyball, athletics, table tennis, tennis, javelin, discus, shotput
- Nickname: BMJS
- National ranking: Top 50
- School fees: varies termly

Babington Macaulay Junior Seminary is a private co-educational school in Agunfoye-Lugbusi Village, Ikorodu, Lagos Nigeria. It is jointly owned by three Anglican dioceses in the Lagos Province – Lagos, Lagos West and Lagos Mainland, Church of Nigeria.

In 2003, it participated in a science competition against some other secondary schools in Nigeria, including Redeemer's International School, Effortswill High School, Supreme Education Centre, Caleb International School, Atlantic Hall and Grace High School.

The master plan for the school's campus was developed by A. T. Onajide Architects of Lagos.

BMJS's first principal was the then Ven. Akin Odejide, ably supported by Ven. Tunde Oduwole and host of senior tutors; Mr Itiolu, Mr Arabambi, Mrs Mofoluke Adebiyi, Mr Alagbala, Mr Jolayemi, Mr Babarinsa, Mrs Oki, Ms Akinrenmi and so on. The current principal of the school is The Venerable Dr. Bamidele Osunyomi Adesina (8 August 2018 – present). The school was awarded the best private school in Ikorodu in 2019.

== Principals ==
- The Rt.Revd Dr.Joseph Akinyemi Odejide (1996–2005)
- The Ven. OlaOluwa Adeyemi (2005–2017)
- The Ven. Tunde Oduwole (2017–2018)
- The Ven.Dr. Bamidele Osunyomi. (2018–present)

== BRESCAG competition ==
BRESCAG is an abbreviation for the pioneer schools that participated in the competition ~ Babington Macaulay Junior Seminary, Redeemers International Secondary School, Efforts will School, Solid Foundation School, Caleb International, Atlantic Hall and Grace High School respectively. The competition started in 1998 and has held every year since then at different venues allowing students to find what they excel in, both educationally and in sports. Competition include sports, athletics, science competitions, arts and debate.

== See also ==
- List of schools in Lagos
