= Sonia Irabor =

Nigerian writer, actress and filmmaker

- Born: 3 January 1990 (age 36); Lagos, Nigeria
- Education: University of Leicester; Drama Studio London
- Occupations: Writer, Filmmaker, Actress, Editor

Sonia Irabor (born 3 January 1990) is a Nigerian writer, actress, and filmmaker. She is the editor of Genevieve Magazine.

== Biography ==
Irabor was born to Soni and Betty Irabor, both media practitioners. Her mother is the founder and Editor-in-Chief of Genevieve Magazine while her father is a radio and TV broadcaster. In 2011, she graduated from the University of Leicester where she obtained a Bachelor of Science degree in Communications and Media Studies. She later attended the Drama Studio London where she obtained a Diploma in Professional Acting and graduated in 2016.

== Career ==
Irabor began her career by managing the "Teen Zone" column of Genevieve Magazine at the age of 13. She has worked as a radio presenter and producer and also in PR, Upon graduation from university, Irabor became Assistant Editor/UK Correspondent for Genevieve Magazine after which she was appointed Editor in 2017. As an actress, Sonia has appeared in a number of plays, films and TV series including Man Of Her Dreams, Inspector K, and Table.

== Filmography ==
- Slum King (2023)

== Recognition ==
In 2018, Sonia was named as one of Forbes Africa's 30-under-30 creatives. She was named as one of the 10 most powerful young persons in the media space on the YNaija power list.

Alongside her mother, Sonia was recognized as number 11 on the 2021 "25 Most Powerful Women in Journalism" list by the Women in Journalism Africa.
