= Joy Isi Bewaji =

Nigerian playwright and entrepreneur

- Born: June 8, 1977 (age 49)
- Education: Lagos State Model College; The Polytechnic, Ibadan
- Occupations: Nigerian essayist; Screenwriter; Playwright; Entrepreneur; Social affairs activist
- Known for: Writings and plays centred on cultural inappropriateness and religious anomalies
- Children: 2

Joy Isi Bewaji (born June 8, 1977) is a Nigerian essayist, screenwriter, playwright, new media entrepreneur and social affairs activist. Her writings and plays have been centred on cultural inappropriateness and religious anomalies. She identifies as a feminist, and her viewpoint on public issues have caused her to be described as a "modern-day fearless feminist" by the media.

== Early life and education ==
Bewaji had her high school education at Lagos State Model College, Kankon, Badagry. She studied Mass Communication in The Polytechnic, Ibadan. She went on to forge a career in the media.

She is divorced with two kids. In a 2016 interview, she stated that "she functions better alone".

== Career ==
Bewaji was managing director at Happenings radio and was an editor at Happenings magazine. She was previously the managing editor for Genevieve magazine. She is also the initiator of The Conversation that is centred around feminism, sexism and misogyny in Nigerian society. In 2016, she addressed the United Nations on issues around the girl-child.

Bewaji is a critic of popularity of religious practices among Nigerians, she describes the result as creating "vulnerable, self-centred and clearly delusional" citizens. She went further to espouse that religion was a mere instrument to provide temporary satisfaction in an imaginary setting. Her comments were criticized by many including Mark Anthony Osuchukwu from YNaija, who stated that she should mind her business in an article titled, Hallelujah Challenge vs the Joy Isi Bewaji Challenge.

In 2014, she unveiled Tina’s Shoes & Love Issues, which is an audio series made for women. During a 2014 interview, she revealed that she is close to publishing some of her books.

In 2016, she organized and moderated a session titled Gender Equality And The Funk of Feminism, where the discussants raised issues that affects women in achieving their full potentials. Speaking on the motivation for her play, Story of my Vagina (2016), Bewaji explained that "women have refused to evolve beyond the traditional stereotypes society has imposed on them". The theatrical performance span through gender discrimination, domestic violence, religious segmentation and cultural oppression towards women.

At the 2016 UN International Youth Day, Bewaji identified religion, culture and patriarchy as the main cause of poverty in Nigeria. She advised youths to disregard all they've learnt from the older generations, stating that they wouldn't go far in life if they continue to dwell in them.

Bewaji has been described as a modern-day feminist. Bellanaija went further to explain that she seeks a philosophical position in reinventing how women view themselves in the society. She also spoke concerning feminism in Harvard University.

Bewaji is also a vocal critic of the lyrical content of top Nigerian musicians, who she claimed reduced women to a commodity that can be bought with resources to gain sexual satisfaction. She went further to explain that this circle makes it inevitable for the society to see women as materialistic.

In 2017, Bewaji advised Nigerian married women to stand their ground against any man that do not value them, specifically narrating why their marital vows should not be of a higher priority than their safety and happiness.

According to Guardian, her play Marriage Onions In Wedding Blues (2017) is a provided theatrical answer to several inert challenges and questions faced by married Nigerian women, including the influence of the husband's family in the marriage and the stereotypical duties of a Nigerian wife. The play was performed at Freedom Park, Lagos State on March 5, with several Nollywood actors including Osas Ighodaro and Damilola Adegbite in major roles.

In 2019, Bewaji released "Las Las, We'll be Alright", a handbook which is a documentation of her thoughts as a social and cultural critic on the idiosyncrasies of Nigerians, the lives, lies and beliefs of the citizens.

The controversial nature of the topics she addresses and her understanding on feminism have caused her to be criticized by many stakeholders including, Adegoke Adeola, a media personality with Ogun State Broadcasting Corporation, fellow feminist, Omotoyosi Ogunbanwo, Uchegbu Ndubuisi, a lecturer at University of Nigeria amongst others.

In 2021 Isi Joy Bewaji, was called out by Instagram blogger GistMerchant in relation to the fraud case of Grace Osei, a fraudster wanted by Interpol.
