= Chinenye =

Chinenye audio is a Nigerian Igbo language name. The name may refer to:

- Chinenye Akinlade (born 1980), Nigerian beauty pageant titleholder
- Chinenye Fidelis (born 1993), Nigerian female weightlifter
- Chiney Ogwumike (born 1992), Nigerian American Basketball player
- Chinenye Nworah Nigerian film Producer
- Chinenye Ochuba-Akinlade Nigerian beauty pageant title holder
