= Lagos State Model Junior College Meiran =

Boarding school in Lagos State, Nigeria

Location
- 233–275 Meiran Road, Oke Odo; Lagos, Lagos State; Nigeria
- 6.6350644°N 3.2721302°E

Information
- Type: boarding
- Motto: Excellence knows no gender
- Established: 6 January 2003 (23 years ago)
- Founder: Lagos State Government
- Status: Open
- Principal: Mrs H. O. A. Adesanmi
- Gender: Mixed
- Campus type: Urban
- Website: https://lsmjcmeiran.org/

Lagos State Model Junior College Meiran is a state owned secondary school located in Oke Odo, in the northern part of the city of Lagos, Nigeria.

== History ==
Before 2003, junior and senior secondary schools in Lagos State were under single administrative control. The government through the Lagos State Ministry of Education mandated all secondary schools in the state to be partitioned into junior (JSS1-3) and senior (SS1-3). This was what led to the establishment of the Lagos State Model Junior College Meiran from Lagos State Model College Meiran (founded on 19 February 1988) on January 6, 2003. The other newly formed colleges in Lagos State where the ones in Badore, Igbonla, Kankon and Igbokuta.

The first principal of the newly formed school in Meiran was Mrs. T. D. Kuti, who led the school until 2009. She was succeeded by Mrs. D. A. Adeyeye (2009 to 2015), Mr A. I. Olatunde (2015 to 2017) and Mrs. O. A. Oyedokun starting 19 November 2017. O. A. Oyedokun was succeeded by Mrs H. O. A. Adesanmi on 15 July 2021.

The student hostel was renovated in 2017.

== Facilities ==
The school has health facilities with trained staff, serves meals, has computer laboratories, power supply by standby Solar cell panels (since 20 January 2015), hostel accommodation and ventilated classrooms.

== Principals ==
- Mrs. T. D. Kuti, 6 January 2003 to 7 July 2009
- Mrs D. A. Adeyeye, 8 July 2009 to 9 March 2015
- Mr A. I. Olatunde 12 March 2015 to 18 September 2017
- Mrs O. A. Oyedokun since 19 September 2018
- Mrs H.O.A Adesanmi since 15 July 2021

== Alumni ==
- David Oyelowo (* 1976), actor
- Shank Comics (* 1997), comedian

== Notable honours ==
- 2016: Winner of the National Robotics competition in the junior category – for this win they took part in the World Robot Olympiad 2016, which took place in the India Expo Center in New Delhi, India.
- 2017: 1st runner up of the National ICT Key Application competition
