= Aderinokun =

- Language: Yoruba

Origin
- Region of origin: West Africa

Adérìnókun is a Yoruba surname meaning "the crown or royalty walks on the ocean". Notable people with the surname include:

- David Olumide Aderinokun, Nigerian politician
- Ire Aderinokun, Nigerian software developer
- Tayo Aderinokun, Nigerian entrepreneur
