= Slum King =

2023 Nigerian television crime series

- Genre: Drama
- Written by: Eric Achimien; Donald Tombia
- Directed by: Dimeji Ajibola
- Original languages: English; Pidgin; Yoruba; Isoko; Igbo
- No. of seasons: 1
- No. of episodes: 7

Production
- Executive producer: Chinenye Chichi Nworah
- Producer: Chinenye Chichi Nworah
- Production locations: Lagos, Nigeria
- Camera setup: Multi camera
- Running time: 40

Original release
- Network: DStv Family channel 151; GOtv channel 12
- Release: October 8, 2023

Slum King is a Nigerian 10-part limited crime series, set in Lagos, Nigeria. It premiered on Africa Magic Showcase, DStv channel 151 and GOtv channel 12 on 8 October 2023.

It stars Tobi Bakre, Olarotimi Fakunle, Idia Aisien, Elvina Ibru, Hermes Iyele, Bolaji Ogunmola, Sonia Irabor, Gideon Okeke, Jidekene Achufusi amongst others

== Synopsis ==
Slum King follows the life of Edafe, a young boy who witnesses the tragic murder of his parents, a tragedy he blames himself for after forgetting to lock the door. Haunted by guilt and scarred by trauma, Edafe's journey takes him from a troubled youth in the slums to the powerful and magnetic figure known as Maje, the revered king of the slums.

== Casts ==
- Tobi Bakre as Edafe/Maje
- Teniola Aladese as Yagazie
- Olarotimi Fakunle as Imole
- Sonia Irabor as Dr. Kate Okonkwo
- Idia Aisien
- Elvina Ibru
- Hermes Iyele
- Bolaji Ogunmola
- Gideon Okeke
- Jidekene Achufusi
- Funsho Adeolu

== Episodes ==
No. overall	No. in season	Title	Directed by	Written by	Original release date
1	1	"Episode 1"	Dimeji Ajibola	Eric Achimien & Donald Tombia	October 8, 2023
The series begins with young Edafe witnessing the brutal murder of his family by armed robbers, a tragedy he blames on his own failure to lock the door. This traumatic event fills him with guilt and fuels a deep-seated desire for revenge. He soon began staying with his grandma in the gritty slums of Oro Lede where he is forced to live amongst pickpockets, armed robbers, and bullies.
2	2	"Episode 2"	Dimeji Ajibola	Eric Achimien & Donald Tombia	October 15, 2023
Edafe focuses on his passion for football and school life, where he earns a scholarship after a standout game. Around him, friends face personal challenges: Dare experiences a traumatic event that leads to violent consequences, and Banjo and Kaima navigate early parenthood. A celebratory day turns tragic, as Edafe’s path changes dramatically due to an altercation with Dare, ultimately leading to Edafe’s imprisonment. Meanwhile, a new antagonist, Tequila, emerges, setting off a series of additional conflicts.
3	3	"Episode 3"	Dimeji Ajibola	Eric Achimien & Donald Tombia	October 22, 2023
4	4	"Episode 4"	Dimeji Ajibola	Eric Achimien & Donald Tombia	October 29, 2023
5	5	"Episode 5"	Dimeji Ajibola	Eric Achimien & Donald Tombia	November 5, 2023
6	6	"Episode 6"	Dimeji Ajibola	Eric Achimien & Donald Tombia	November 12, 2023
7	7	"Episode 7"	Dimeji Ajibola	Eric Achimien & Donald Tombia	November 19, 2023
8	8	"Episode 8"	Dimeji Ajibola	Eric Achimien & Donald Tombia	November 26, 2023
9	9	"Episode 9"	Dimeji Ajibola	Eric Achimien & Donald Tombia	December 3, 2023
10	10	"Episode 10"	Dimeji Ajibola	Eric Achimien & Donald Tombia	December 10, 2023
