= Apata Memorial High School =

Location
- Lagos; Nigeria
- Coordinates: 6.5205°N 3.3215°E

Information
- Type: Coeducational
- Established: 1980
- Enrollment: 1550

Apata Memorial High School is a military-style privately owned boarding school in Lagos, Nigeria. It was founded in 1980 by retired Nigerian Army Brigadier-General S. O. Apata. The school has about 1550 pupils and 150 teachers. The school accommodates boarding and day students.

== Notable alumni ==
- David Olumide Aderinokun, Nigerian politician
- Modupe Ozolua, Nigerian entrepreneur
- Niniola, Nigerian musician
- Teni Apata, also known as Teni the entertainer and Teni Makanaki

== See also ==
- List of schools in Lagos
