= Franco-Nigeria Chamber of Commerce and Industry =

Franco-Nigeria Chamber of Commerce and Industry (FNCCI) is a non-governmental and non-profit organization focused on promoting economic, commercial and financial relationships between France and Nigeria. Established in 1985, FNCCI facilitates trade, investment, business exchanges, advocates for private sector interests and fostering networking and collaboration between French and Nigerian companies. FNCCI is part of CCI France International, a global network representing over 35,000 members in 95 countries.

== History ==
Franco-Nigerian Chamber of Commerce and Industry was founded in 1985 with a stated mission to “develop and foster economic, commercial and financial relationships between France and Nigeria”. FNCCI is part of CCI France International, a global network representing over 35,000 members in 95 countries. As of 2025, FNCCI has over 600 member companies from various sectors including finance, energy, technology, engineering and manufacturing.

== Operations ==
FNCCI offers its members platforms for information sharing, market intelligence, business consultancy, industry reports, and supports members with logistics, recruitment, and business development services. FNCCI engages in consultations with government bodies in France and Nigeria on issues of interests to its members. In Nigeria, it partners government agencies including Customs Service, National Agency for Food and Drug Administration and Control (NAFDAC), Nigerian Investment Promotion Commission (NIPC), National Drug Law Enforcement Agency (NDLEA).

== Presidents ==
- Ambassador O. Ogunsulire (1985 - 1987)
- Henri Ossamann (1987 - 1989)
- Molade Okoya-Thomas (1989 - 1992)
- Jean-Pierre Lamarque (1992 - 1994)
- Y.A. Oyeleke (1994 - 1996)
- Robert Sessac (1996 - 1997)
- Akin Laguda (1997 - 2000)
- Christian Villa (2000 - 2001)
- I.U.W. Osisiogu (2001 - 2004)
- Laurent Morel-Francoz (2004 - 2006)
- S.A.O. Jegede (2006 - 2008)
- Marcel Hochet (2008 - 2014)
- Oye Hassan-Odukale (2014 -2018)
- Eric Jeanneau (2018 - 2020)
- Usman Mohammed (2020 - 2024)
- Guillaume Niarfeix (2024 - present)
