= Shank Comics =

Nigerian online comedian

- Born: Adesokan Adedeji Emmanuel; 23 March 1997 (age 29); Iwajowa, Oyo State, Nigeria
- Education: Obafemi Awolowo University
- Occupations: Comedian, Online streamer

Adesokan Adedeji Emmanuel (born 23 March 1997) professionally known by his stage name Shank Comics, is a Nigerian actor, comedian, online streamer and media influencer. He is widely known for his slogan Lit Gang

== Early life ==
Adesokan Adedeji Emmanuel was born on 23 March 1997 in Iwere-Ile, Iwajowa-Oyo State, and grew up in Olambe, Ogun State. He is born to Nigerian parents and is a descendant of the Yoruba people from the western part of Nigeria. Emmanuel had his primary education at Goodness and Mercy Private School in Olambe, Ogun State, and Lagos State Model College Meiran for his secondary education. He studied Electrical Engineering at Obafemi Awolowo University in Ile-Ife, Osun State for his tertiary education.

== Career ==
Shank began creating memes for fun and sharing them with his friends while chatting. He was encouraged by his friends to take them more seriously. In 2017, he began skit-making and rose to stardom during the COVID-19 pandemic. In 2020, he gained popularity on Instagram and was celebrated three years after by Meta, during its "Made by Africa, Loved by the World" Campaign, among other content creators. He considers Kevin Hart, Bovi, and Trevor Noah as his role model.

On 6 April 2022, Shank launched his online store Lit Gang, where he sells branded head wears like head warmers, face caps, and bucket hats. On 23 June 2022, in an interview with Cool FM Nigeria, he reveals how he started content creation from boredom in 2020, after relocating to Lagos in November 2019, and why he cannot accept 10 million naira for endorsement deals. On 6 July 2022, Shank took to his Twitter handle to announce the arrival of his first car. On 1 December 2022, he appeared on YouTube end-of-year Top 10 Breakout-Creators List.

In March 2026, Shank Comics won the Best Streamer award at the SiGMA Africa Awards held in Cape Town, South Africa, recognising his impact in the African streaming space.

== Controversy ==
On 29 May 2023, he was dragged on Twitter following the release of his recent skit titled: If Joseph was a Nigerian. Many people expressed disappointment with the skit and described it as an insult to Christianity. Thereafter he apologized after taking down the video from his YouTube channel and social platforms.
