= Mictec Schools =

Mictec Schools is a co-education school located at Ojota, in Lagos State, Nigeria.

== Background ==
Mictec Schools comprises crèche, early learning, primary and secondary school. It is directed by Micheal O.K Tejuosho. The school runs a hostel accommodation for non-day students. In 2010, the school ended its session with a Christmas party.

== See also ==
- Education in Nigeria
- List of schools in Lagos
