= Good Shepherd Schools =

Good Shepherd School

Information
- Type: Private, fully residential
- Motto: Truth, Trust, Triumph
- Website: Official websdite

The Good Shepherd Schools is a multi-campus school comprising nursery, primary, and secondary school.

It is located in Lagos, Nigeria.

The Ketu annex was established in 1993 and its 13th year valedictory service was held in 2011.

== See also ==
- List of schools in Lagos
