= Seni Sulyman =

Nigerian entrepreneur

- Born: Tahir Omoseni Sulyman; 1985 (age 40–41); Lagos, Nigeria
- Education: SSCE, Atlantic Hall School, Epe, Lagos; MBA, Harvard Business School; Bachelor of Engineering (B.Eng.), Electrical Engineering, Northwestern University
- Occupations: Business executive, entrepreneur
- Known for: Country Director (Nigeria) and Vice President, Global Operations Andela
- Spouse: Motunrayo Agusto

Seni Sulyman (born Tahir Omoseni Sulyman in 1985) is a Nigerian entrepreneur and was Vice President of Global Operations at Andela, a global engineering as a service business. He started out as the Director of Operations for Andela in Nigeria and became the Country Director of Nigeria six months later. Sulyman is also a member of the Board of Directors at FATE Foundation.

== Early life and education ==
Sulyman was born in Lagos, Nigeria. He attended secondary school education at Atlantic Hall School, then completed his secondary education at the American School of Paris. Sulyman attended Northwestern University and earned a degree in Electrical Engineering. He furthered his education at Harvard Business School, where he earned an MBA.

== Career ==
Sulyman began his career at the Chicago and Toronto offices of Bain & Company, a global management consulting firm, as an associate consultant. He then moved to Silicon Valley as a Manager in the global strategy team at Hewlett-Packard during the tenure of CEO Mark Hurd. In 2012, Sulyman left HP and travelled to Lagos, Nigeria for a short stay at the Principal Investments Division of CardinalStone Partners (now CardinalStone Capital Advisers). The following year, in 2013, Sulyman returned to Nigeria for an internship, turning down offers from global technology companies like Google and Box.

After his MBA, Sulyman returned to Nigeria full-time to lead the creation of a new business-focused jet airline at Bristow Group, which had an industry leading 98% on-time-departure record. Sulyman joined Andela as Director of Operations in Nigeria in May 2016, then moved into the role of Country Director for Nigeria in January 2017. In the two years under his leadership, Andela Nigeria grew by over 400%, and moved into a modernized technology HQ in Lagos. Sulyman transitioned into the role of Vice President of Global Operations in 2018.

== Recognition ==
In recognition of Andela's achievements during Sulyman's tenure, the company emerged as #1 on Jobberman’s Best 100 places to work in Nigeria list (2018) and earned the US Secretary of State Award for Corporate Excellence.

== Personal life ==
Sulyman is married to Motunrayo Agusto, a fashion designer and entrepreneur, in 2018.
