= Lagos State Junior Model College Badore =

Location
- Badore road, Badore, Ajah; Eti-Osa, Lagos State; Nigeria

Information
- Type: boarding
- Motto: Knowledge is power
- Established: 6 January 2003 (23 years ago)
- Founder: Lagos State Government
- Status: Open
- Principal: Mrs. Soyoye
- Teaching staff: 35 (2013)
- Gender: Mixed
- Enrollment: 425 (2015 estimate)
- Campus type: Urban
- Colours: Green and Red

Lagos State Junior Model College Badore is a state owned secondary school located in Badore village, Eti-Osa Local government area of Lagos State.

== History ==
Before 2003, junior and senior secondary schools in Lagos State were a single administrative control. The government through the Lagos State Ministry of Education mandated all secondary schools in the state to be partitioned into junior (JSS1-3) and senior (SS1-3). This was what led to the establishment of Lagos State Junior Model College Badore from Lagos State Model College Badore (founded on 19 February 1988) on January 6, 2003. The emergence of the newly created school led to the appointment of Mrs. Sidikat Titilayo Smith as the first principal of the school.

== Facilities ==
Lagos State Junior Model College Badore has hostel facilities that accommodates all her students, thus operating a boarding only system.

== Principals ==
- Mrs Sidikat Titilayo Smith, January 2003 to 2011
- Mr F. A. Lawal, July 15, 2011, to 2017
- Mr Kayode Akinboro 13-9-17 to 10-9-19
- Mr R .T Ajetunmobi 10-9-2019 to 11/03/2024
- Ms S.O Lawal 10/03/2024 to 20/06/2024(acting)
- Mrs B.O Soyoye 21/06/2024 till date

== Notable honours ==
- Best Junior Secondary School in Education District 111. (2011 by Ministry of Education)
- First position at Festival of Arts and Culture in Storytelling category (2011 by Ministry of Education)
- Second position in Quiz competition marking Second anniversary of Climate Change clubs. (2011 by Ministry of Environment)
- First position in Essay competition. (2012 by Nigeria Conservation Foundation)
- First position in Agriculture Debate (2012 by Poultry Association of Nigeria)
