= The Mission Song =

2006 novel by John le Carré

- First UK edition
- Author: John le Carré
- Genre: thriller/espionage
- Published: 2006; Hodder & Stoughton, UK; Little, Brown, US
- Media type: Print
- Pages: 352
- ISBN: 0316016748

The Mission Song is a thriller/espionage novel by British writer John le Carré, published in 2006. Set against the background of the chaotic East Congo, the story involves the planning of a Western-backed coup in the province of Kivu, told from the worm's-eye view of the hapless interpreter. Although the events are fictional, the book evokes a rich and detailed picture of the political and ethnic tensions of the region, highlighting the greed and amorality of local bureaucrats and Western interests, and calling attention to the apathy of the British press about the continuing humanitarian crisis of the Congo War.

== Plot summary ==
Bruno Salvador, known as Salvo, is the orphaned, illegitimate son of an Irish Catholic missionary and a native Congolese woman. He is educated in England, and as a fluent speaker and aficionado of "disappearing indigenous languages of Eastern Congo", he finds a natural calling as a specialist interpreter, employed by London's hospitals, law courts, city corporations, and British intelligence.

Salvo has a passionate extramarital affair with a Congolese nurse, Hannah. En route from a rendezvous with Hannah to a party thrown for his journalist wife, he is offered an urgent job by his handler at the Ministry of Defence to serve as an interpreter at a conference between Congolese warlords and their putative Western backers, the nameless "Syndicate". He learns that their objective is to eject Kivu's Rwandan occupiers and install a liberal, benevolent politician dubbed "the Mwangaza" as the head.

Whisked to a nameless island in the North Sea, Salvo is set to his task. As well as interpreting at the conference, he must also decipher recordings from hidden microphones festooning the island. Unbeknown to his employers, Salvo listens in while one of the Congolese delegates, who has shown signs of defecting from the agreement, is tortured by his employers. It becomes apparent that the Syndicate's real objective is to plunder the coltan and other mineral wealth of Kivu, and the Mwangaza is no more than a puppet. At the end of the conference, Salvo pockets the tapes and his notes before returning to London.

Salvo attempts, with Hannah's help, to alert the authorities and the press and prevent the coup. Due to their efforts, the Syndicate panics and launches the operation ahead of schedule, causing it to fail. Salvo is arrested and stripped of his British citizenship. At the end of the novel Salvo languishes in a holding facility for asylum seekers, awaiting his deportation to the Congo where he will be reunited with Hannah.

== Critical reception ==
The book received positive reviews from critics. The review aggregator Metacritic reported the book had an average score of 63 out of 100, based on 25 reviews. The Mission Song was featured on BBC Radio 4's Book at Bedtime programme from October 2 to October 13 of 2006, read by Paterson Joseph. David Oyelowo narrates the 2007 audiobook for The Mission Song. Of his performance, AudioFile magazine states, "Think of David Oyelowo as a single musician playing all the instruments in a symphony. That is essentially what he manages in this inspired performance of John le Carré's suspense novel... Can it really have been only one man in the narrator's recording booth? This virtuoso performance makes that seem impossible."
