= Institut français du Nigéria =

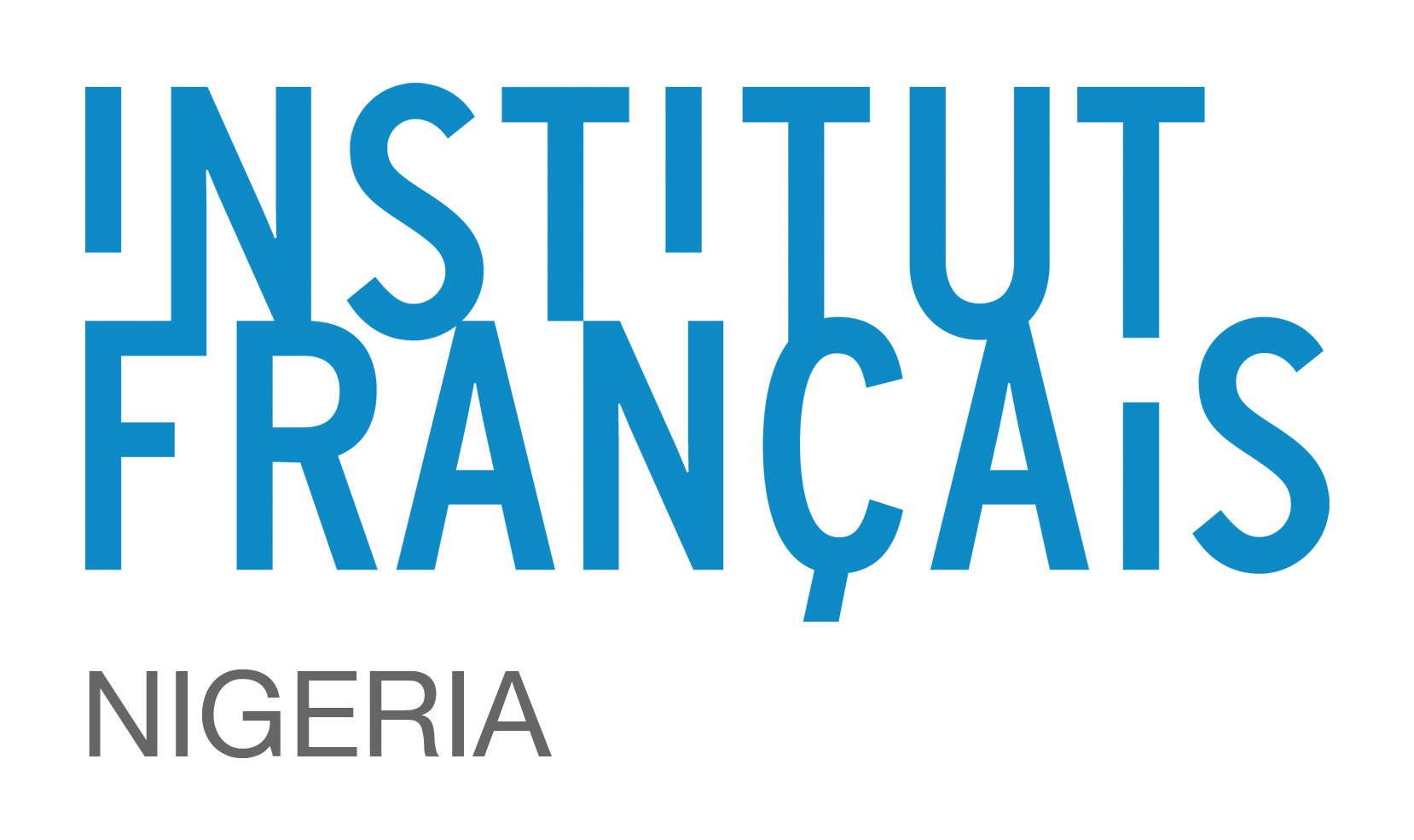
- Location: 52, Libreville Crescent Wuse 2, Abuja
- Website: https://www.institutfr-nigeria.org/

The French Institute in Nigeria (in French: Institut français du Nigéria) (IFN) is part of the worldwide organisation of Instituts français (French Institutes). The Abuja institute is the only in the country.

== Educative role ==
The primary goal of the institute is to provide French lessons, courses and examinations for children, students and professionals alike.

This institute counts over 2000 students every year, from various backgrounds. The IFN is also accredited to deliver international language certifications like: DELF, DALF, TCF, DELF Prim, DELF Junior and the TCF Québec.

== Cultural activities ==
The institute's cultural center participates in the local and national art scene, by organising hundreds of cultural events every year, on a local, regional or national basis. It also participates to external events, within the promotion of friendly ties between France and other francophone countries and Nigeria. In addition to these events, the center offers regular classes in: piano, guitar, singing, dance and theatre and visual arts lessons.

== General information ==
The IFN shelters a media hub and a library with over 1000 francophone documents accessible to the wider audience, as well as an online ‘culturethèque’ (online cultural library) proposing an additional couple of thousands of documents.

== See also ==
French schools in Nigeria:

- Lycée Français Louis Pasteur de Lagos
- École Française Marcel Pagnol (Abuja)
