= St. Francis Catholic Secondary School, Nigeria =

St. Francis Catholic Secondary School
- Idimu, Lagos; Nigeria

Information
- Type: Private secondary school
- Motto: Magis in love and service
- Religious affiliation: Catholicism
- Denomination: Jesuit
- Patron saint: Francis Xavier
- Established: 1990 (36 years ago)
- Founder: Francis Cusimano
- Administrator: Koshoffa Francis Omotayo
- Grades: 7-12
- Age: 10 to 18
- Website: stfrancismagis.org

St. Francis Catholic Secondary School (abbreviated as SFCSS) is a private Catholic secondary school, located in Idimu, Lagos, Nigeria. The school was founded in 1990 by Francis Cusimano and is run by the North-West Africa Province of the Society of Jesus.

== Academic performance ==
St. Francis students finished second and third nationally in the National Examination Council exam in 2014, while student Oluwatobi Raji also scored good results. The school also emerged as the winner of the schools challenge at kody and the kids, 2015. St. Francis was ranked 20th among the top 100 schools in Nigeria in 2015. In 2016, the school hosted the 18th Inter-House Sports competition (track and field competition).

== Notable alumni ==
- Tana Adelana – TV-host and VJ
- Chika Ike – Nollywood actress

== See also ==
- Catholic Church in Nigeria
- Education in Nigeria
- List of schools in Lagos
- List of Jesuit schools
