= D-Ivy College =

School in Nigeria

- Lagos; Nigeria

Information
- School type: Boarding school
- Established: 1998; 28 years ago
- Age: 3 to 18

D-Ivy College is a school located in Lagos, Nigeria.

It was established in 1998 to provide an international education.

The school is a co-educational boarding and day school for children aged from 3 to 18 years.

== Qualifications ==
The school offers the British curriculum, i.e., International General Certificate of Secondary Education and A-level. It also offers the International Baccalaureate Diploma.

== See also ==
- Education in Nigeria
- List of schools in Lagos
