= David Oyelowo =

British actor (born 1976)

David Oyelowo OBE
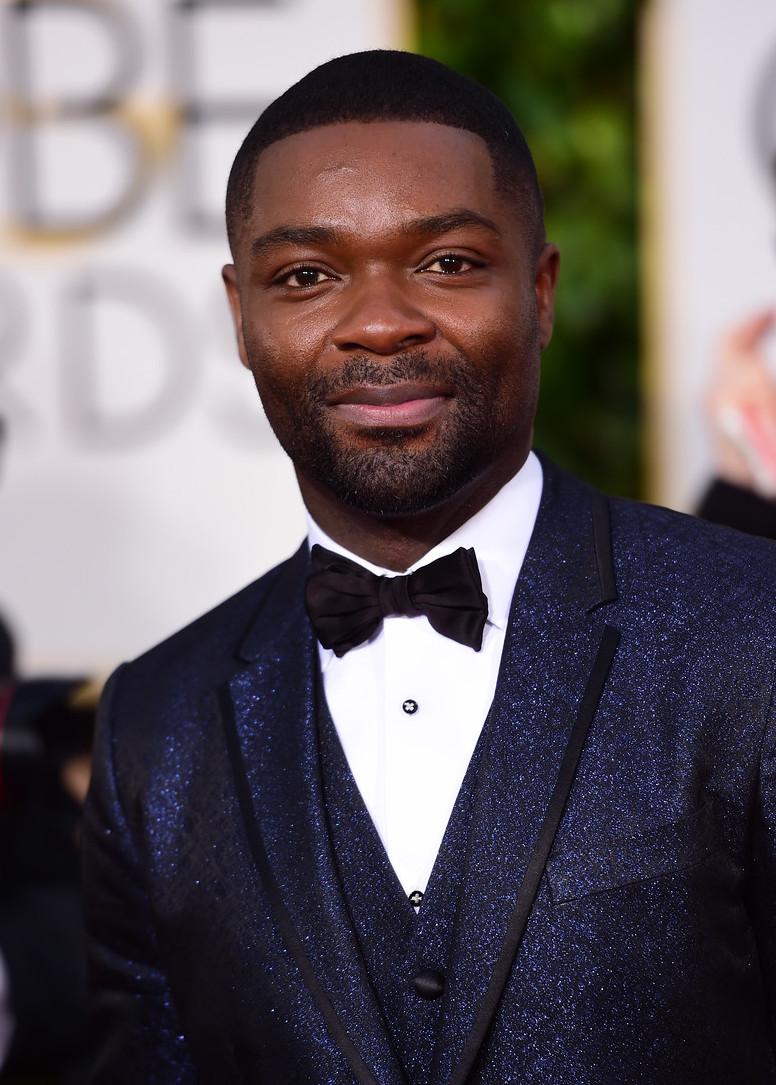
- Oyelowo in 2015
- Born: David Oyetokunbo Oyelowo; 1 April 1976 (age 50); Oxford, Oxfordshire, England
- Other name: David O.
- Citizenship: British; Nigerian; American
- Education: London Academy of Music and Dramatic Art
- Occupations: Actor; director; producer
- Years active: 1998–present
- Spouse: Jessica Watson (m. 1998)
- Children: 4

David Oyetokunbo Oyelowo (/oʊˈjɛloʊwoʊ/ oh-yeh-LOH-woh; Yoruba pronunciation; born 1 April 1976) is a British actor, director, and producer. His accolades include a Critics' Choice Award and two NAACP Image Awards as well as nominations for three Golden Globe Awards, two Primetime Emmy Awards, a Screen Actors Guild Award, and a BAFTA Award. In 2016, he was appointed an Officer of the Order of the British Empire (OBE) for his services to drama.

Oyelowo rose to prominence for portraying Martin Luther King Jr. in the biographical drama film Selma (2014) and Peter Snowden in the HBO film Nightingale (2014), both of which garnered him critical acclaim. He also achieved praise for his roles as Louis Gaines in The Butler (2013), Seretse Khama in A United Kingdom (2016) and Robert Katende in Queen of Katwe (2016). He has also played supporting roles in the films Rise of the Planet of the Apes (2011), The Help (2011), Lincoln (2012), Red Tails (2012), and Jack Reacher (2012).

On television, Oyelowo has played MI5 officer Danny Hunter in the British drama series Spooks (2002–2004) and Javert in the BBC miniseries Les Misérables (2018). He also provided the voice for Agent Alexsandr Kallus in the Lucasfilm Animation series Star Wars Rebels (2014–2018) and Holston Becker in the Apple+ drama series Silo. He stars in and co-produces the 2023 Paramount+ western series Lawmen: Bass Reeves.

== Early life and education ==
Oyelowo was born on 1 April 1976 in Oxford, Oxfordshire, to Nigerian parents. His father, Stephen, is from Oyo State, South West Nigeria, while his mother is from South East Nigeria. He was brought up as a Baptist. He grew up on an estate in Tooting Bec, south London, until he was six, when his family moved to Lagos, Nigeria, where his father worked for the national airline and his mother worked for a railway company. Oyelowo grew up idolising Sidney Poitier and Denzel Washington.

Oyelowo is an omoba (or prince) of the Yoruba people in the Nigerian chieftaincy system, his grandfather having been king of "a part of Oyo State called Awe". He has commented of his background: "It sounds way more impressive than it actually is. There are so many royal families in Africa", "royal families are a dime a dozen in Nigeria"; "what we think of as royalty in the UK is very different to royalty in Nigeria: if you were to throw a stone there, you would hit about 30 princes. So, it's a bit more like being the Prince of Islington: it was useful for getting dates but probably not much else."

Oyelowo attended a "military-style" boarding-school named Lagos State Model College Meiran (now Lagos State Model Junior College Meiran. His family returned to London when Oyelowo was 14, settling in Islington.

While enrolled in theatre studies at City and Islington College, his teacher suggested that he become an actor. Oyelowo enrolled for a year in an acting foundation course, at the London Academy of Music and Dramatic Art (LAMDA). He finished his three-year training in 1998.

He also spent time with the National Youth Theatre.

== Career ==
=== Stage ===
He began his stage career in 1999 when he was offered a season with the Royal Shakespeare Company playing roles in Ben Jonson's Volpone, as the title character in Oroonoko (which he also performed in the BBC radio adaptation) and Shakespeare's Antony and Cleopatra (1999) alongside Guy Henry, Frances de la Tour and Alan Bates. However, he is best known for his next stage performance as King Henry VI in the Royal Shakespeare Company's 2001 productions of Shakespeare's trilogy of plays about the king as a part of its season This England: The Histories. In a major landmark for colour-blind casting, Oyelowo was the first black actor to play an English king in a major production of Shakespeare, and although this casting choice was initially criticised by some in the media, Oyelowo's performance was critically acclaimed and later won the 2001 Ian Charleson Award for best performance by an actor under 30 in a classical play.

In 2005, he appeared in a production of Prometheus Bound, which was revived in New York City in 2007. In 2006, he made his directorial debut on a production of The White Devil, produced by Inservice, his theatre company in Brighton which is co-run with fellow Brighton-based actors Priyanga Burford, Israel Aduramo, Penelope Cobbuld, and his wife, Jessica. He played the title role in Othello in 2016 at the New York Theatre Workshop with Daniel Craig as Iago, directed by Sam Gold. In 2024, he starred in the Royal National Theatre production of Coriolanus.

=== Television ===
Oyelowo is best known for playing MI5 officer Danny Hunter in the British drama series Spooks (known in North America as MI-5) from 2002 to 2004. He had before that appeared in Tomorrow La Scala (2002), Maisie Raine (1998) and Brothers and Sisters (1998). Soon after the end of his time on Spooks Oyelowo also appeared in the two Christmas specials of As Time Goes By (2005). In 2006, he appeared in the television film Born Equal alongside Nikki Amuka-Bird as a couple fleeing persecution in Nigeria – they also both appeared in Shoot the Messenger (2006) and in The No. 1 Ladies' Detective Agency (2008) as a husband and wife. Other cameos have included Mayo (guest-starring on 30 April 2006) and the television film Sweet Nothing in My Ear (2008, as defence attorney Leonard Grisham), while he has played recurring or main characters in Five Days (2007) and The Passion (2008, as Joseph of Arimathea).

In December 2009, he played the leading role of Gilbert in the BBC TV adaptation of Andrea Levy's novel Small Island. In March 2010, he played the role of Keme Tobodo in the BBC's drama series Blood and Oil. He starred in the HBO original film Nightingale (2014).

He stars in and co-produces the 2023 American western series Lawmen: Bass Reeves, based on the life of former slave Bass Reeves who, after the American Civil War, became one of the first Black deputy US Marshals, and the first west of the Mississippi River.

=== Voice acting ===
He appeared as Olaudah Equiano in Grace Unshackled – The Olaudah Equiano Story, a radio play adapting Equiano's autobiography, The Interesting Narrative of the Life of Olaudah Equiano. This was first broadcast on BBC 7 on 8 April 2007, with his wife Jessica Oyelowo as Mrs. Equiano.

In 2007, Oyelowo was the reader for John le Carré's The Mission Song. AudioFile magazine stated: "Think of David Oyelowo as a single musician playing all the instruments in a symphony. That is essentially what he manages in this inspired performance of John le Carré's suspense novel.... Can it really have been only one man in the narrator's recording booth? This virtuoso performance makes that seem impossible." In 2015, he was selected to portray James Bond in an audiobook version of Trigger Mortis, written by Anthony Horowitz.

As of 2014, he provides the voice of Imperial Security Bureau agent Alexsandr Kallus on the animated series Star Wars Rebels. As of 2017, Oyelowo voices the spirit of Scar, the main antagonist in season 2 of The Lion Guard. Oyelowo voiced the Tiger in a television adaptation of The Tiger Who Came to Tea which aired on Channel 4 for Christmas 2019.

=== Film ===
In 2012, Oyelowo appeared in Middle of Nowhere. Writer-director Ava DuVernay had been a fan of his work and had considered asking him to take the role, however before she could, Oyelowo received the script coincidentally from a friend of a friend of DuVernay's who happened to be sitting next to him on the plane and was considering investing in the project. The film premiered at the 2012 Sundance Film Festival to critical raves. That same year Oyelowo appeared in Lee Daniels' The Paperboy, which competed for the Palme d'Or at the 2012 Cannes Film Festival. Oyelowo reunited with Daniels the following year in The Butler.

In 2014, Oyelowo formed his own independent production company, Yoruba Saxon Productions which has co-produced movies that featured him including, Nightingale, Captive, Five Nights in Maine and A United Kingdom.

He worked with DuVernay again for Selma (2014), playing civil rights activist Martin Luther King Jr. The film, based on the 1965 Selma to Montgomery voting rights marches, had originally been set to be directed by Lee Daniels, but the project was dropped by Daniels so he could focus on The Butler.

He was slated to star with Lupita Nyong'o in a film adaptation of the Chimamanda Ngozi Adichie novel Americanah but scheduling conflicts meant the project never moved forward.

In February 2019, it was announced that Oyelowo had joined the Peter Rabbit cast with James Corden, Rose Byrne and Domhnall Gleeson reprising their roles as the title character, Bea and Thomas McGregor for its sequel released in March 2021.

In 2020, Oyelowo starred alongside George Clooney in the Netflix film The Midnight Sky. More recently, his Yoruba Saxon company signed a first look deal with Disney. The first film to come out of the deal will be The Return of the Rocketeer, a Disney+-exclusive sequel to the 1991 film The Rocketeer, which Oyelowo will produce alongside his wife, Jessica, and Brigham Taylor. Oyelowo is also being considered to star in the film, which will center on "a retired Tuskegee airman who takes up the Rocketeer mantle".

== Awards and honours ==
For his portrayal of Martin Luther King Jr. in Selma, Oyelowo received the NAACP Image Award for Outstanding Actor in a Motion Picture. He received his first Golden Globe Award nomination for Best Actor in a Motion Picture – Drama, while also receiving a nomination for Critics' Choice Movie Award for Best Actor.

Also in 2014, for his performance in Nightingale, he won the Critics' Choice Television Award for Best Actor in a Movie/Miniseries and was nominated for the Primetime Emmy Award for Outstanding Lead Actor in a Limited Series or Movie, Golden Globe Award for Best Actor – Miniseries or Television Film, NAACP Image Award for Outstanding Actor in a Television Movie, Mini-Series or Dramatic Special and a Satellite Award for Best Actor – Miniseries or Television Film.

Oyelowo was appointed Officer of the Order of the British Empire (OBE) in the 2016 New Year Honours for services to drama.

In 2024, Oyewolo was nominated for the Golden Globe Award for Best Actor – Miniseries or Television Film for his performance in Lawmen: Bass Reeves as Bass Reeves.

== Personal life ==
He is married to actress Jessica Oyelowo (née Watson), whom he met at LAMDA and with whom he has four children. They lived in Brighton before moving to Los Angeles, California. Oyelowo is a pescetarian.

A devout Christian, Oyelowo has stated that he believes God called him to play Rev. Martin Luther King Jr. Reflecting on his portrayal of King in the film Selma, Oyelowo has asserted: "I always knew that in order to play Dr. King, I had to have God flow through me because when you see Dr. King giving those speeches, you see that he is moving in his anointing."

A dual citizen, Oyelowo and his wife became naturalised US citizens on 20 July 2016. On doing so, he stated: "I did a film called Selma... and that film centres on voting rights and I've lived here for nearly 10 years now and to be walking around and doing a film about voting rights and telling people to vote, and you can't vote yourself is a little hypocritical. I decided it's time to do it and no time better than now."

He expressed solidarity with Palestine during the Gaza war. Oyelowo, as part of a group called Artists4Ceasefire, signed a letter urging then-US President Joe Biden to call for an immediate ceasefire in Gaza in October 2023.

== Performances and works ==
=== Film ===
Film
Year	Title	Role	Notes
2001	Dog Eat Dog	CJ	
2005	A Sound of Thunder	Payne	
2005	The Best Man	Graham	
2005	Derailed	Patrol Officer	
2006	As You Like It	Orlando De Boys	
2006	The Last King of Scotland	Dr. Junju	
2006	American Blend	Mercury	
2008	Who Do You Love?	Muddy Waters	
2009	Rage	Homer	
2011	Rise of the Planet of the Apes	Steven Jacobs	
2011	The Help	Preacher Green	
2011	96 Minutes	Duane	
2012	Red Tails	1st Lt. Joe "Lightning" Little	
2012	The Paperboy	Yardley Acheman	
2012	Middle of Nowhere	Brian	Nominated – NAACP Image Award for Outstanding Supporting Actor in a Motion Picture; Nominated – Black Reel Award for Best Supporting Actor; Nominated – Independent Spirit Award for Best Supporting Male
2012	Lincoln	Ira Clark	
2012	Jack Reacher	Emerson	
2013	The Butler	Louis Gaines	NAACP Image Award for Outstanding Supporting Actor in a Motion Picture; Nominated – Black Reel Award for Best Supporting Actor; Nominated – Screen Actors Guild Award for Outstanding Performance by a Cast in a Motion Picture
2014	Nightingale	Peter Snowden	Critics' Choice Television Award for Best Actor in a Movie/Miniseries; Black Reel Awards for Outstanding Actor, TV Movie or Limited Series; Nominated – Golden Globe Award for Best Actor – Miniseries or Television Film; Nominated – Primetime Emmy Award for Outstanding Lead Actor in a Miniseries or Movie; Nominated – NAACP Image Award for Outstanding Actor in a Television Movie, Mini-Series, or Dramatic Special; Nominated – Satellite Award for Best Actor – Miniseries or Television Film
2014	Interstellar	School Principal	
2014	Default	Atlas	
2014	Selma	Martin Luther King Jr.	Black Reel Award for Best Actor; African-American Film Critics Association Award for Best Actor; Kermode Award for Best Actor; NAACP Image Award for Outstanding Actor in a Motion Picture; Palm Springs International Film Festival Breakthrough Performance Award; Nominated – Awards Circuit Community Award for Best Actor; Nominated – Chicago Film Critics Association Award for Best Actor; Nominated – Critics' Choice Movie Award for Best Actor; Nominated – Golden Globe Award for Best Actor – Motion Picture Drama; Nominated – Independent Spirit Award for Best Male Lead; Nominated – Satellite Award for Best Actor – Motion Picture; Nominated – Village Voice Film Poll Award for Best Actor; Nominated – Washington D.C. Area Film Critics Association Award for Best Actor
2014	A Most Violent Year	Lawrence	Nominated – Black Reel Award for Best Supporting Actor
2015	Captive	Brian Nichols	
2015	Five Nights in Maine	Sherwin	
2016	Nina	Clifton Henderson	
2016	Queen of Katwe	Robert Katende	Nominated—Evening Standard British Film Awards for Best Actor; Nominated—London Film Critics' Circle Award for Best Actor; Nominated—NAACP Image Awards for Outstanding Supporting Actor
2016	A United Kingdom	Seretse Khama	
2018	The Cloverfield Paradox	Kiel	
2018	A Wrinkle in Time	The It	Cameo
2018	Gringo	Harold Soyinka	
2019	Don't Let Go	Detective Jack Radcliff	
2020	Come Away	Jack Littleton	
2020	The Water Man	Amos Boone	Directorial debut
2020	The Midnight Sky	Commander Tom Adewole	
2021	Chaos Walking	Aaron	
2021	Peter Rabbit 2: The Runaway	Nigel Basil-Jones	
2022	See How They Run	Mervyn Cocker-Norris	
2023	The Book of Clarence	John the Baptist	
2023	The After	Dayo	Nominated for Best Live Action Short Film at the 2024 Academy Awards.
2024	Role Play	Dave	
2024	The Strange Case	Louis	Podcast Series
2026	Newborn	Chris Newborn	
2026	Clarissa	Peter	

=== Television ===
Television
Year	Title	Role	Notes
1998	Maisie Raine	Sonny McDonald	Episode: "Food of Love"
1998	Brothers and Sisters	Lester Peters	
2002–2004	Spooks	Danny Hunter	
2005	As Time Goes By	Patrick	2 episodes
2006	Shoot the Messenger	Joseph Pascale	TV movie
2006	The Gil Mayo Mysteries	Eddie Barton, "Sexy" M.P.	Episode: "Episode #1.8"
2007	Five Days	Matt Wellings	Miniseries; 4 episodes
2008	A Raisin in the Sun	Joseph Asagai	TV movie
2008	The Passion	Joseph of Arimathea	TV miniseries (1 episode)
2008	The No. 1 Ladies' Detective Agency	Kremlin Busang	Episode: "The No. 1 Ladies' Detective Agency"
2009	Small Island	Gilbert	TV movie
2010	Blood and Oil	Keme Tobodo	TV movie
2011	The Good Wife	Judge Edward Weldon	Episode: "Two Courts"
2010–2011	Glenn Martin, DDS	Teacher / Clarence	Voice; 2 episodes
2013	Complicit	Edward Ekubo	TV movie
2014–2018	Star Wars Rebels	Alexsandr Kallus	Voice; 28 episodes
2014	Robot Chicken	Gandalf / The Doctor	Voice; Episode: "Walking Dead Lobster"
2017	The Lion Guard: The Rise of Scar	Scar	Voice; TV movie
2017–2019	The Lion Guard	Scar	Voice; 17 episodes
2018	The Joel McHale Show with Joel McHale	Himself	Episode: "Pizza Ghost"
2018–2019	Les Misérables	Javert	6 episodes
2020	Home Movie: The Princess Bride	Humperdinck	Episode: "Chapter Six: The Fire Swamp"
2020	5150		Television short; executive producer
2021	The Girl Before	Edward	Main role
2023	Silo	Holston Becker	Main role
2023	Lawmen: Bass Reeves	Bass Reeves	Main role Nominated—Critics' Choice Television Award for Best Actor in a Movie/Miniseries; Nominated—Golden Globe Award for Best Actor – Miniseries or Television Film; Nominated—Screen Actors Guild Award for Outstanding Performance by a Male Actor in a Miniseries or Television Movie
2025	Nature	Narrator	Episode: "Big Cats: Small World", Two-part miniseries
2025	Government Cheese	Hampton Chambers	Main role; also executive producer

=== Theatre ===
Year	Title	Role	Theater	Ref.
1999	The Suppliants	King Palasgus	Gate Theatre	
1999	Antony and Cleopatra	Dercetus	Royal Shakespeare Company	
1999	Volpone	Bonario	Royal Shakespeare Company	
1999	Oroonoko	Aboan	Royal Shakespeare Company	
2001	Richard III	Ghost of Henry VI	Royal Shakespeare Company	
2001	Henry VI: Parts 1, 2 & 3	Henry VI	Royal Shakespeare Company	
2003	The God Botherers	Monday	Bush Theatre	
2007	Prometheus Bound	Prometheus	Classic Stage Company	
2016	Othello	Othello	New York Theater Workshop	
2024	Coriolanus	Coriolanus	Royal National Theatre	

== See also ==
- Black British elite, Oyelowo's class in Britain
