= Shanty Town (TV series) =

- Written by: Xavier Ighorodje
- Directed by: Dimeji Ajibola
- Starring: Chidi Mokeme; Ini Edo; Nse Ikpe-Etim; Richard Mofe-Damijo; Nancy Isime; Sola Sobowale
- Country of origin: Nigeria

Production
- Executive producer: Chinenye Nworah Ini Edo Charles Okonkwo
- Producer: Chineye Chichi Nworah
- Cinematography: Jonathan Kovel
- Editor: Holmes Awa Dimeji Ajibola

Original release
- Network: Netflix
- Release: 20 January 2023

Shanty Town is a Nigerian crime thriller television series created by Xavier Ighorodje and Chichi Nworah and produced by Chinenye Nworah, the six-part series was released to Netflix on 20 January 2023. The series stars Chidi Mokeme, Ini Edo, Richard Mofe-Damijo, Nse Ikpe-Etim, Sola Sobowale, Nancy Isime, Shaffy Bello, Ali Nuhu and a host of others.

== Synopsis ==
Shanty Town follows the story of a ruthless leader named Scar who handles a lot of dirty business and is popularly regarded as the King of Shanty Town. Some of the Lagos hustlers who Scar and his associates have held captive has now decided to unite and wage war against him after it was discovered that captives that Scar supposedly sets free are always missing from existence.

Shanty Town is a town for drug dealers, prostitutes, and thugs. A town where crime has its throne. Inem's life is briefly glossed over and replaced by the good things said about her by characters such as Jackie and Mama T despite the fact that she's the core of the series as intended by the prologue.

== Cast ==
- Chidi Mokeme as Scar
- Ini Edo as Inem and Idong
- Richard Mofe-Damijo as Chief Fernandez
- Sola Sobowale as Mummy Tornado
- Nse Ikpe-Etim as Ene
- Zubby Michael as Colorado
- Nancy Isime as Shalewa
- Shaffy Bello as Dame Dabola
- Mercy Eke as Jackie
- Ali Nuhu as Accountant
- Uche Jombo as Detective Janice

== Episodes ==
No.	Title	Directed by	Written by	Original release date
1	"Episode 1"	Dimeji Ajibola	Xavier Ighorodje	20 January 2023
Courtesan Jackie has now earned enough to make her gain her freedom from Shanty Town, a town led by Scar, a drug kingpin and pimp. Meanwhile, Ene picks up a former associate from prison.
2	"Episode 2"	Dimeji Ajibola	Xavier Ighorodje	20 January 2023
Inem a former associate and member of the Shanty Town regains freedom from prison and returns to Shanty Town as Jackie is about to make her getaway. As Jackie makes her getaway from Shanty Town, Scar double crosses and kills her.
3	"Episode 3"	Dimeji Ajibola	Xavier Ighorodje	20 January 2023
Scar finds himself caught up between two powerful political entities, Chief Fernandez and Dame. At this point, Fernandez and Dame need Scar to do something for both of them to aid their political aims.
4	"Episode 4"	Dimeji Ajibola	Xavier Ighorodje	20 January 2023
Inem goes to work at the club, unfortunately for her, she catches the eyes of a dangerous guest, Chief Fernandez, who molested her. Scar asks Shalewa to get close to Chief Fernandez's son, Femi Fernandez, to help her clear her debt and gain freedom from Shanty Town.
5	"Episode 5"	Dimeji Ajibola	Xavier Ighorodje	20 January 2023
Shalewa begins to make progress on the mission Scar gives to her as Femi asks her on a date, however it becomes clear that Inem isn't actually Inem as she's Inem's twin sister who was sent as an undercover agent to trace Shanty Town's missing women.
6	"Episode 6"	Dimeji Ajibola	Xavier Ighorodje	20 January 2023
Inem's twin who's been acting as Inem confronts Ene about Jackie's disappearance and the ladies hence sort to go after Scar and gain freedom from Shanty Town.

== Awards and nominations ==
Year	Award	Category	Recipient	Result	Ref
2023	Africa Magic Viewers' Choice Awards	Best Actress In A Drama, Movie Or TV Series	Nse Ikpe-Etim	Nominated	
2023	Africa Magic Viewers' Choice Awards	Best Actress In A Drama, Movie Or TV Series	Ini Edo	Nominated	
2023	Africa Magic Viewers' Choice Awards	Best Actor In A Drama, Movie Or TV Series	Chidi Mokeme	Nominated	
2023	Africa Magic Viewers' Choice Awards	Best Art Director	Olalekan Isiaka	Nominated	
2023	Africa Magic Viewers' Choice Awards	Best Costume Designer	Bunmi Fashina, Tiannah Empire & Secrets of April	Nominated	
2023	Africa Magic Viewers' Choice Awards	Best Lighting Designer	Walter Odhiambo	Nominated	
2023	Africa Magic Viewers' Choice Awards	Best Sound Editor	Kolade Kayode Morakinyo	Nominated	
2023	Africa Magic Viewers' Choice Awards	Best Sound Track	Jaysynths & Hotkid	Nominated	
2023	Africa Magic Viewers' Choice Awards	Best Make Up	Maryam Ndukwe & Hakeem Effects Onilogbo	Won	
2023	Africa Magic Viewers' Choice Awards	Best Cinematographer	Jonathan Kovel	Nominated	
2023	Africa Magic Viewers' Choice Awards	Best Director	Dimeji Ajibola	Nominated	
