= Guillaume Niarfeix =

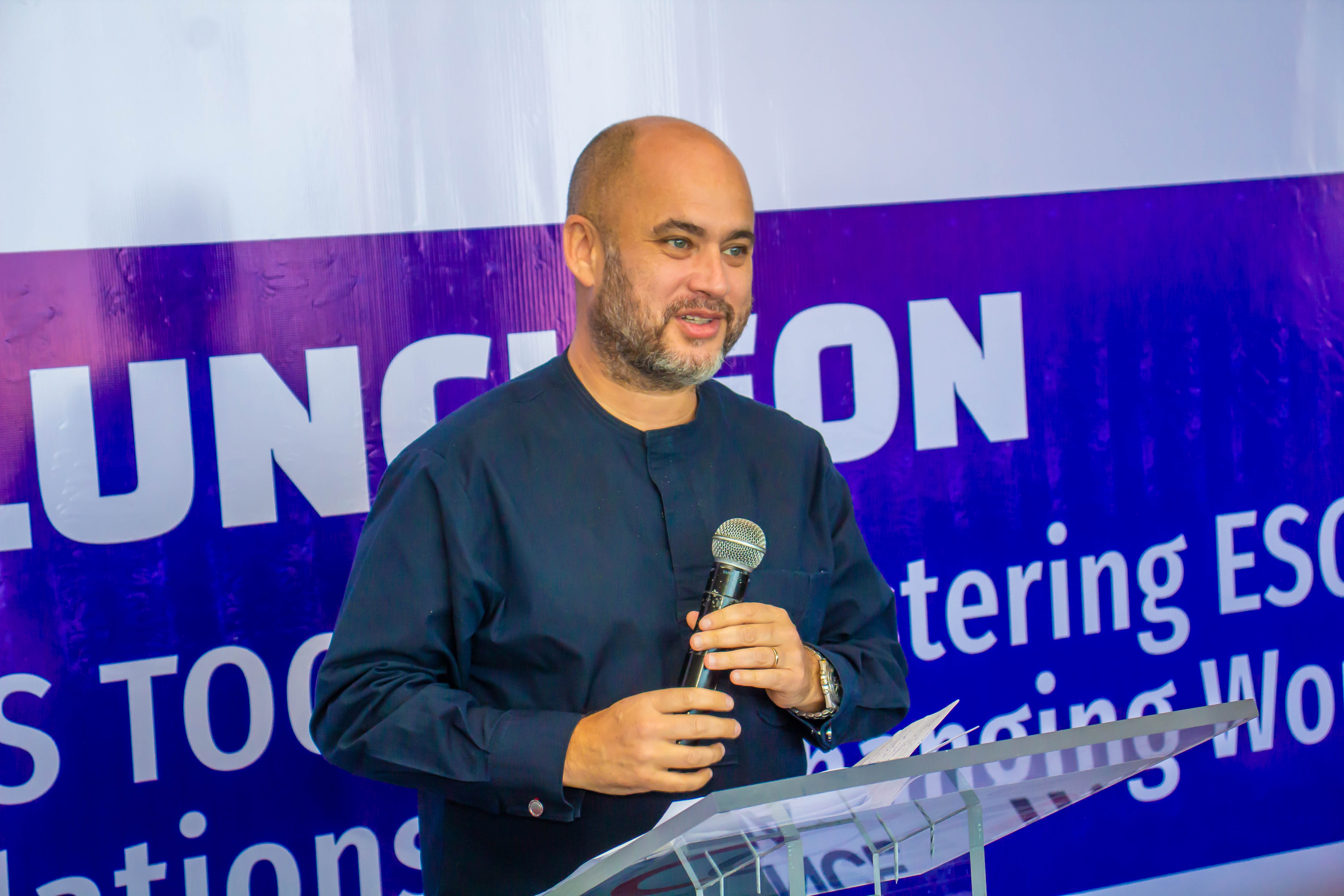

President of Franco-Nigeria Chamber of Commerce and Industry
- Incumbent
- Assumed office May 2024

Managing Director SPIE Global Services Energy, West Africa
- Incumbent
- Assumed office 2024

Personal details
- Born: September 9, 1979 (age 47)
- Education: École polytechnique, HEC Paris
- Occupation: Renewable energy expert
- Awards: Ordre national du Mérite

Guillaume Niarfeix (born 9 September 1979) is a French renewable energy expert serving as the Managing Director, SPIE Global Services Energy (Nigeria and Ghana) since July 2020, and (West Africa) since 2024. Niarfeix is the current President of the Franco-Nigeria Chamber of Commerce and Industry and a Board Member of Eurocham Nigeria. Niarfeix holds the French title of Chevalier de l'Ordre National du Mérite.

== Background and career ==
Guillaume Niarfeix was born on 9 September 1979 in France. He was educated at Ecole Polytechnique and HEC Paris. Niarfeix career in the energy industry span across several sectors including renewable energy, maintenance and training. He serves in multiple executive positions including as a board member of Magnifor Consulting, based in Amsterdam, Netherlands since 2015 and as Chairman of the Board at Lycée Français Louis Pasteur since 2019. A former executive at TotalEnergies and IBX Business Network, he was appointed Managing Director, SPIE Global Services Energy in charge of Nigeria and Ghana in July 2020 and became the head of the company’s West Africa region in 2024. In May 2024, he was inaugurated as 17th president of Franco-Nigerian Chamber of Commerce & Industry.

He has three beautiful children named : Jade , Enael et Isea

== Awards ==
Guillaume holds the French title of Ordre national du Mérite (Chevalier de l'Ordre National du Mérite) awarded him in 2024.
