= Lycée Français Louis Pasteur de Lagos =

French international school in Lagos, Nigeria

- Victoria Island, Lagos; Nigeria

Information
- School type: International School
- Established: 1958; 68 years ago
- Language: French
- Website: https://lflp-lagos.com/?lang=fr

The Lycée Français Louis Pasteur de Lagos (LFLP) is a French international school located in Victoria Island, Lagos, Nigeria. Established in 1958 by the Association Française du Nigeria (AFN), the school provides a comprehensive French curriculum from primary through secondary levels, preparing students for global academic and professional opportunities.

== History ==
Founded in 1958 under the auspices of the Association Française du Nigeria (AFN), the French School of Lagos initially operated from various locations in Ikoyi and Victoria Island. In 1987, the school moved to its current ultramodern purpose-built premises, constructed with support from the French Ministry of Foreign Affairs. The institution was officially renamed the "Lycée Français" in 1997, reflecting its expanded educational offerings and alignment with the French national curriculum.

The school is part of the Agency for French Education Abroad (AEFE), the largest global network of French schools. AEFE ensures the delivery of internationally recognized French diplomas and provides financial and administrative support to its member institutions.

== Educational approach ==
LFLP offers the French educational curriculum which enables students to make international applications. The French Baccalaureate is a highly regarded qualification that provides students with access to prestigious universities worldwide.

Graduates of Lycée Français Louis Pasteur (LFLP) in Lagos benefit from this rigorous curriculum, which fosters critical thinking, academic excellence, and multilingual proficiency. With dedicated guidance, students explore various higher education pathways, leading them to reputable institutions in France, Canada, the United States, the United Kingdom, and beyond.

The school emphasizes multilingual education, providing instruction in French, with English as a subject. German, Spanish and Arabic are also offered as optional languages to prepare students for global opportunities. Over 30 extracurricular activities, including dance, music, creative and martial arts, STEM, sports programs, etc., complement academic learning, fostering holistic development.

LFLP takes pride in its alumni who have successfully pursued further studies in diverse fields, demonstrating the strength of the French educational system.

== Facilities ==
The LFLP campus comprises three main buildings, two courtyards, and multiple sports areas. The primary school building houses classrooms, administrative offices, meeting rooms, a motricity room, a dormitory, a library (BCD). A dedicated hall, the "Salle des Droits de l’Homme," serves as a venue for performances, accommodating approximately 200 attendees.

The secondary school building houses science and technology laboratories, another library (CDI), art and music rooms and over 300 m² food court complete with a world class kitchen. The campus also features a swimming pool added in 2017, an indoor sports field suitable for basketball, handball, and volleyball, a dojo, a fitness room, as well as an outdoor racetrack and grass field for football.

In 2019, the president of the school Guillaume Niarfeix renovated the facilities and transitioned to a full solar energy system making it eco-friendly to comply with global climate reforms.

== Community and governance ==
Operated by the non-profit Association Française du Nigeria, LFLP involves parents in its governance through an elected management committee. This collaborative approach ensures that the school meets the needs of its diverse community, promoting a multicultural environment where students from various backgrounds thrive.

=== Governing board ===
The school’s governing board includes the following members with voting rights:

- The Director
- Deputy Headmaster
- Administrative and Financial Director
- Main Education Adviser
- Director of Primary Classes
- Representative of the French Embassy
- Student and Parent Representatives
- Staff Representatives (teaching and non-teaching)

== Presidents ==
Guillaume Niarfeix (2019–present)

== See also ==
- Institut français du Nigeria in Abuja
