= Ajah, Lagos =

Town in Lagos, Nigeria

Coordinates: 06°28′0″N 03°34′0″E

Ajah
- Town
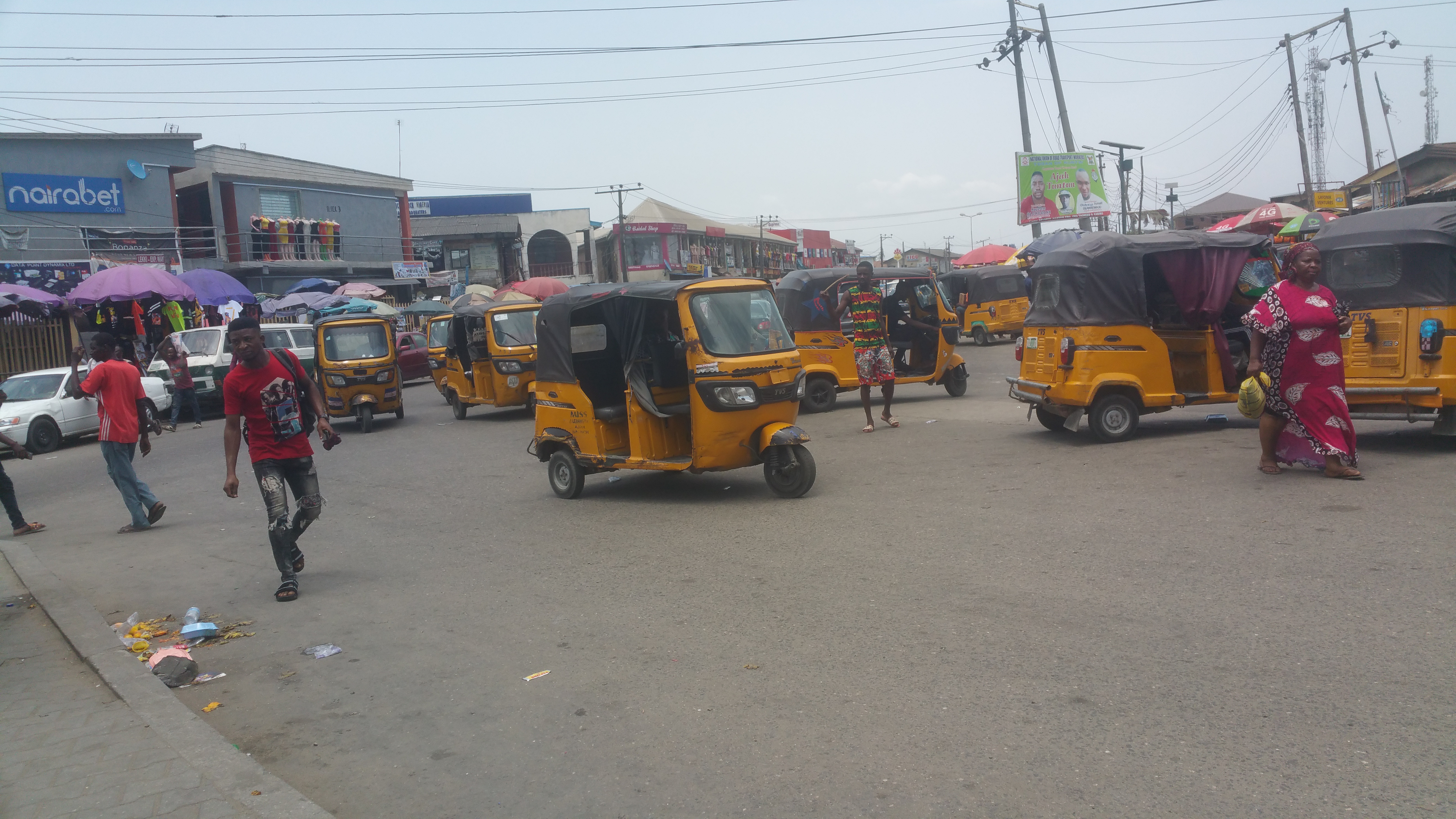

- Location within Nigeria
- Country: Nigeria
- State: Lagos State
- LGA(s): Eti-Osa
- Time zone: UTC+1 (WAT)
- ZIP: 101245

Ajah is a town in Eti-Osa local government area in Lagos State, Nigeria. It is located on the Lekki Peninsula approximately 22 kilometres (14 mi) southeast of Lagos.

== History ==
Ajah was founded by the Ojupon, Ogunsemo and Odugbese Abereoje families, who accommodated other families in the 16th century. The trio were the first settlers, and their major occupation was fishing. Among themselves, they appointed the Baale, who would to see to the affairs of the community while they were away fishing in the river. The Baale was from Ogunsemo. Ajah land is divided among 42 chiefs and 10 kingmakers. The 11th Baale of Ajah, Chief Murisiku Alani Oseni Adedunloye Ojupon was installed on 1 October 2009.

Ajah is occupied by Ajah and Ilaje people who migrated to Ajah after being displaced from Maroko and Moba. The Ajah and Ìlàje peoples have long been embroiled in intercommunal conflicts. Ajah is also surrounded by a border of water which links the Lagos Lagoon to the Atlantic Ocean.

== Climate ==
Ajah experiences a tropical savanna climate (Aw) according to the Köppen climate classification.

=== Flooding ===
Ajah is a flood-prone area in Lagos, with heavy rains often causing destruction, as well as infrequent deaths due to residents being swept away by floodwaters. Part of this has been attributed to urban planning violations and a lack of drainage.

== Violence ==
A number of violent occurrences have been noted in Ajah. These include a fatal police shooting in 2022, an armed robbery of a money-carrying van which left one dead and intercommunal conflict between the Ajah and Ìlàje peoples, with multiple occurrences of arson, gun violence and rape.

Violence between cults is also prevalent in Ajah. Incidences include a number of beheadings, as well as widespread arrests due to these clashes.

== Notable institutions ==
- Lagos Business School
- Pan-Atlantic University
- Lagos State Model College Badore
- Victoria Garden City

== Gallery ==
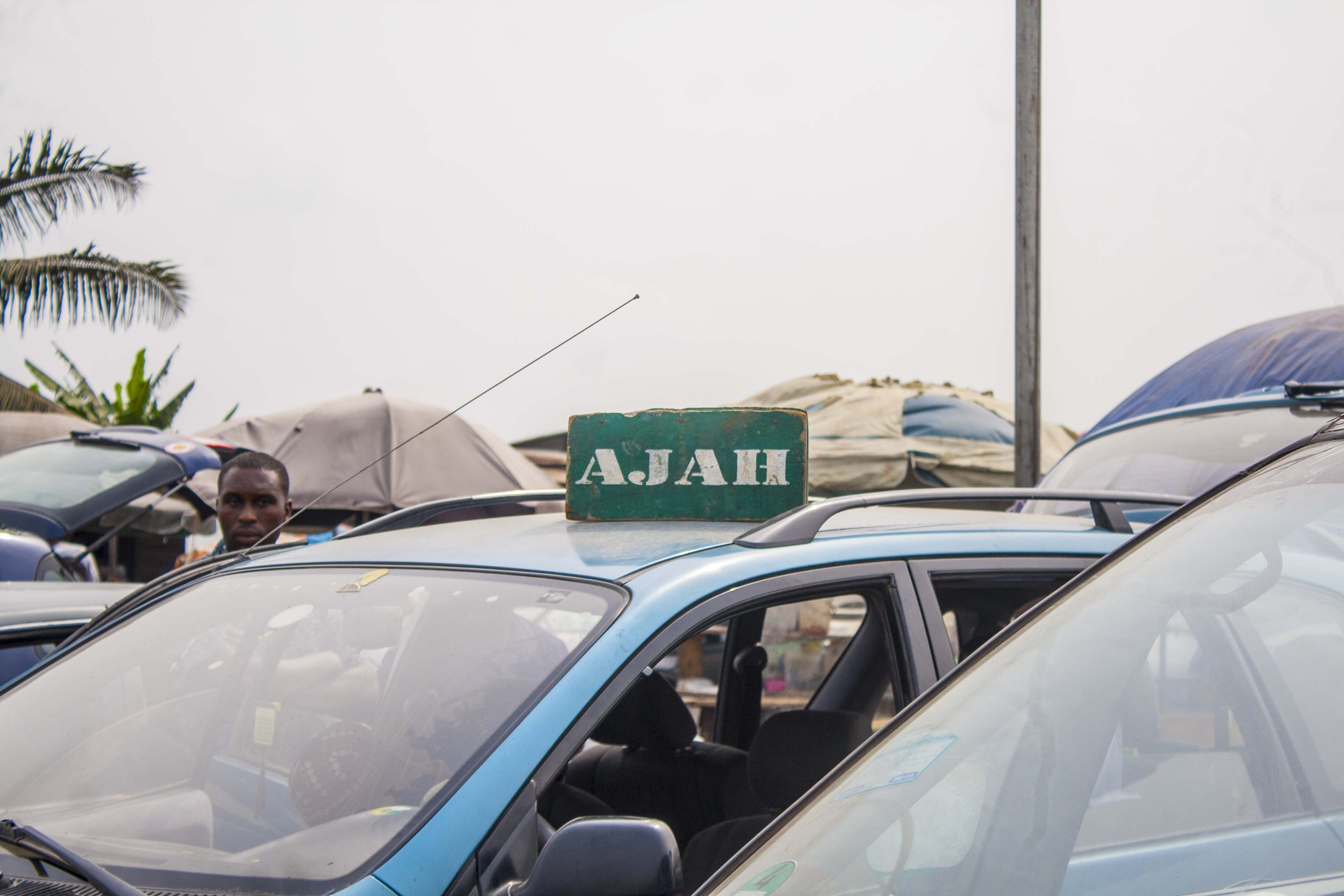
Ajah sign at a motor-park

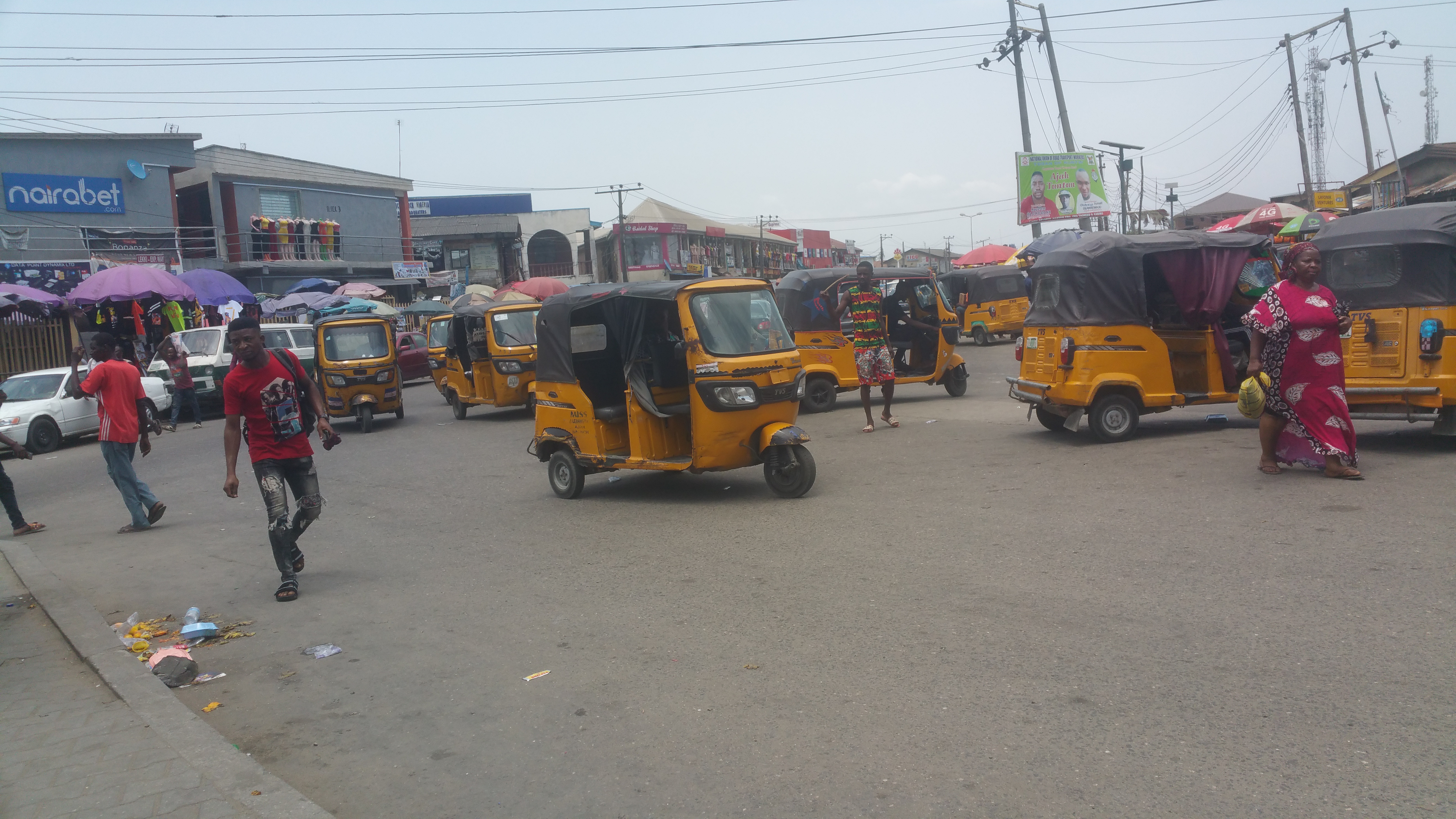
Commercial tricycles (keke NAPEP) in Ajah

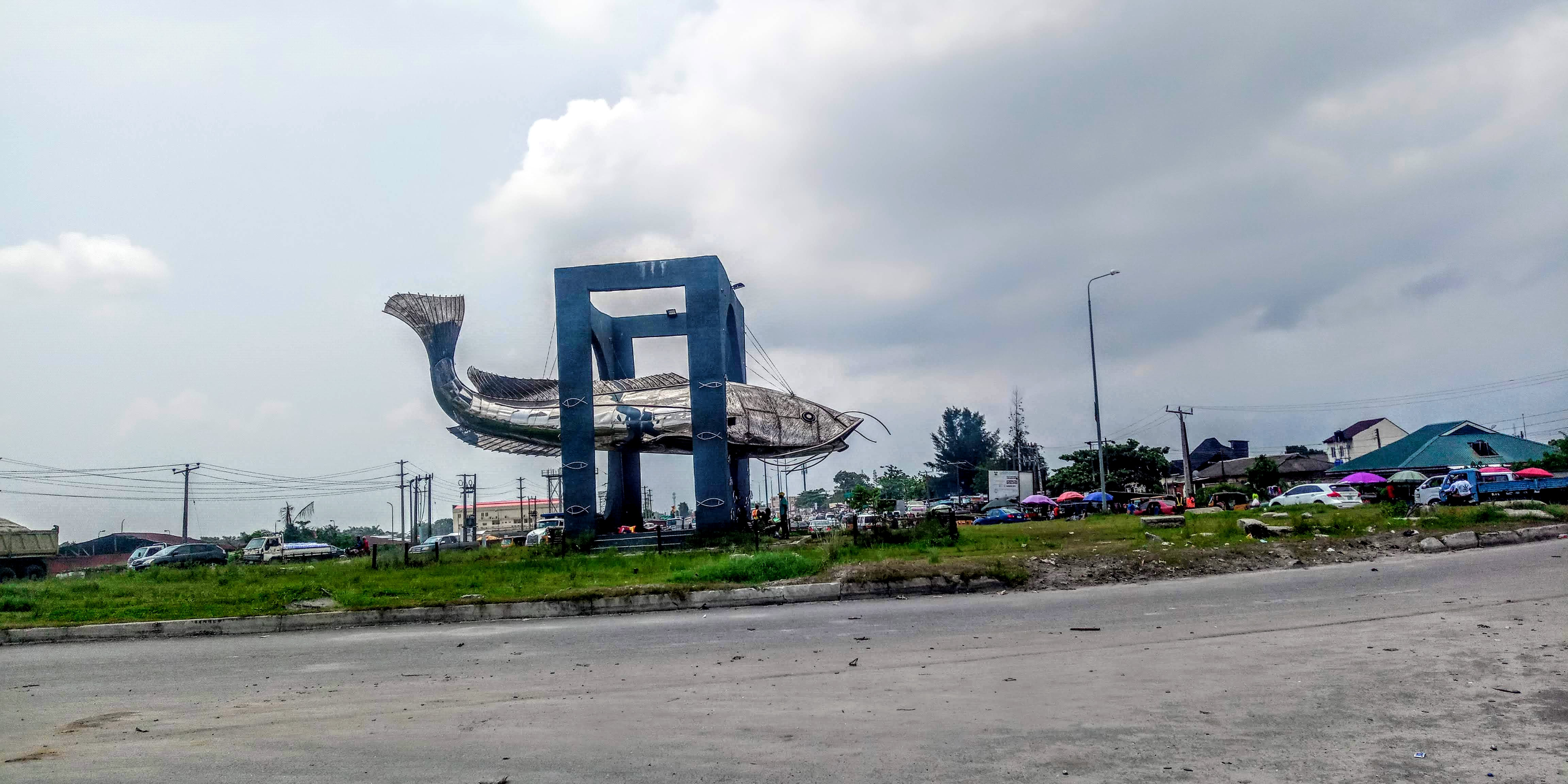
Abraham Adesanya roundabout

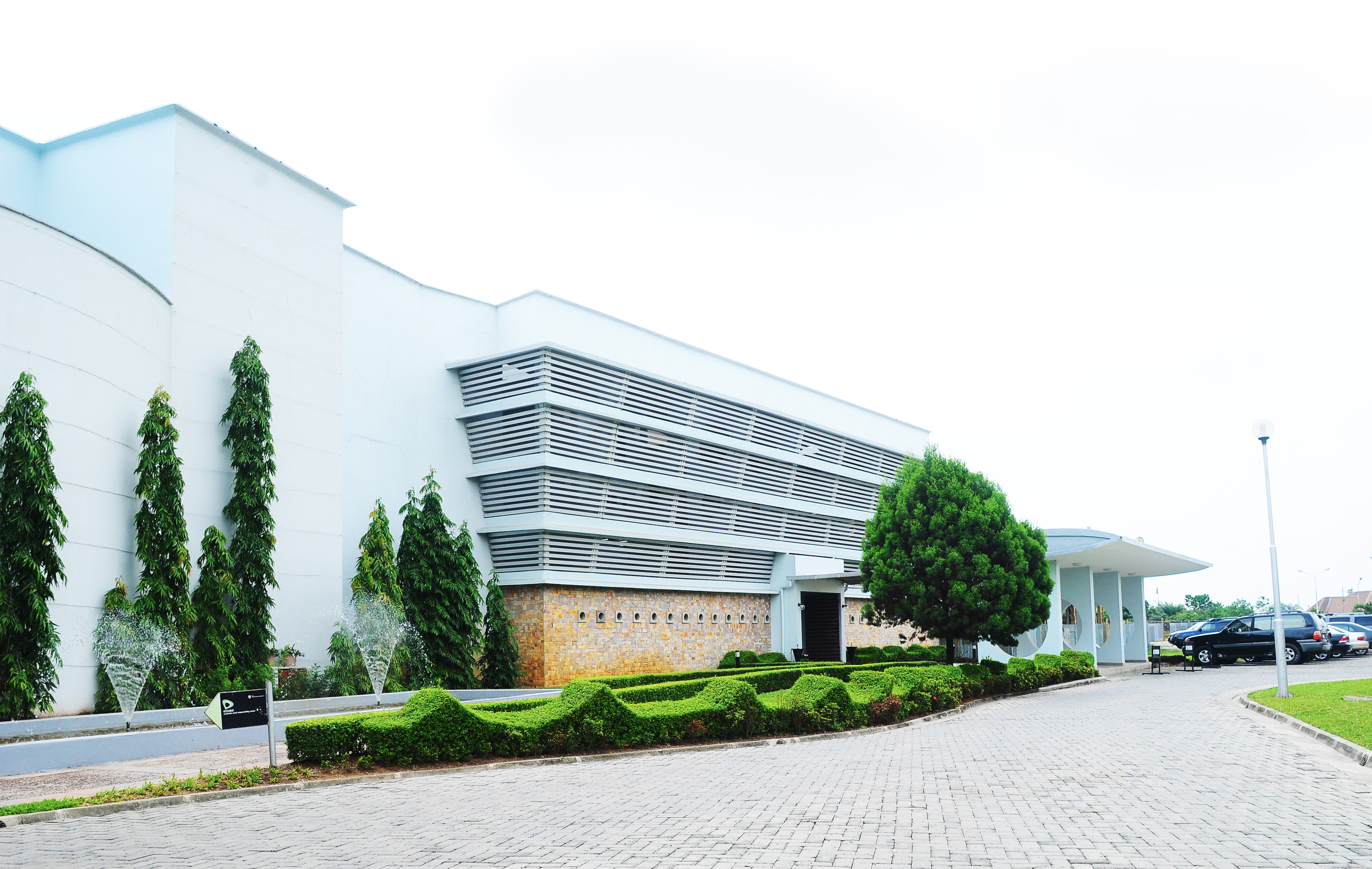
Lagos Business School
