= Genevieve Magazine =

Nigerian fashion and lifestyle magazine

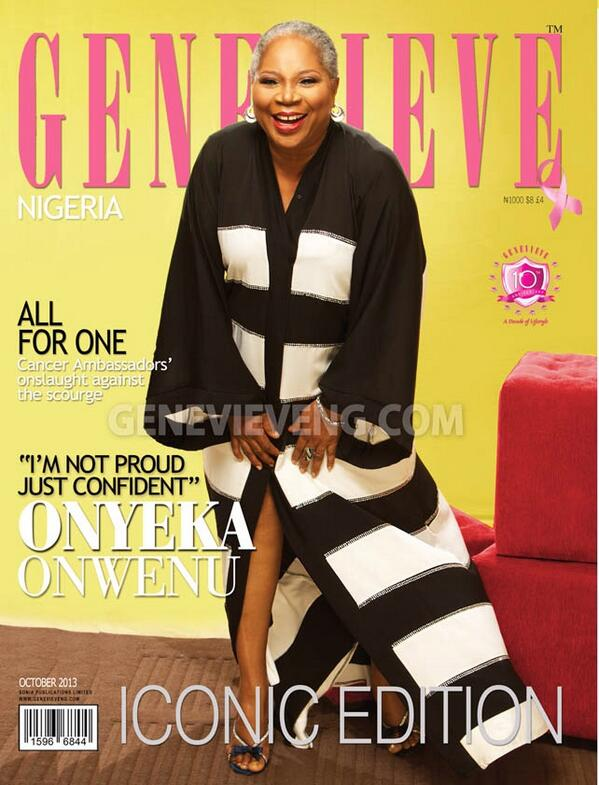
- Onyeka Onwenu on the cover of Genevieve magazine October issue 2013
- Editor: Betty Irabor
- Categories: Lifestyle
- Frequency: Monthly
- Publisher: Sonia Publications Ltd.
- Founder: Betty Irabor
- Founded: May 2003; 23 years ago
- Country: Nigeria
- Based in: Plot 8, Block 103, Olabanji Olajide Street, Off Rahman Adeboyejo Street, Lekki Phase 1, Lekki, Lagos, Nigeria
- Language: English
- Website: web.archive.org/web/20140427085823/http://www.genevieveng.com/
- ISSN: 1596-6844

Genevieve Magazine is a Nigerian lifestyle publication founded by Betty Irabor in 2003. It has a circulation of 15–50,000 copies across Africa. Additionally, the magazine hosts the Genevieve Pink Ball, dedicated to breast cancer awareness and fundraising, and the Genevieve Beauty Awards. Genevieve Magazine has featured esteemed personalities such as Yvonne Nelson, Tems, Genevieve Nnaji, and Rita Dominic.

== History ==
In 2003, Betty Irabor, a journalist and entrepreneur, founded Genevieve Magazine at the age of 45, recognizing a void within the Nigerian publishing industry. Betty's motivation to own a magazine was sparked while browsing through a lifestyle publication from Singapore. Her vision was to establish a lifestyle publication for women, particularly African women. It is the most widely read magazine in Nigeria with a readership of 7 out of 10. In 2005 Genevieve Magazine launched the Genevieve Foundation, the foundation holds an annual Pink Ball fundraiser dedicated to supporting breast cancer victims. As a breast cancer survivor, founder Betty Irabor is actively involved within the foundation, aiming to increase awareness and provide crucial support for the cause. In 2013, Genevieve magazine celebrated its 10th anniversary, announcing a special edition featuring10 influential icons on the cover.
