= Lagos State Junior Model College Kankon =

Location
- Kankon; Badagry, Lagos State; Nigeria

Information
- Type: boarding
- Motto: Hardwork Setting the pace of excellence through God
- Established: 6 January 2003 (23 years ago)
- Founder: Lagos State Government
- Status: Open
- Principal: Mrs S.I Sanni
- Gender: Mixed
- Campus type: Urban
- Colour: Green
- Website: http://lsjmck.com/

Lagos State Junior Model College Kankon is a state owned secondary school located in Kankon area Badagry, Lagos State.

== History ==
Owing to the change in the organizational structure of secondary schools in Lagos State, Lagos State Junior Model College was carved out from Lagos State Model College Kankon in 2003.

== Facilities ==
Along with other model colleges in the state, Lagos State Junior Model College, Kankon operates an all boarding schooling system.

== Former principals ==
- Mrs S.I Sanni, January 2003 to 13 November 2005
- Mrs Adeyemi, 21 November 2005 to 21 February 2007
- Mr J.M Ashaka, 21 February to 1 March 2011
- Mr Ajose, 2011 to 19 July 2013
- Mr J.M Ashaka, 2013 to 1 July 2014
- Mrs. S.M Ayo, 2014 to present
