= KEY Academy =

Educational institution in Nigeria

Coordinates: 6°26′29″N 3°26′38″E

KEY (Keep Educating Yourself) Academy is a Nigerian primary and secondary academic institution based in Lagos, Nigeria. Founded in 2019, it focuses on project-based learning (PBL) to equip students with 21st-century skills. In 2025, KEY Academy was named as a Top 10 finalist for the World's Best School Prize for Innovation.

== History ==
KEY Academy was founded in Lagos, Nigeria, in 2019 by Damilola Okonkwo, a finance professional who had formerly worked at Credit Suisse and JP Morgan in London. She established the school as an alternative to the commonly used approach of rote learning and memorisation in Nigeria, for children aged 18 months to 18 years old.

Following the outbreak of the COVID-19 pandemic that forced school closures across Nigeria in 2020, KEY Academy introduced a remote learning program named “KEY @ Home,” which trained parents on how to facilitate project-based learning at home. The program resources included offline projects, guidance materials, and daily short video calls.

== Curriculum ==
KEY Academy's curriculum is underpinned by project-based learning, incorporating foundational skills, such as literacy and numeracy and 21st-century skills, such as critical thinking, collaboration, and problem-solving. The curriculum mirrors the Early Years Foundation Stage (EYFS) and the National Curriculum in England, as well as core tenets from the Nigerian education system.

Students engage in interdisciplinary projects aimed at solving real-world problems. The projects emphasize process and collaboration typically leading to public presentations or physical products. The curriculum emphasizes cultural education exploring Nigeria's rich and diverse heritage and African historical narratives. They use continuous and integrated assessment to evaluate student performance. The classrooms are multi-age and the teachers known as co-learners serve as mentors and facilitators with external experts contributing to the learning projects.
