= Atlantic Hall =

Secondary school in Epe, Nigeria

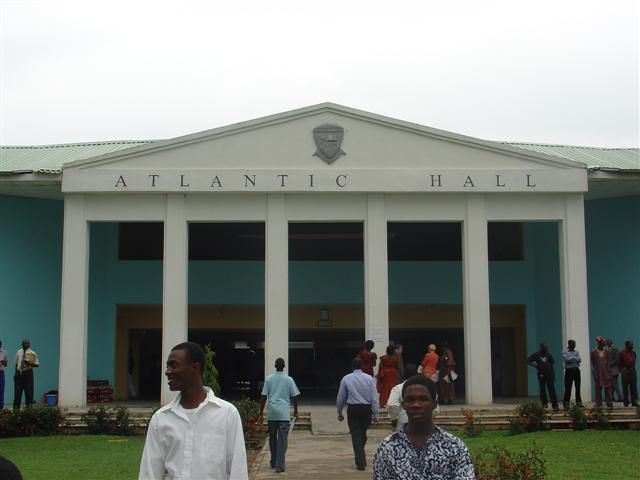

Information
- School type: Boarding school
- Established: 1989; 37 years ago
- Age: 9 to 18
- Enrollment: c.600
- Houses: Emerald; Garnet; Sapphire; Topaz
- Website: atlantic-hall.net

Atlantic Hall is a private coeducational secondary school in Epe, Lagos State, Nigeria which holds about 300 students and is located about 70 kilometres from Lagos. It opened in 1989 in the Maryland area, Ikeja, Lagos State, with dormitories close to Eko Hospital Ikeja, before relocating to Poka Epe in the mid-nineties. Its landmark include Pobuna Junior and Senior High School with close proximity to Araga in Epe.

== Principals ==
- 1989–1992: Gaynor Williams
- 1992–1993: A. Moses
- 1993–1998: F. Phillips
- 2001–2006: G. Hazell
- 2006–2007: P. Redler
- 2008–2010: M.E.Curnane
- 2010–2020: Andrew Jedras
- 2020–2022: Tunji Abimbola
- 2022–2023: Terry Howard

== Curriculum ==
=== Junior Secondary School ===
Students spend three years in the Junior School; all programmes include Physical Education and Computer Studies.

Evaluation and Certification are based on Continuous Assessment (Form Order System) and End-of-Course Examination conducted by the Ministry of Education leading to the award of the Cambridge Checkpoint Certificate. In Jss3, students go ahead to sit Cambridge Checkpoint.

=== Senior Secondary School ===
Students spend three years in the Senior Secondary School. The school combines the Nigerian Curriculum with the International General Certificate of Secondary Education (IGCSE) conducted by Cambridge International Examinations (CIE). Evaluation and certification are based on continuous assessment (Form Order System) and an end-of-course examination conducted by the West African Examinations Council (WAEC), leading to the award of the West African Senior School Certificate (WASSC). In the senior secondary school, students pick among the Science, Art and Business classes, depending on which career path they are interested in.

=== IGCSE ===
The International General Certificate of Secondary Education (IGCSE) programme was introduced into Atlantic Hall in September 2001 as a substitute for the Cambridge GCE 'O' Level. The IGCSE is conducted in June and November each year by Cambridge International Examinations (CIE) through the British Council. All Atlantic Hall SS2 students sit for the examination in November starting from 2012.

=== The Sciences ===
==== Science education ====
The school has well-equipped science laboratories for Physics, Chemistry, Biology and Computer Science.

==== The school farm ====
The school farm on the campus assists the teaching of Agricultural Science. It includes both a Goat house and a Pigsty. The farm grows various crops; some of the students help in planting as projects for the Environmental Club or as class practicals.

== Arts ==
The school provides tuition in art, music and drama.

Drama is taught as an extempore or scripted class lesson, or in a formal play. Drama productions are staged by Junior and Senior students every year.

=== Vocational education ===
Clothing and Textiles are offered as subjects in the Senior School. Students are taught about fabrics, designs and production of clothing, draperies, home decorations and fashion. Home Economics is taught in the Junior Secondary School (Foods and Nutrition in the Senior School) to introduce students to home management and basic cookery. Students can opt for this subject in the WASSCE and the IGCSE. Students are taught Technical Drawing in the Senior School. It is a practical course, and the students are taught about technical and architectural drawings.

== Sea School ==
SS2 students take the Sea School program in their first term. It helps in teaching and training students on how to survive in different conditions. It lasts for about 2 weeks, and when completed students receive certificates and badges. Due to security concerns, the Sea School program was suspended in 2018.

== Prefects ==
The prefects for the next school year are chosen when the students are in the 3rd term in SS2 after successfully completing their sea school program. The main prefects are the head girl and the head boy. There are other positions such as the dining hall prefects, sports prefects and Assembly Prefects among others. Some of the 2027 session prefects include:

Headboy: Trevor Udom HeadGirl: Zoe Ukah Deputy HeadBoy: Chukwuemeka Enendu Deputy HeadGirl: Erdoona Atim Assembly Prefect: Makanjuola Adebayo Assembly Prefect: Pela Akpobevughe Dining Hall prefect: Okoko Faith

== Sports ==
The students participate in sporting activities such as soccer, basketball and swimming. An annual interhouse sports competition is held yearly in January.

== Medical facilities ==
The school has a clinic with a doctor and nurses resident, in the school compound. It has both a reception and a waiting area. Also, they have both a male and a female ward for students or patients who need to stay overnight and be looked after.

== PTA ==
The school has a Parent Teacher Association open to teachers and parents. They host open day's for different year groups, where parents and their children can come in and have informative conversations with their various students.

=== Projects ===
The Atlantts; it has donated a fully equipped clinic and ambulance to the school. It is currently working on a fully equipped and well-furnished sports centre.

== Staff ==
The school staff consists of teachers, sports coordinators, cleaners, housemistresses, doctors, nurses, librarians and security guards. The number of academic and non-academic staff exceeds 150.

== Students ==
The school caters for students aged 9 to 18. It is a boarding school, where students reside in hostels with what are called house parents. Upon enrollment, students are put into one of four houses named after gems, namely Emerald, Garnet, Sapphire and Topaz. The students participate in some external competitions, such as the Cowbell NASSMAC (National Secondary School Mathematics Competition).

== Notable alumni ==
- Idia Aisien (born 1991), model, TV presenter, and actress
- Kemi Adetiba (born 1980), filmmaker, television director, and music video director
- Naeto C, musician
- Amaka Osakwe (born 1987),
- Damilola Ogunbiyi, sustainable energy advocate
- Seye Ogunlewe (athlete) (born 1991), sprinter
- Seni Sulyman (born 1995), entrepreneur

== See also ==
- List of schools in Lagos
