= Betty Irabor =

Nigerian columnist, philanthropist, writer and publisher

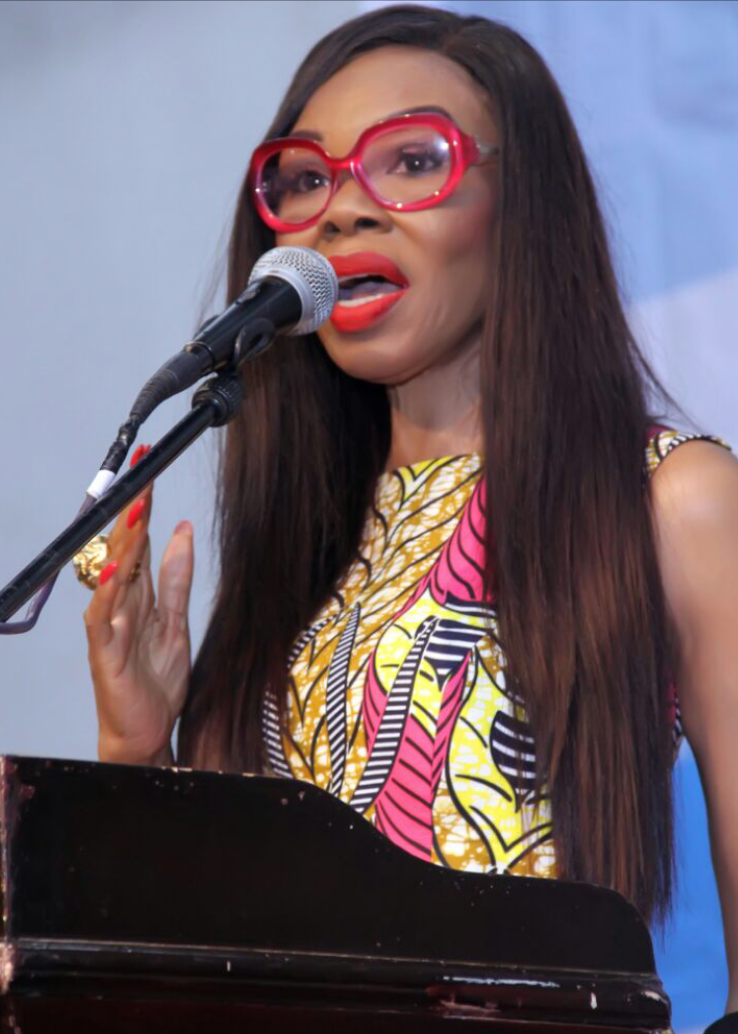
- Born: March 25, 1957 (age 69)
- Occupations: journalist, publisher
- Known for: founder, Genevieve Magazine
- Spouse: Soni Irabor
- Children: 2

Betty Irabor (born March 25, 1957) is a Nigerian columnist, philanthropist, writer, publisher and founder of Genevieve Magazine. She previously had a column in Black & Beauty magazine in the United Kingdom. She also has a foundation that promotes breast cancer awareness, early detection, and treatment.

== Career ==
In 2003, she founded Genevieve Magazine, which has been described as "Nigeria's leading inspirational and lifestyle magazine." It is headquartered in Lekki, with a staff of fourteen. Ten issues are published each year. The magazine website focuses on celebrity news. Irabor is the editor-in-chief and chief executive officer.

In 2018, her memoir Dust to Dew was published. In it, she chronicles her struggles with depression.

She is also a philanthropist, public speaker, and champion of breast cancer awareness with her nonprofit known as the Genevieve PinkBall Foundation.

== Personal life ==
Irabor was born on March 25, 1957, and raised in Nigeria. She's married to Soni Irabor and they have two children, including the actress Sonia Irabor. Their son made a short film that was selected by the Zanzibar International Film Festival.

== Award and honors ==
Irabor was honored by the Association of Professional Women Bankers as The Most Accomplished Female Publisher in Nigeria in 2011..
