= SunRise Academy =

Private school in Lagos, Nigeria

- Motto: "Building A future"
- Type: Private
- Established: 2005
- Location: Isolo, Lagos State, Nigeria
- Website: www.thesunriseacademy.com

SunRise Sixth Form College is a private owned school in Lagos Nigeria, a co-educational sixth form college in Isolo, Lagos, Nigeria for academically able students. It provides full-time Cambridge AS and A-level courses for approximately 100 students (mostly between the ages of 16 and 22) from the surrounding area and every part of the country.

SunRise Academy's reputation for academic success came in the year 2006 when 3 out of its 7 candidates had AAA. Ever since then students studying at the sixth form college have achieved the highest pass rate.

== History ==
SunRise Sixth Form College, was founded to assist Nigerian Students willing to further their education in Nigerian Universities or abroad. The college is affiliated to many foreign universities, colleges / sixth form colleges, is a co-educational A level college accepting up to 100 students each year. The college is situated in Lagos, Nigeria. Presently, there are over 100 students in various universities abroad who graduated from this school. The school was founded by Soneye Philip.

SunRise Sixth Form College is currently representing about 36 UK schools for IUFP.

The International University Foundation Programme (IUFP) is a one-year full-time pre-degree course, which offers students direct entry route to prestigious British Universities for degree courses in the United Kingdom. The programme is aimed at international students including those based in the United Kingdom and seeking direct admittance into leading British Universities after one year of study and without needing to undertake the two year GCE ’A’ Levels course. Students successfully completing the IUFP will progress to degree courses in leading British Universities that have either signed Progression Agreements with Middlesex College of Law or informally recognised the IUFP.
