= David Olumide Aderinokun =

Nigerian politician

Personal details
- Born: 18 August 1971 (age 55) Lagos, Lagos State, Nigeria
- Party: People's Democratic Party
- Education: Apata Memorial High School; University of East London; University of Abuja.

Chief David Olumide Aderinokun (born 18 August 1971) is a Nigerian businessman and politician. He is a member of the People's Democratic Party (PDP) Nigeria. Prior to his entrance into politics, he is a realtor who specialized in joint venture projects.

== Early life ==
Born on 18 August 1971 in Lagos, Chief David Olumide Aderinokun had his elementary school at Albalti Nursery and Primary School, Papa-Ajao, Lagos. He then proceeded to Mushin Boys High School Isolo, Lagos and finished his secondary school education at Apata Memorial High School, Isolo, Lagos where he obtained his Secondary School Certificate.

He travelled abroad for tertiary education and attended the University of East London where he obtained a B.S.C (Hons), in Business Studies. Upon his return from the United Kingdom, Aderinokun attended the University of Abuja for a second degree and he graduated with a Bachelor of Science degree (Bsc. Hons) in Public Administration in 2010.

In 2020, he was honoured with an Honorary Doctorate in Public Administration by the University of Nicosia as recognition for his achievements in business management and public administration.

== Political life ==
Chief Aderinokun entered politics in 2011 when he lost his bid to represent his Party at the Nigerian House of Representative on the platform of the People's Democratic Party (PDP). He tried again and won the Primaries to represent Abeokuta North Federal Constituency on 3 October 2018.

He was the People's Democratic Party (PDP) Senatorial candidate in Ogun Central Senatorial District for the 2023 general elections in Nigeria.

== Personal life ==
Chief David Olumide Aderinokun is married to media personality Stephanie Coker. They married on 12 August 2017, on the Greek Island of Mykonos. They have a daughter who was born in November 2019 and they announced the arrival of their second daughter in October 2025.

In June 2021, David Olumide Aderinokun was installed as a Chief of Owu Kingdom in Abeokuta. He is the Akinruyiwa of Owu Kingdom while his wife, Stephanie is the Yeye Akinruyiwa.
