= Chinenye Nworah =

Nigerian film producer

- Citizenship: Nigeria
- Occupation: Film producer

Chinenye Nworah also known as Chichi Nworah is a Nigerian media entrepreneur, film and producer. She is the founder of Giant Creative Media, a production company focused on premium African storytelling. She is also the co-founder of Premium BoxOffice TV (PBO TV), a youth-focused Nollywood channel broadcast across Africa via StarTimes.

Nworah is known as the showrunner and executive producer of the Netflix original series Shanty Town and the M-Net series Slum King, the latter of which won Best M-Net Original Series at the 2024 Africa Magic Viewers’ Choice Awards (AMVCA). She also served as showrunner on the romantic drama My Fairytale Wedding (2024), which won Best M-Net Original Series at the 2025 AMVCA.

In 2025, Nworah was elected as a member of the International Academy of Television Arts & Sciences, which hosts the International Emmy Awards, recognizing outstanding achievements in global television.

== Early life ==
Chinenye Nworah is the second child in a family of four. She was born in Onitsha, Anambra State, Nigeria. She is originally from Nsukka, Enugu State. She attended Federal Government Girls College Nsukka, Enugu State. Nworah attended Lagos State University where she studied Computer Science. She attended the New York Film Academy. She is currently pursuing her degree in United States.

== Career ==
Nworah began her professional journey in Nigeria’s media and technology sector, first working in e-commerce with YSG Hubs, where she developed experience in business operations and digital consumer engagement. She later transitioned into the entertainment industry as a Content Acquisition Executive at Ibaka TV, one of Nigeria’s early video-on-demand platforms, where she gained insight into audience trends, rights acquisition, and the evolving digital distribution landscape. Nworah founded Giant Creative Media, a production company focused on developing and producing high-end African stories for global audiences. Through Giant Creative Media, she has led the creation of multiple acclaimed titles that blend cultural authenticity with international production standards.

In 2023, she served as showrunner and executive producer of the Netflix original series Shanty Town, a crime drama that explored power, corruption, and survival in Lagos. The show became one of the most-streamed Nigerian series on Netflix upon release. That same year, she also helmed Slum King for M-Net and Africa Magic, which went on to win Best M-Net Original Series at the 2024 Africa Magic Viewers’ Choice Awards (AMVCA).

Nworah continued her collaboration with M-Net as showrunner of the romantic drama My Fairytale Wedding (2024), which received the Best M-Net Original Series award at the 2025 AMVCA. Beyond production, she co-founded Premium BoxOffice TV (PBO TV), a youth-focused Nollywood channel broadcast across Africa via StarTimes, curating original films and series for millions of viewers across the continent.

Her creative and entrepreneurial achievements have been recognized with multiple honors, including the Eko Star Film & TV Award, City People Entertainment Awards, and Netflix Women’s Month recognition (2024). In 2025, she was elected as a member of the International Academy of Television Arts & Sciences, which presents the International Emmy Awards, joining a global network of television leaders and storytellers.

== Influence and style ==
Nworah’s creative work is known for centering strong, complex female characters and exploring social issues within contemporary African society. Her productions often blend entertainment with commentary on power, corruption, justice, and survival, using human-driven storytelling to highlight the resilience of women in patriarchal and economically challenging environments.

Through series such as Shanty Town, Slum King, and My Fairytale Wedding, Nworah has been recognized for combining cinematic aesthetics with mainstream appeal, advancing Nollywood’s transition toward prestige television. Her narratives frequently balance grit and glamour, depicting both the struggles and aspirations of urban Africans.

Critics and industry commentators have noted her role in shaping a new wave of female-led African storytelling that positions women not just as victims or side characters, but as decision-makers and agents of change. By fusing commercial storytelling with socially conscious themes, Nworah has contributed to redefining how Nigerian and African television are perceived globally.

== Filmography ==
Year	Title	Role	Ref.
2015	So in Love	Producer	
2016	Kala & Jamal	Producer	
2016	Jacob’s Mansion	Producer	
2017	Benson’s Ville	Producer	
2019	Adaife	Producer	
2020	Betty’s Love Triangle	Producer	
2021	Tough Love	Executive producer	
2023	Shanty Town	Executive producer	
2023	Slum King	Executive producer	
2024	My Fairytale Wedding	Executive producer	

== Awards and nominations ==
Year	Award	Category	Nominated work	Result	Ref.
2023	Africa Magic Viewers' Choice Awards	Best Director Best Cinematographer Best Art Director Best Actress Best Sound Track Best make up Best sound Editor Best costume Designer Best Actor	Shanty Town	Nominated	
2023	Best of Nollywood Awards	Best Actress in English Movie Best Use of Make-Up Best Actor in an English Movie Best Actress in a Supporting Role English Movie of the Year	Shanty Town	Won	
2024	Africa Magic Viewers' Choice Awards	Best MNET Original Series	Slum King	Won	
2025	International Academy of Television Arts & Sciences	Elected Member ( International Emmy Awards)		Won	
2025	Africa Magic Viewers' Choice Awards ( AMVCA)	Best M-Net Original Series	My Fairytale Wedding	Won	
