= Lycée Français International Marcel Pagnol (Paraguay) =

- Spanish: Liceo Francés Internacional Marcel Pagnol
- Asunción; Paraguay

Information
- Age: 2 to 18
- Language: French
- Website: https://www.lfimp.education/

Lycée Français International Marcel Pagnol (Spanish: Liceo Francés Internacional Marcel Pagnol) is a French traditional school in Asunción, Paraguay. The school serves levels maternelle through lycée (senior high school).

== See also ==
- List of high schools in Paraguay
