= Lycée Français International Marcel Pagnol (Nigeria) =

French international school in Abuja, Nigeria

Coordinates: 9°N 7.45°E

- Abuja; Nigeria

Information
- School type: International School
- Established: 1998; 28 years ago
- Age: 3 to 18
- Language: French

Lycée Français International Marcel Pagnol, formerly École Française d'Abuja Marcel Pagnol, is a French international school in Kaura District, Abuja, Nigeria. It serves levels maternelle (preschool) through lycée (senior high school or sixth form). As of 2015 the school directly teaches until troisième and uses the National Centre for Distance Education (CNED) distance education programme for seconde and prèmiere ES.

It is adjacent to the Prince and Princess Estate and is in proximity to the Kaura Market, in southern Abuja.

== History ==
It opened in 1998 in a campus at Life Camp BNL; its current Prince and Princess Estate campus opened in April 2010. Construction began on the current campus in September 2009.

== See also ==
- Institut français du Nigeria
