= Lagos State Model College Kankon =

Secondary school in Lagos, Nigeria

Lagos State Senior Model College Kankon

Location
- Owode-Apa road Badagry, Lagos State; Nigeria

Information
- Type: boarding
- Established: 19 February 1988 (38 years ago)
- Founder: Lagos State Government
- Status: Open
- Gender: Mixed
- Campus type: Urban
- Website: http://lasmocksenior.com/

Lagos State Senior Model College Kankon is a state owned boarding secondary school located along Owode-Apa road of Badagry LGA, Lagos State. It was founded in 1988 during the military administration of Rear Admiral Mike Akhigbe (Rtd).In the 1990’s it was celebrated as the Best state-owned Secondary School in Nigeria.

== History ==
LASMOCK was one of the five model colleges established in each of the then five divisions of Lagos State. The school moved to its permanent site along Owode-Apa road on November 27, 1989. It was founded in 1988, along with four other model colleges under the military administration of Captain Okhai Mike Akhigbe, the then Military Governor of Lagos state. The College which was established along with four others took off at Government College, Ketu, Epe. The other four Model Colleges include Igbonla, Badore, Meiran and Igbokuta. From the period 1988-1992, the Colleges were given necessary foundation and focus on their mission as pacesetters in academics and co-curricular endeavours. The foundation Principal for Igbonla, Mr. James Akinola Paseda, doubled as the Co-ordinating Principal for the five Model Colleges at inception in February 1988. The pioneer Principal for Kankon was Mr. B.O. Owoade while the Vice-Principal was Mrs. M.O. Omoniyi.

== 2003 renaming ==
Since 2003, the school was renamed to Lagos State Senior Model College, Kankon. The junior section of the school was no longer under the administrative control of the school.

== Former principals ==
- Mr. B.O. Owoade, 1988 to 2005
- Chief Mrs. S.O.S. Olley, 2005 to 2011
- Mr. J.M. Ashaka, 2011 to 2013
- Mr. S. O. Fadahunsi, 2013 till date

== Notable alumni ==
- Joy Isi Bewaji, playwright and entrepreneur.
- Boy Spyce, singer and songwriter.
- Princess Damilola Sonayon-James, 2027 APC Deputy Governorship candidate.
- Hon. Taofik Adeniji- Adele, former Lagos State House of Assembly Member.
- Dj Ecool , Disco Jockey and music artist.
- Moyo Lawal, Nollywood Actress.
- Ortega Ogra, Senior Special Assistant on Digital/New Media to the President of Nigeria.
- Prince Oyekami Elegushi, GM of LASMIRA.
- Toyose Akerele-Ogunsiji, owner of RISE Network.
- Commodore Sewanu Babatunde Kuton, Nigerian Navy.
- Professor Joseph Nnanna, Chief Economist,Development Bank of Nigeria.
- Hon. Oladipo Olayinka Ajomale, Lagos State House of Assembly Member(2023- ).
