= Badagry Division =

Administrative division of Lagos State

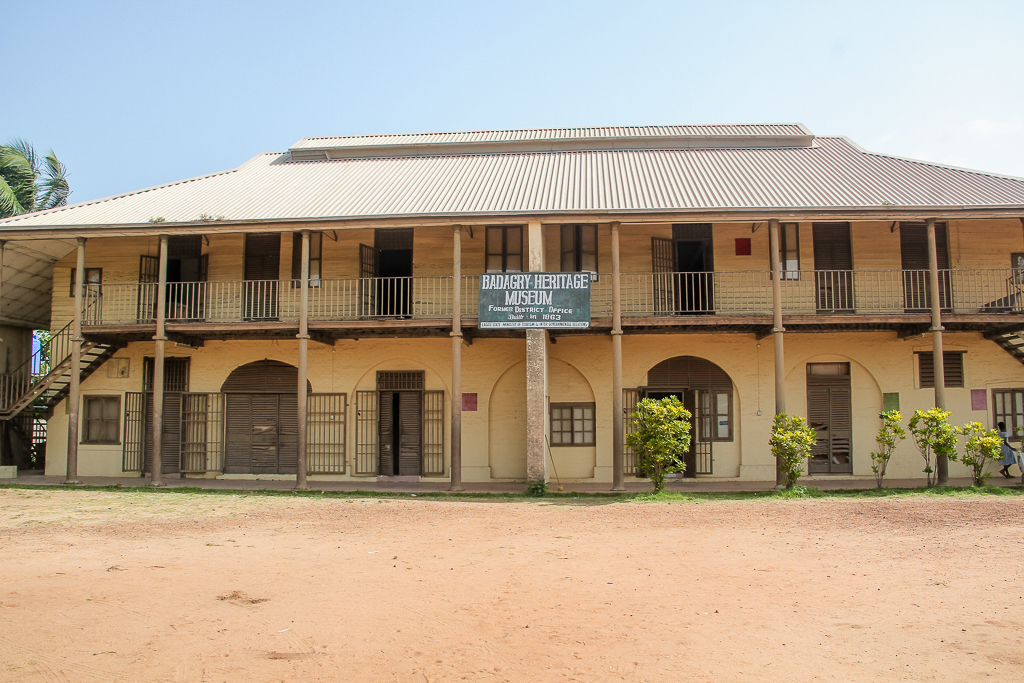
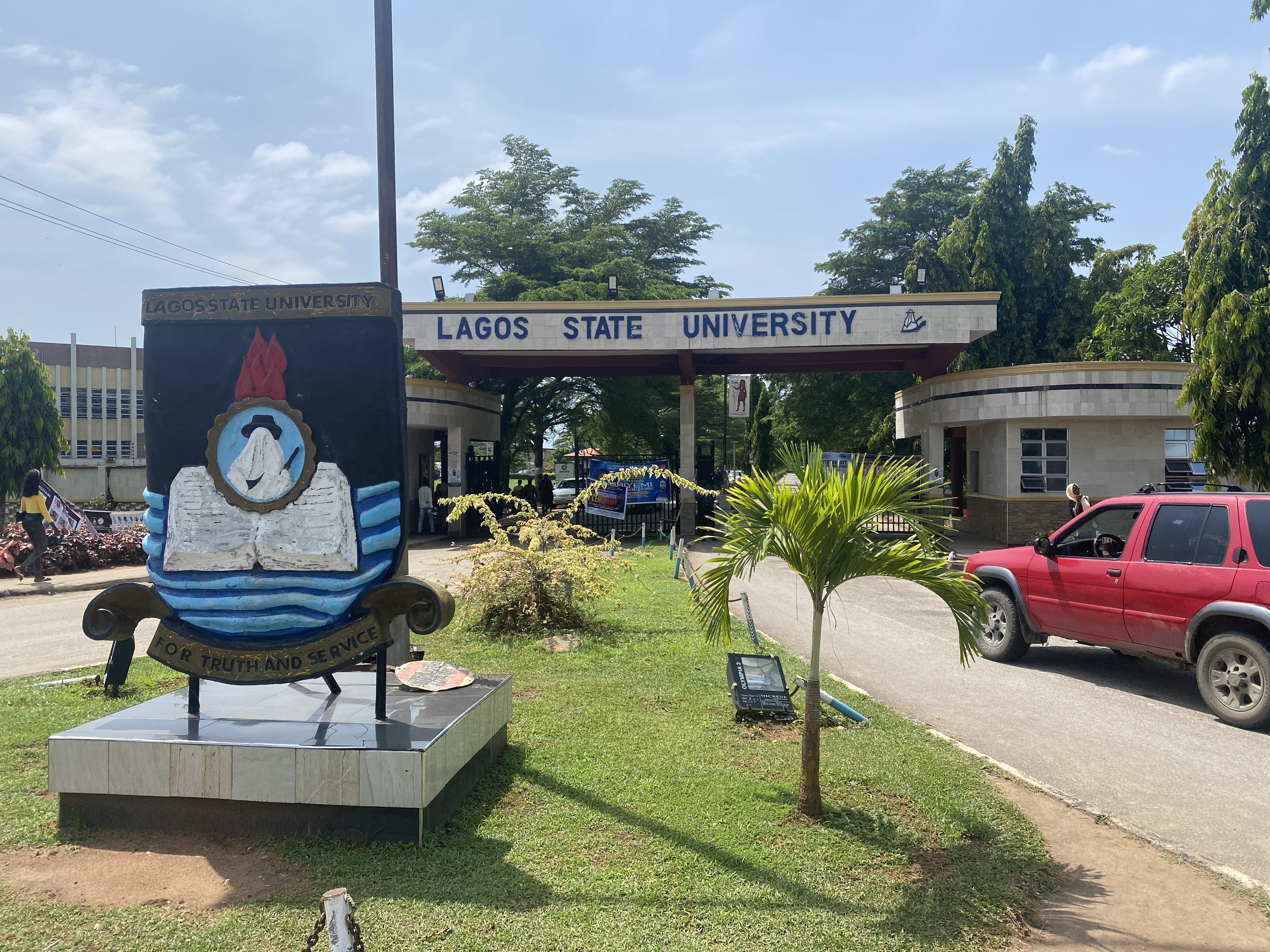
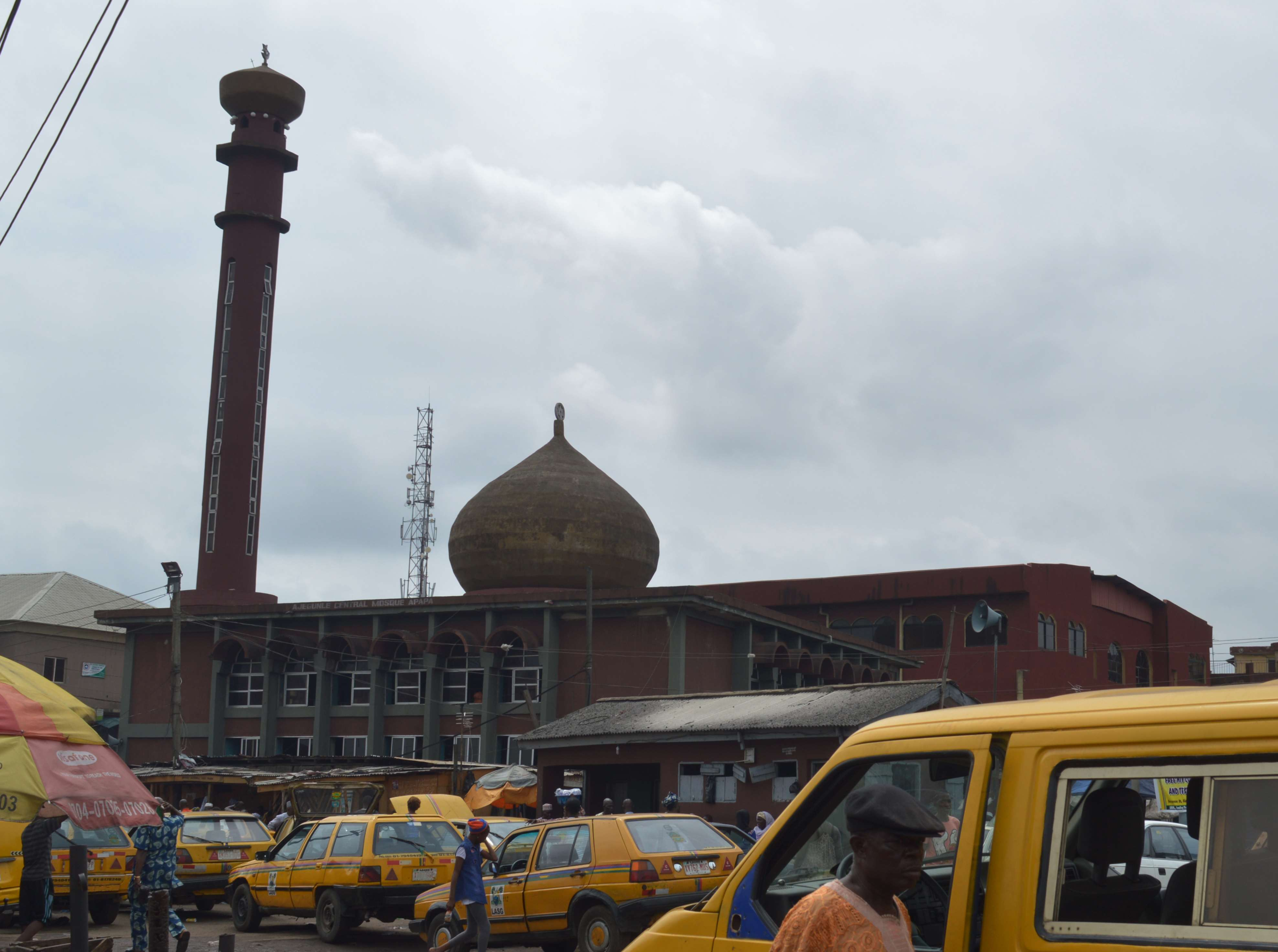
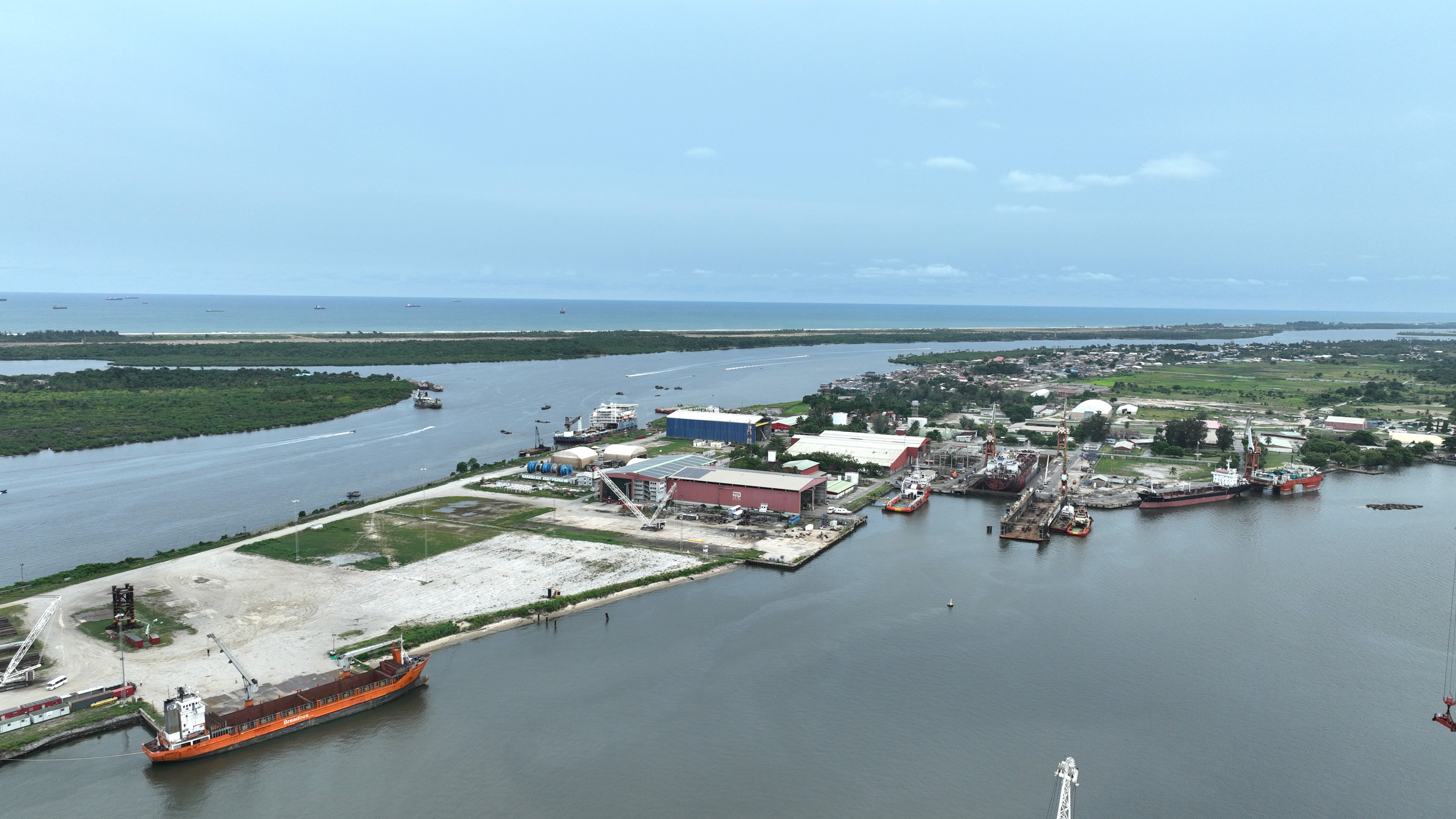
Clockwise from top: Badagry Heritage Museum; Ajegunle Central Mosque; Snake Island; Lagos State University

Badagry Division is an administrative division of Lagos State in Nigeria. It is one of five administrative divisions of Lagos State (the others being Ikorodu, Ikeja, Epe, and Lagos Island), and is further divided into four Local Government Areas (Badagry, Ojo, Amuwo-Odofin, and Ajeromi-Ifelodun).

== History ==
Named for the town of Badagry (also spelled Badagri), it was one of the five divisions of Lagos State established in 1968. Badagry Division figures in the history of relations and contact between Nigeria and Europe, as it was a major slave outpost and market prior to British colonization. With a history dating back nearly 593 years, the little coastal town and lagoon port is one of the most significant cities in Nigerian and African colonial history. It was also the place where, in 1842, Christianity was first preached in Nigeria; this is memorialized by the Agiya Tree Monument.

== Local government areas ==
Badagry Division consists of four local government areas:

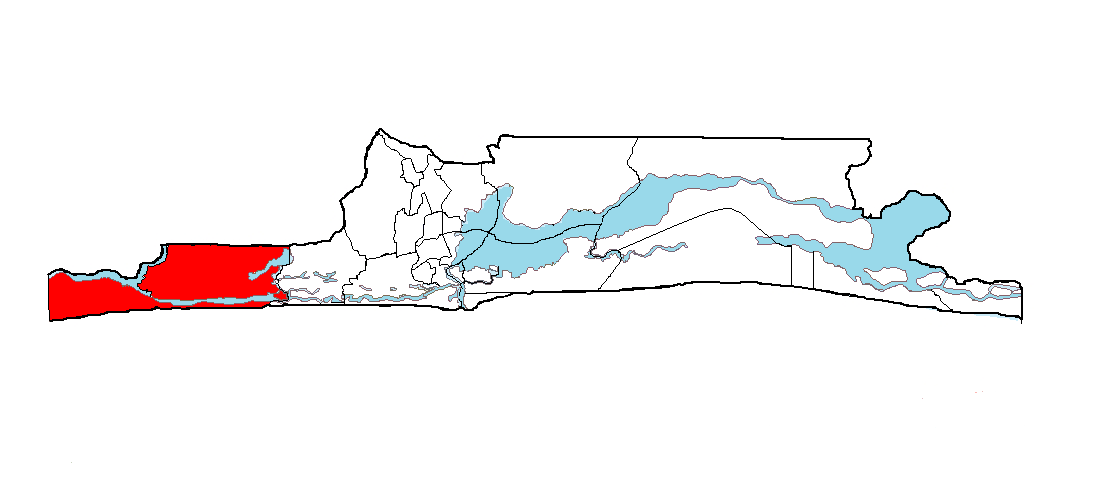
Badagry

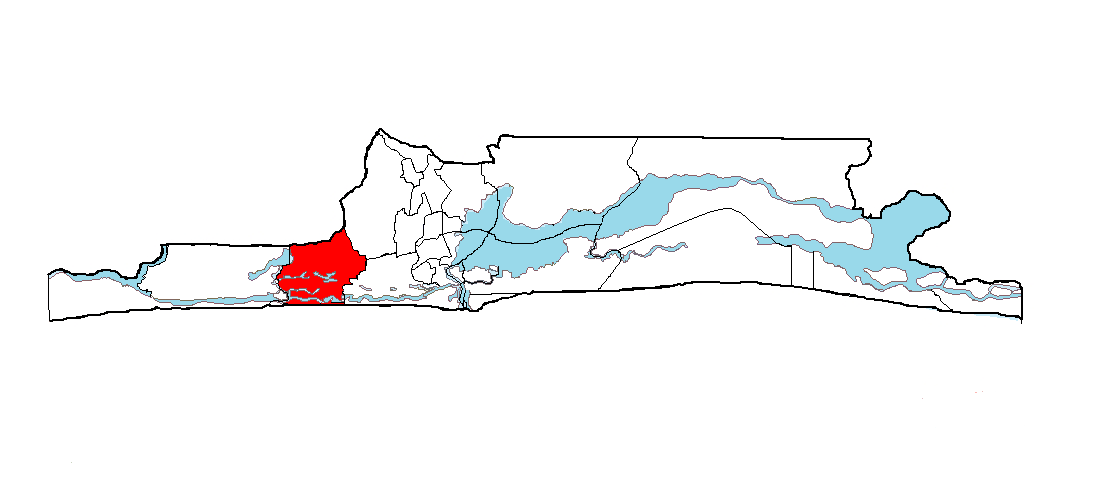
Ojo

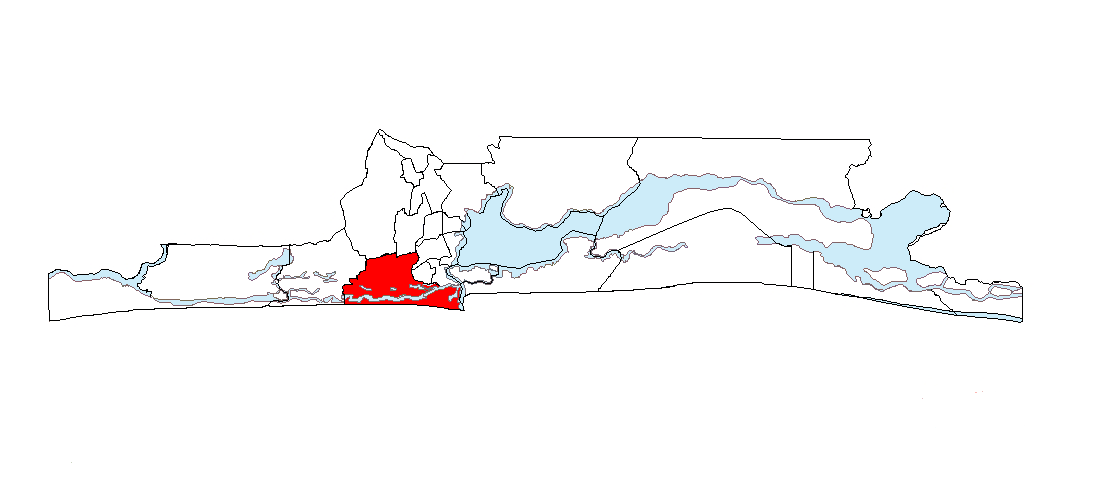
Amuwo-Odofin

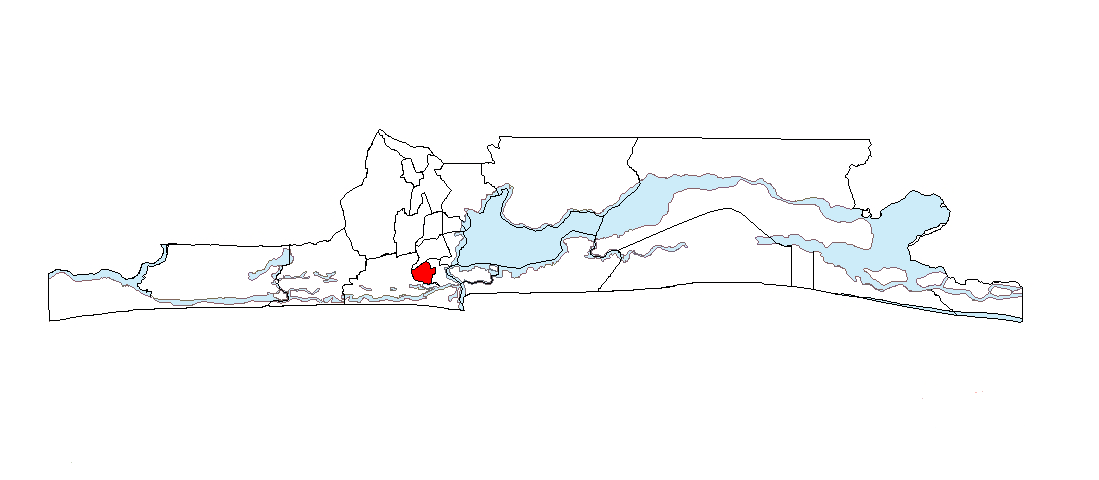
Ajeromi-Ifelodun

== Major settlements ==
- Aganrin
- Agonrin
- Ahanfe
- Ajara
- Ajido
- Akarakumo
- Akoko
- Apa
- Aradagun
- Aseri
- Badagry
- Berekete
- Ebiri
- Egan
- Ekunpa
- Epe
- Farasime
- Gayingbo-Topo
- Gbaji
- Ibereko
- Iragon
- Itoga
- Iyafin
- Kankon Moba
- Lopoji/Ropoji
- Mosafejo
- Mowo, Badagry
- Mushin
- Oke oko
- Oranyan
- Posi
- Pota
- Seme Border
- Tafi-Awori
- Wesere
- Yekeme
- Yeketome

=== Awori District settlements ===
In the Awori District are:

- Ado-Soba
- Agboju-Amuwo
- Agege
- Aiyetoro
- Ajangbadi (6.5232765°N 3.5407909°E): zip code 102104.
- Ajegunle
- Akesan town
- Alaba-Ore
- Amukoko
- Apa
- Awodi-Ora
- Festac Town
- Iba
- Ibereko
- Ibeshe
- Idoluwo-ile
- Igbanko
- Igede
- Ijanikin
- Ijegun
- Ijoiin
- Ilemba-Awori
- Ilogbo Elegba (6.46469°N 3.15730°E)
- Imore
- Ipaja
- Irede
- Irese
- Ishasi
- Isolo
- Itewe
- Itire
- Iyagbe
- Kirikiri
- Mebamu
- Mushin
- Ojo
- Oko-Afo
- Okokomaiko
- Ota
- Oto-Awori
- Satellite Town
- Sibiri

== Tourist sites and monuments ==
- Agia Cenotaph, Badagry – site where Christianity was first preached in Nigeria in 1842.
- Atlantic Slave Route/Port (Badagry – Marina and Gberefu Beach).
- Badagry Heritage Museum (Old British District Officer’s Building), Marina, Badagry.
- Early Missionaries’ Cemetery (1845), Hospital Road, Ahovikoh Quarters, Badagry.
- Eko University of Medicine and Health Sciences is located in Badagry Division.
- First Storey Building in Nigeria, – constructed by the CMS [Anglican Mission] in 1845.
- Lagos State University of Education (LASUED), Oto Awori.
- Lagos State University, [LASU], Ojo.
- Mobee Royal Family Slave Relics Museum, Badagry
- Nigeria French Language Village, Badagry, Inter-University Centre for French Language Studies
- Nigeria-Benin Republic International Border, Seme, Badagry.
- Ogu Stately Drums (Sato) introduced in 1543 – Akarakumo
- Ogu Toplisen Shrine, Hunto Quarters, Badagry – where Badagry Monarchs [Aholu] are crowned.
- Ologe Forest Reserve, Ologe, Oto Awori Town, off Badagry Expressway
- Palace of De Wheno Aholu (King) Menu Toyi 1, Akran of Badagry, Jegba Quarters.
- Relics of Slave Trade, Badagry-Mobee Compound, Seriki Abass Slave Barraccoon [1847]; Boeko, Boekoh Quarters
- Tomb of George Fremingo d. 1620, alias Huntokonu, first slave merchant in Badagry
- Trade Fair Complex, Ojo [site of annual Lagos International Trade Fair].
- Vlekete Slave Market, Posukoh Quarters – Badagry where John and Richard Lander were tried in 1825.
- Whispering Palms (Recreation Resort), Iworo.
