= Apa, Nigeria =

Apa may refer to:

- Apa, Benue, a locality in Benue State, Nigeria
- Apa, Lagos, a locality in Lagos State, Nigeria
