= Adeniran Ogunsanya College of Education =

Higher education institute in Lagos State, Nigeria

Coordinates: 6.500398°N 3.110834°E

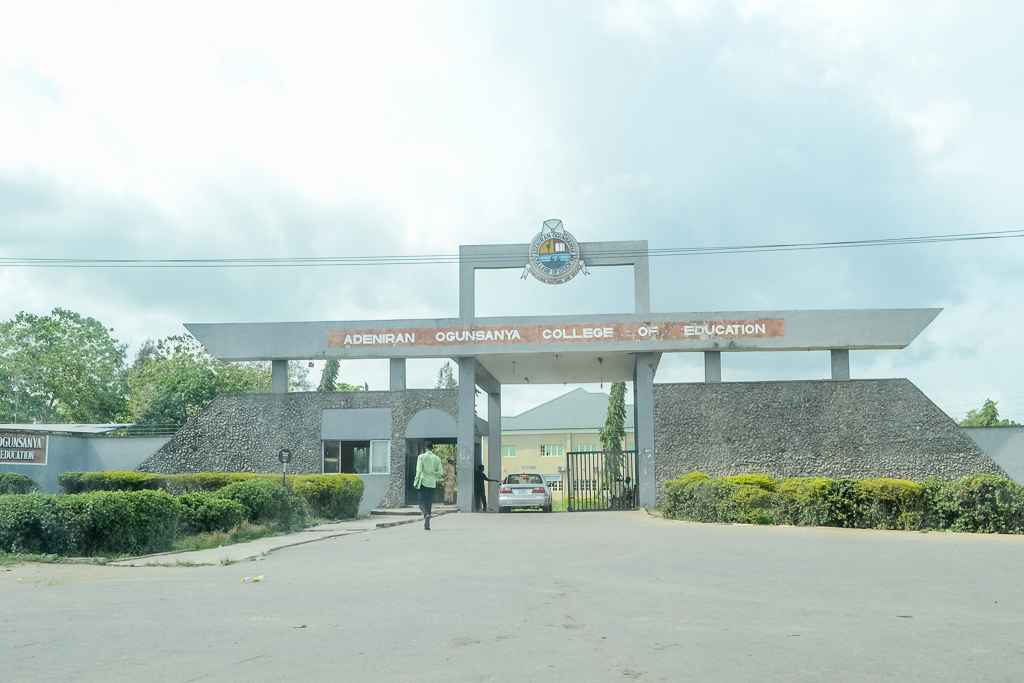
- Motto: Knowledge, Culture and Service
- Type: Public
- Established: 1958
- Provost: Omolola Ladele
- Location: Oto-Awori, Lagos State, Nigeria
- Website: Official website

Adeniran Ogunsanya College of Education, also known as AOCOED, is a higher education institute located in Oto-Awori community in the Oto-Awori area of Ojo, Lagos State. Adeniran Ogunsanya College of Education offers the award of Nigeria Certificate in Education (NCE) and undergraduate first degree courses in Education, having affiliated to Ekiti State University.

== History ==
The college, which was formerly called Lagos State College of Education, was established in 1958 as a Grade III teacher training college, matriculating about ninety students in its first year. In 1982, due to lack of basic infrastructure, modern facilities and an increasing population, the college was moved from Surulere to its present site in Oto-Awori.

== Notable alumni ==
- Kunle Ajayi
- Sarah Adebisi Sosan

== Notable faculty ==
- Afeez Oyetoro

== See also ==
- List of schools in Lagos
- List of colleges of education in Nigeria
