= Bolaji Robert =

Nigerian politician

Bolaji Kayode Robert is a Nigerian businessperson and politician, and currently serves as a commissioner in Lagos State, Nigeria.

He previously served as the executive chairman of the Oto-Awori Local Council Development Area of Lagos State between 2011 and 2015.

He currently serves as the commissioner of local government and community affairs of Lagos State, a position he has held since 2023 after being appointed by the executive governor of Lagos State.

Bolaji Robert was awarded the award of Local Government Chairman Award for the year 2012.
