= Ijanikin =

Ijanikin is a town located in Oto-Awori Local Council Development Area of Ojo Local Government Area of Lagos, Lagos state, Nigeria.

== People ==
Ijanikin is basically occupied by the Aworis since it is believed that they are the first settlers of the town. The town is traditionally ruled by a mornach Oba Mohmodu Afolabi Ashafa who is referred to as the Onijanikin of Ijanikin.

== Education ==
Ijanikin is home to several notable educational institutions

1. Federal Government College Lagos, Ijanikin

2. Lagos State University of Education, Oto-Ijanikin

3. National Postgraduate Medical College of Nigeria, Ijanikin

4. Eko University of Medical and Health Sciences, Ijanikin

5. Lagos State Government Secondary School, Ijanikin

6. Foreign Service Academy, Ijanikin
