= Adebola Akinola =

Nigerian gospel singer and performer

- Occupations: Singer; songwriter; performer; choir director
- Years active: 2022–present
- Known for: Gospel music and Yoruba-influenced performance
- Notable work: "Wonderful God"; "The Woman Whose Womb Carried the Village"
- Awards: Eko Best Female Vocalist / Best Vocal Performance Award (2026)

Adebola Akinola is a Nigerian gospel singer, songwriter, performer and choir director based in the United Kingdom. She began releasing recorded music in 2022 with the single “Wonderful God” and has also performed in theatrical and cultural productions incorporating Yoruba folklore.

== Early life and education ==
Akinola was born August 7 in Lagos State, Nigeria. She earned a degree in Music Education from Adeniran Ogunsanya College of Education and a degree in Library and Information Science from Kwara State University, Malete. She had musical training from Musical Society of Nigeria (MUSON).

Before relocating to the United Kingdom, Akinola was involved in church music in Nigeria, including work as a worship leader, choir director and music minister.

== Music career ==
In 2022, Akinola released “Wonderful God.” The song was first released on Boomplay and later made available on other digital music services in 2026, according to The Punch. The newspaper said the song had already garnered over 8,000 listeners on Boomplay before it was released more widely.

In May 2026, Vanguard reported on the wider release of “Wonderful God” and described Akinola as a Nigerian gospel artist, worship minister and choir director based in the UK. The article also discussed the release of the album ‘Sovereignty’ in 2023.

== Performance work ==
In March 2026, Akinola performed in The Woman Whose Womb Carried the Village, a live music work staged as part of Soap Box Spotlight at the Showroom Cinema in Sheffield. The production was created with Toby Williams, Gideon Olajide and Segun Lawal, presented by SBC Theatre and supported by Showroom Cinema, the Paul Hamlyn Foundation and Arts Council England. Based on Yoruba folklore, the piece tells the story of Morẹnikẹ, a woman ostracised by her community due to infertility. Reviewing the performance for The Guardian Nigeria, Michael Kolawole described Akinola's vocal delivery as restrained and intense and noted its exploration of love, forgiveness and judgement, while noting criticism of elements such as the character's unanswered prayer and the village's culpability.

New Telegraph reported in April 2026 that Akinola was among the performers at the Sheffield Soap Box event at Showroom Cinema. In May 2026, the newspaper reported that her single "Wonderful God", released in 2022, had become available internationally, and referred to Sovereignty as an album released in 2023.

== Awards and recognition ==
In 2023, Akinola received an Award of Excellence at the Kwara Province 1 Music Competition, where The Punch reported that she was named Overall Best Winner and Best Vocalist. The information was included in the newspaper's coverage of the subsequent release of “Wonderful God”.

In September 2026, THISDAY reported that Akinola received the Eko Best Female Vocalist / Best Vocal Performance Award at the sixth Eko Heritage Awards, held at the Lagos Oriental Hotel in Lagos.
