= Amuwo-Odofin =

- LGA
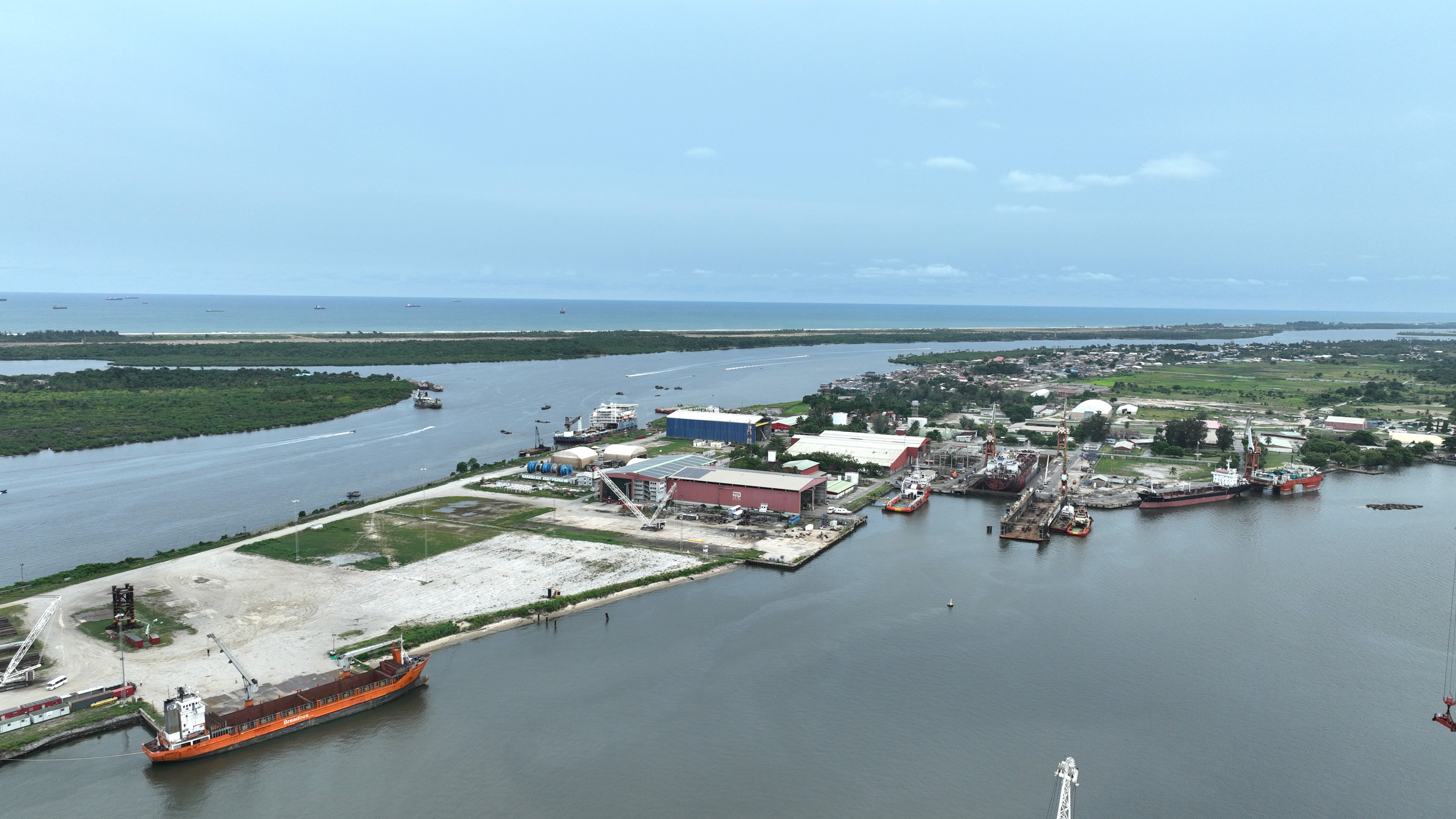
- Aerial view of Snake Island, located within Amuwo-Odofin LGA
- Interactive map of Amuwo-Odofin
- Coordinates: 6°27′N 3°16′E
- Country: Nigeria
- State: Lagos State
- Headquarter: Festac Town

Government
  - Local Government Chairman: Prince Lanre Sanusi

Population (2006)
  - Total: 1,500,000
- Time zone: UTC+1 (WAT)
- Website: www.amuwo-odofin.gov.ng

Amuwo-Odofin is a local government area (LGA) in the Badagry Division, Lagos State, Nigeria. It is located within Lagos Metropolis.

As of July 2025 the Executive Chairman of Amuwo-Odofin Local Government Area is Prince Lanre Sanusi, who assumed office following the July 2025 local government elections.

Amuwo Odofin LGA is divided into Oriade and Amuwo Local Council Development Area (LCDA) with 7 wards each; Abule-osun, Agboju, Ibeshe, Ijegun, Irede, Kirikir and Kuje wards constitute Oriade LCDA and Ado-soba, Ekoakete, Ifelodun, Ilado Tamaro, Irepodun, Odofin and Orire wards comprising Amuwo LCDA.

Spread among the 14 wards are 67 communities, 12 of which are Urban, 8 semi-urban and 47 rural. Amuwo Odofin LGA has a population density of approximately 300,000 people per square kilometre.

The LGA, with a population of over 1,500,000 according to the 2006 Census shares its boundaries with Ajeromi and Ifelodun LCDA in the East, Oriade LCDA in the West, the Badagry Creek to the South and Isolo/Igando LCDA to the North.

== Administration ==
The Executive Chairman (Local Government Chairman) is the political head of the council. In July 2025 Prince Lanre Sanusi was declared winner in the Amuwo-Odofin chairmanship contest and later presented with his Certificate of Return as part of the LASIEC ceremony for winners.

== The Activities of Amuwo Odofin ==
Since assuming office in July 2025, Chairman Prince Lanre Sanusi has initiated several developmental activities in Amuwo-Odofin LGA:

- Environmental Sanitation & Beautification – clearing of street traders and illegal structures to restore orderliness and improve the aesthetics of Festac and surrounding communities.
- Road Rehabilitation – commencement of palliative road works in key areas such as Mile 2, Agboju, and Festac Link Bridge axis to improve traffic flow and reduce congestion.
- Healthcare Support – free medical outreach programmes in partnership with NGOs to provide residents with access to basic healthcare and awareness campaigns.
- Youth & Empowerment Programs – vocational training initiatives for young people in ICT, fashion, and business skills aimed at reducing unemployment.
- Community Engagement – active town hall meetings with residents across wards to ensure inclusiveness in governance and transparency in decision making.

== Name variants ==
Some social media and local posts reference alternate name forms for the current chairman (for example posts using "Prince Ismail", "Olanrewaju Ismail" or similar variants), while national newspapers most commonly refer to him as "Prince Lanre Sanusi".
