= Henry Townsend (missionary) =

British missionary in Nigeria (1815–1886)

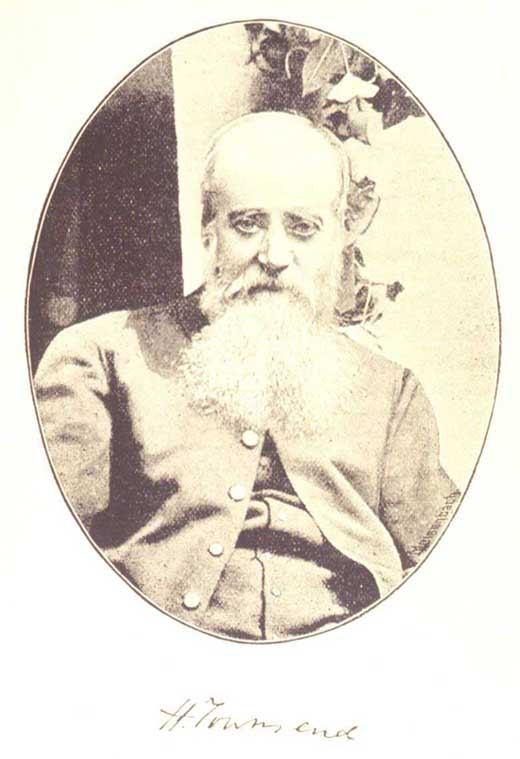
Portrait of Henry Townsend

Henry Townsend (1815–1886) was an Anglican missionary in Nigeria.

== Early life ==
Townsend was born in Exeter, Devon, England, on 1 December 1815.

Ordained in England in 1842, Townsend set off for Sierra Leone with Charles Andrew Gollmer and Samuel Ajayi Crowther, landing there that same year; after working there only a few months, he was transferred to the Yoruba mission. He returned to England for a year, then travelled to Abeokuta in Nigeria.

== Career ==
From 1846 to 1867, he based his mission in Abeokuta. Thomas Birch Freeman was actually the first European to enter Abeokuta. He arrived there on 11 December 1843. When he returned to Badagry on 24 December, he met Rev. Townsend and they celebrated Christmas Day together sharing the Gospel in Badagry. According to Ajisafe, he was the first European person to enter Abeokuta, arriving there on 4 January 1843 and was 'given a grand reception' (Ajisafe 1924: 85).

Working with Samuel Crowther, a Yoruba Anglican priest, Townsend wrote several hymns in Yoruba and aided in the compilation of Crowther's Yoruba primer. Townsend was against Crowther, a native Yoruba, becoming a bishop.

Townsend published a Yoruba newspaper called 'Iwe-Irohin' in 1859. (Note: Iwe Irohin or Iwe Irohin fun awon Ebga) This is said to have started off the print media in Nigeria, as the newspaper was the bilingual paper in Nigeria. The paper used 8 years before it demise.

In 1862, he opened an orphanage and several trade schools.

From 1871 to 1872 Rev Henry and Mrs Townsend were co-principals of CMS Female Institution Lagos Nigeria.

Townsend retired in 1876. His journals and letters are held at the University of Birmingham and Oxford University.

== Publications ==
Townsend published several books including two Yoruba school-books and;

- Hymn Book in Yoruba
- Primer in Yoruba
- Book of Common Prayer in Yoruba
- Peep of Day in Yoruba

== Family ==
Townsend married Sarah Pearse in 1840.

== See also ==
- Agiya Tree Monument
- Egba people
