= Afeez Oyetoro =

Nigerian comic actor

- Born: 20 August 1963 (age 63); Iseyin, Oyo State, Nigeria
- Other name: Saka
- Education: Obafemi Awolowo University; University of Ibadan
- Occupations: Actor; Comedian; Scholar
- Known for: Clown roles in films
- Television: Hustle
- Spouse: Olaide Oyetoro
- Children: 3
- Parent: Pa Oyetoro (father)

Afeez Oyetoro (born 20 August 1963) is a Nigerian comedian, theatre actor and artist popularly known as "Saka". His parents had eight children, of whom he is the fifth. He is currently married and has three children. He is also a lecturer of theatre arts at Adeniran Ogunsanya College of Education.

== Early life and education ==
Afeez Oyetoro was born on 20 August 1963 in the Iseyin Local Government Area of Oyo State, in southwestern Nigeria. Afeez obtained bachelor's and master's degrees in Theatre Arts from Obafemi Awolowo University (OAU) and the University of Ibadan (UI) respectively. He is currently a doctorate degree holder from the University of Ibadan in Oyo State, Nigeria.

== Career ==
Afeez Oyetoro is known for his clown role in Nollywood movies and has featured in several Nigerian movies. He is currently a lecturer in the Department of Theatre Art at Adeniran Ogunsanya College of Education.

In 2016, Afeez Oyetoro appeared in the film The Wedding Party and the comedy-crime/heist film Ojukokoro (Greed).

He was recently elected as vice president of the Golden Movie Ambassadors Association of Nigeria (TGMAAN) in 2022.

== Personal life ==
Afeez Oyetoro is married to Olaide Oyetoro, and has three children; two sons, Abdullah and Mumin Oyetoro, and a daughter, Rodiat Oyetoro.

His family's background remains private, but he lost his mother, aged 92 in 2019, while his father, who lived to 98, was a significant influence in his life. Born with a lighter complexion and often called 'Albino' due to his unique features, including a diastema, he embraced the nicknames, considering them advantageous and contributing to positive experiences in his life.

In a July 2025 interview with Chude Jideonwo, Oyetoro said that a lack of financial stability early in his acting career undermined his confidence and made it difficult to pursue relationships, recalling that he could not afford a car and that many people did not take actors seriously at the time. He recounted that a woman he had wanted to marry insisted he first own two cars, an experience that convinced him she was not the right partner for him; he said he eventually married after starting his lecturing career.

== See also ==
- List of Yoruba people
