= Seme, Nigeria =

Seme
- Seme Border shown within Nigeria
- Coordinates: 6°22′55″N 2°43′20″E
- Country: Nigeria
- State: Lagos State
- LGA: Badagry
- Time zone: UTC+1 (CET/WAT)

Seme is a settlement in Nigeria on the border with Benin, thirty minutes drive from Badagry on the coastal road between Lagos and Cotonou. Seme is a part of Badagry Division of Lagos State. With the present political division in the state, it is under Badagry -West Local council development area (LCDA).

A new multilateral facility for the border post was formally opened on 23 October 2018.

At least three times in the 2005-2009 period violence has broken out in the border town, with fatal consequences. It is reportedly a regular occurrence for Nigerian officials to harass travelers for money at the border or at checkpoints along the road leading from the border. The drive time between Badagry and Seme border has been tripled by the presence of these illegal checkpoints instituted to extort travelers. Of particular mention are the Immigration officers who engage in daylight robbery. The border post is poorly organized, without proper vehicle routing and inspection stations. Some of the Nigerian positions have been inside Beninese territory since April 6, 2001. This confusion is exploited by smugglers. Seme is a major crossing point for immigrants entering or leaving Nigeria illegally, and for smugglers of marijuana and other illegal goods due to its porosity.

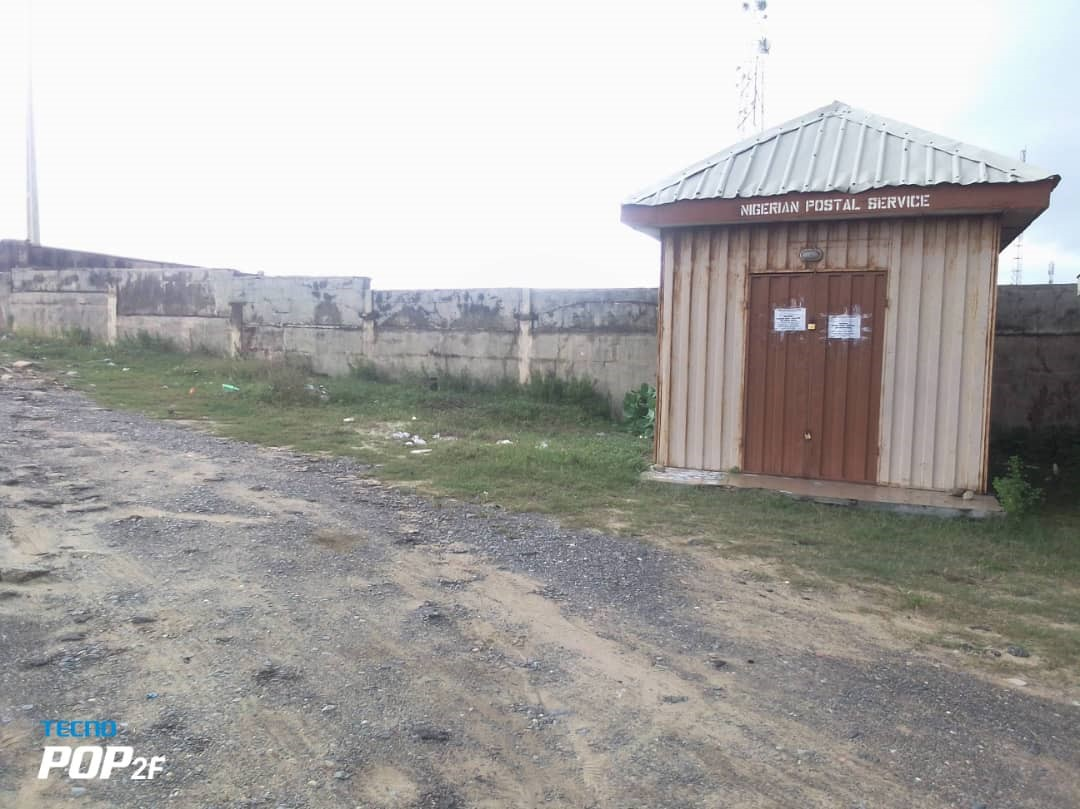
Containerized Post Office, Seme Border

SON unveils Seme Border operations to check influx of substandard products and also the Seme border Command of the Nigeria Customs Service, NCS, collected N701.5 million as revenue in August 2017 and recently they generated N1.1 billion in September 2017. It is however sad to note that this settlement has been in utter darkness for more than a decade. It lacks all social amenities as it has been neglected by the government in every respect.

Today dated October 17, 2017, Federal Government to lift the ban on importation of used vehicles through the borders as the president and chairman of the board, saying it was against Association of Registered Freight Forwarders Nigeria, ARFFN's constitution to lay embargo on vehicles brought into Nigeria economy.
