= Tomb of George Freemingo Huntokonu =

Historical site in Nigeria

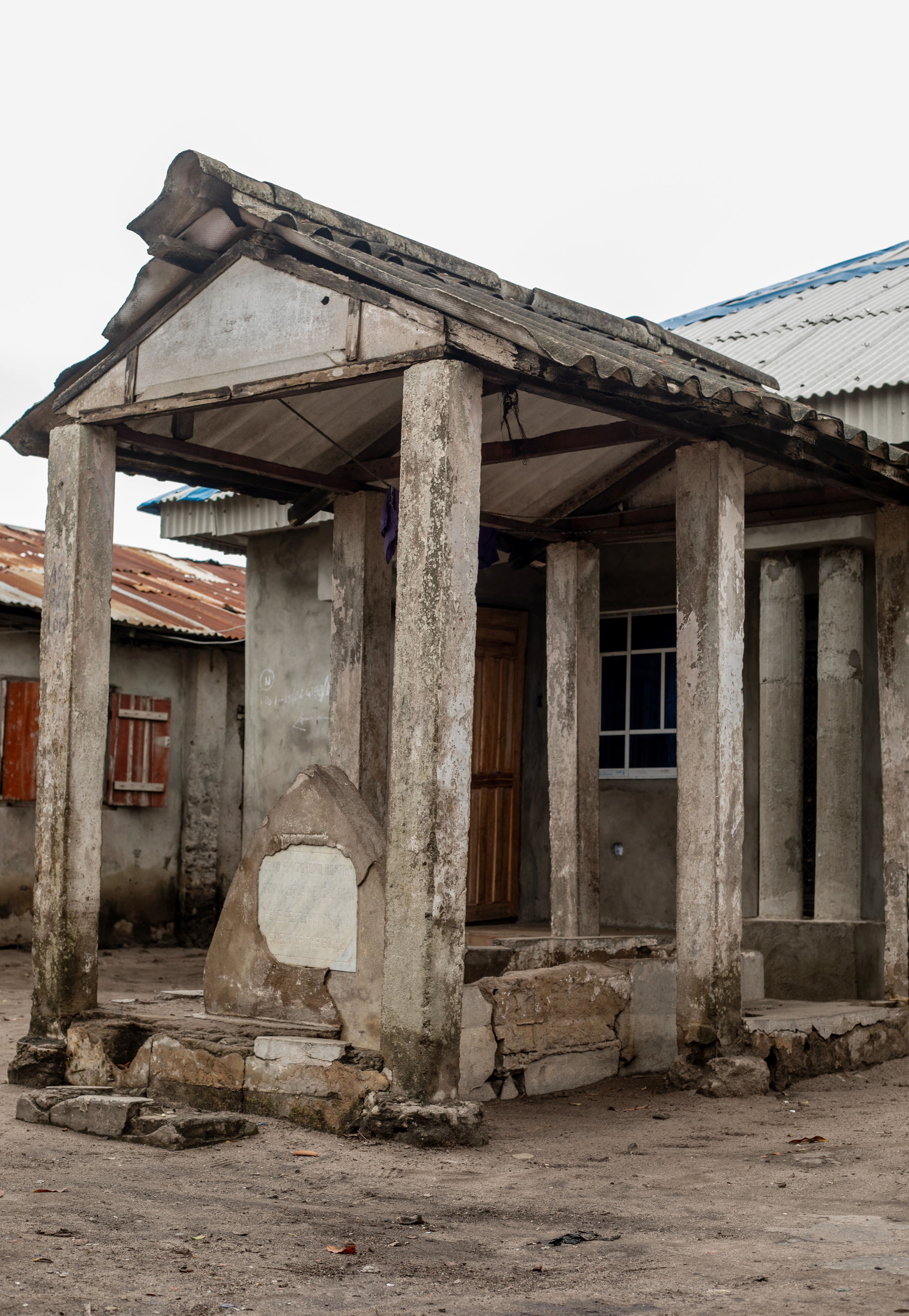
Tomb of George Freemingo Huntokonu in 2024

The Tomb of George Freemingo Huntokonu is a historical site located in Badagry, Lagos State, Nigeria. The tomb is the final resting place of George Freemingo Huntokonu, a Portuguese slave merchant who played a significant role in the transatlantic slave trade during the 17th century.

== History ==
George Freemingo Huntokonu was a Portuguese trader who settled in Badagry, a key trading environment along the west African coast. He was involved in commercial activities, primarily slave trade, and he facilitated exchange between European merchants and African kingdoms. He was assassinated around 1620.

His tomb, situated near the Methodist church and close to the palace of the Akran of Badagry, is considered an important artifact of the region's colonial and slave trade history.
