= Agiya Tree Monument =

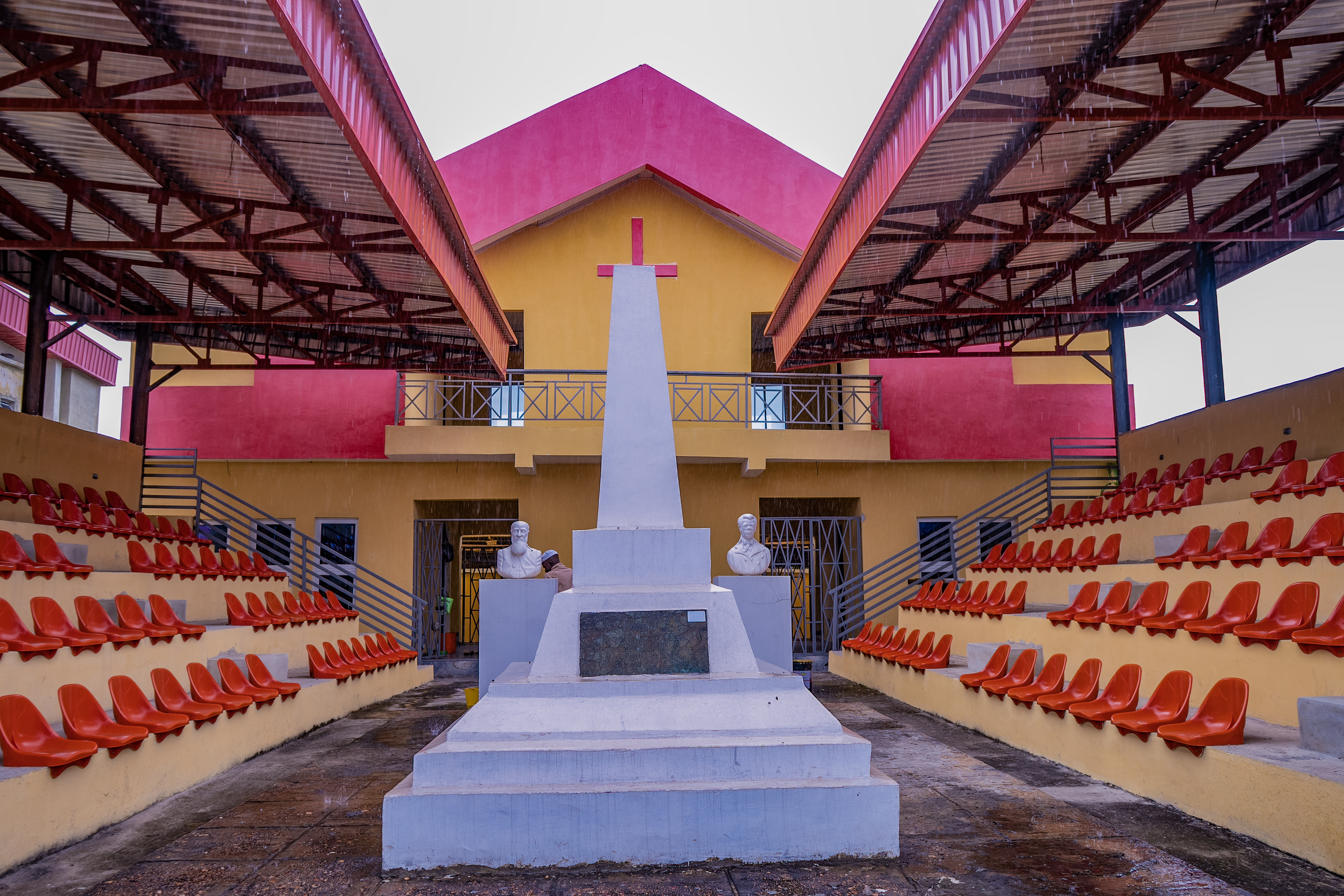
The obelisk erected in place of the Agia Tree

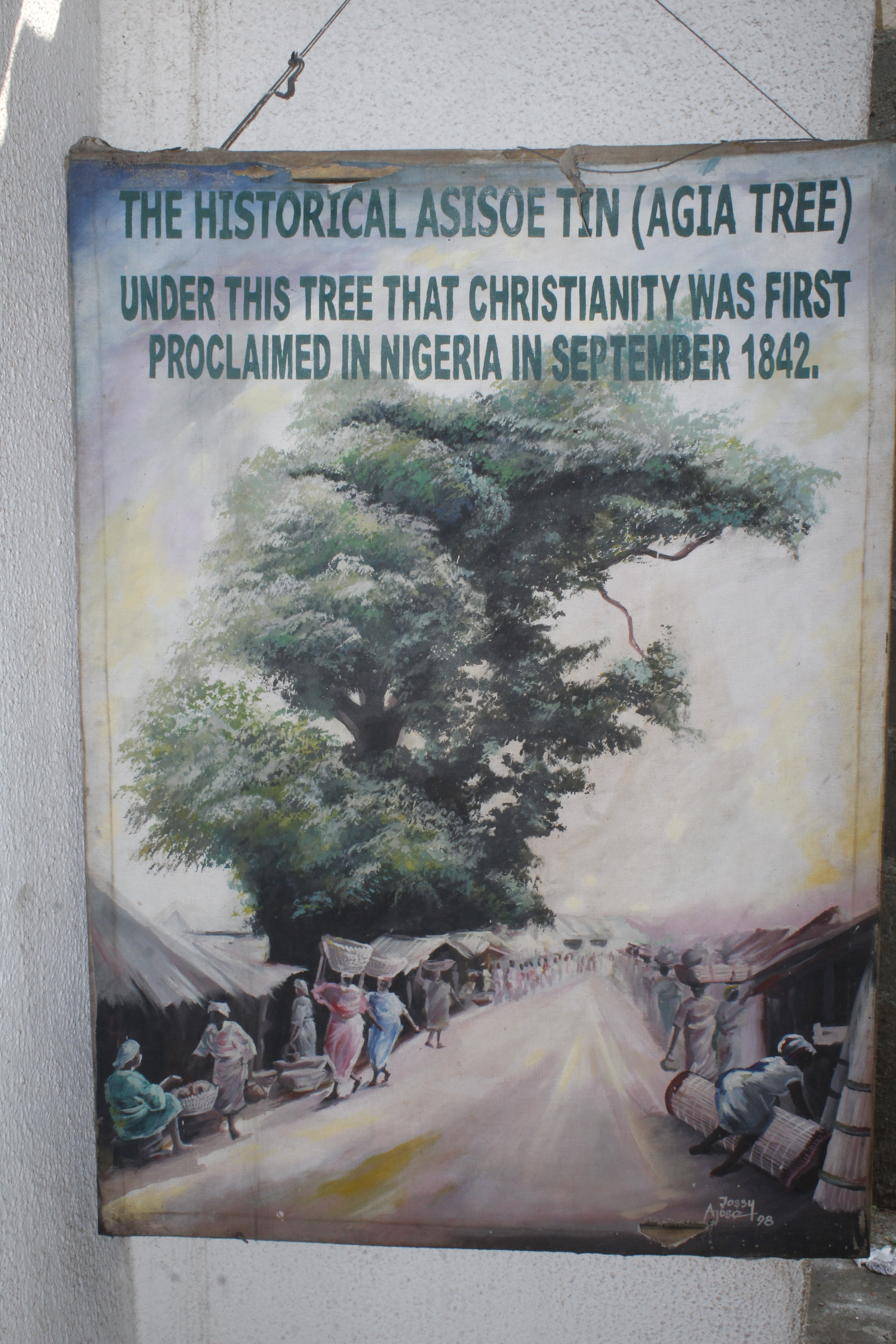
Picture of the Agia Tree where Christianity was first proclaimed in Nigeria

The Agia Tree Monument Agiya Tree Monument is on the site once occupied by the Agia Tree (Egun: Asisoe Tin) close to the Badagry Town Hall. The Agiya tree was a 49 metres (160 ft) tree with a circumference of 9.1 metres (30 ft). Significantly remarkable for being the tree under which Christianity was first preached in Nigeria by Thomas Birch Freeman and Henry Townsend on 24 September 1842, the tree lived for over 300 years until it was uprooted by a storm on 20 June 1959.
