= Ojo, Lagos =

Town in Lagos, Nigeria

Ojo
- LGA and town
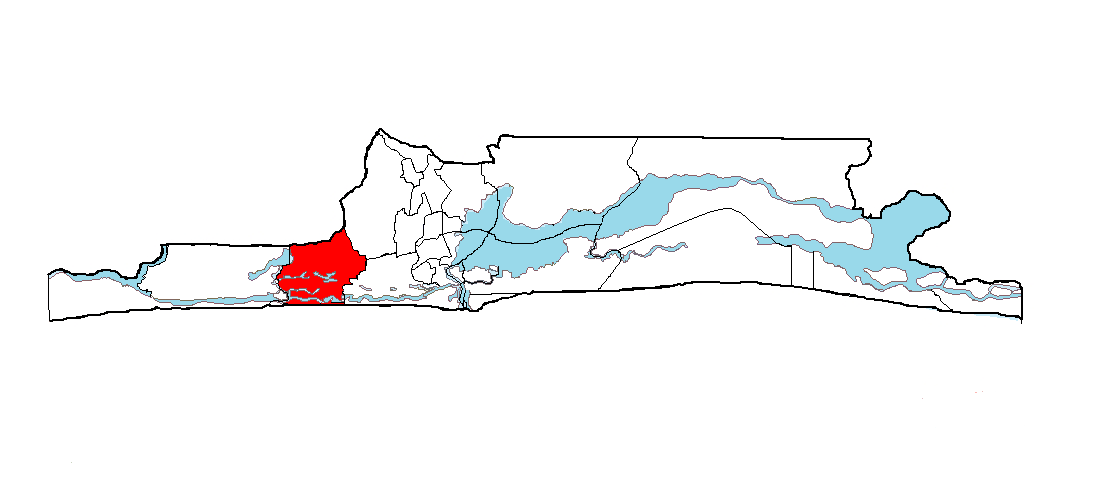
- Ojo shown within the State of Lagos
- Interactive map of Ojo
- Location within Nigeria
- Coordinates: 6°28′N 3°11′E
- Country: Nigeria
- State: Lagos State
- Established: 16th century
- Founder: Esugbemi (from Awori subgroup of the Yoruba)

Government
  - Olojo: Adeniyi Rufai
  - Local government Chairman: Muibat Rufai-Adeyemi

Area H
  - Total: 182 km^{2} (70 sq mi)

Population (2006 census)
  - Total: 609,173
  - Estimate (2016): 838,900
  - Density: 3,350/km^{2} (8,670/sq mi)

Notable Places: 1. Alaba International Market; 2. Lagos State University 3. Lagos–Badagry Expressway 4. Ojo Military Cantonment 5. Lagos International Trade Fair Complex; 6. Nigerian Railway Corporation (NRC) Station
- Time zone: UTC+1 (WAT)

Ojo is a town and local government area in Badagry Division, Lagos State, Nigeria, with a few notable locations such as Lagos State University and the Alaba International Market, as well as others. Ojo is located on the eastern section of the Trans–West African Coastal Highway, about 37 km west of Lagos city proper. It is a part of the Lagos Metropolitan Area.

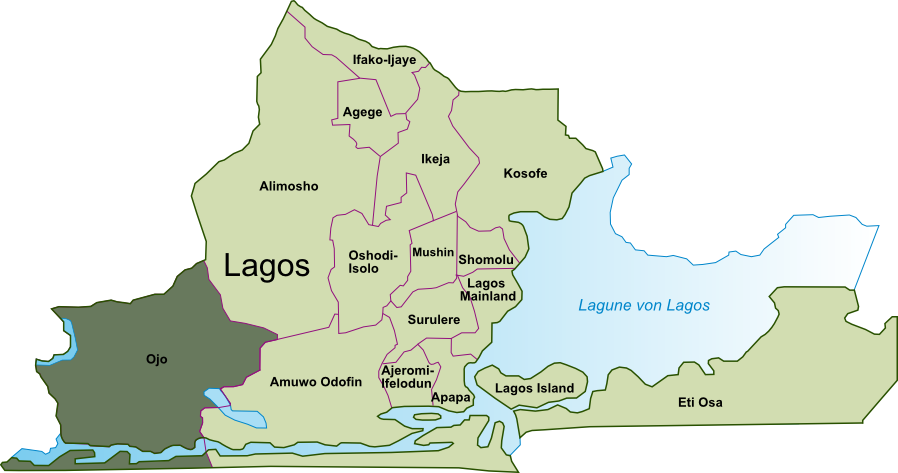
Location of Ojo in the Lagos Metropolitan Area

Ojo is a primarily residential town, although it contains some major markets, including Alaba International Market, Alaba Livestock Market (Alaba Rago), the old Lagos International Trade Fair complex, and Iyana-Iba Market. It also houses the divisional headquarters of the 81st Division of the Nigerian Army and Navy Town.

South of the town (across Badagry Creek), the rest of the local government area is more sparsely populated and consists of mangrove swamps and sandy beaches. Some of these beaches become holiday spots during the festive season. Wildlife mostly consists of reptiles, rodents and birds, including crocodiles, iguanas, monitor lizards, and squirrels. Whales and dolphins have been known to visit the coastal areas near Ojo.

== History ==
Oral tradition states that Ojo was founded by Esugbemi, his wife Erelu, and chief priest Osu when they migrated from Ile-Ife to form a settlement named Ilufe. Esugbemi was a hunter who explored the swamp forests in the area, which later became the town. During his expeditions, he became convinced that he ought to expand the settlement. Osu consulted an oracle, which affirmed his decision at Ikemo in the present-day Olojo District. The new town invited other Awori settlers from Iddo Island and Idumota, who built Irewe Osolu, south of Oto-Awori.

The western (Oto-Awori) and northern (Iba and Igbo-elerin) parts of Ojo developed independently as a result of the settlement of later Awori migrants from Ile-Ife. The migrants first settled in Obadore in Iba before expanding towards the west and southwest. Oto-Awori was ruled by a baale until a king was first nominated. This nomination was opposed by the oracle, which led to the formation of Oto-Awori and Otto-Iddo. Eventually, an Oba from Oto-Awori ascended the throne in the late 18th century to rule alongside the Olojo of Ojo.

The Ojo local government was created in May 1989 under the military administration of General Ibrahim Babangida as the president of Nigeria. The military governor of Lagos State was then Brigadier General Raji Rasaki. Before the creation of the Ojo local government out of the old Badagry local government, the area was adjudged the most populous in the country according to the National Population Census conducted in Nigeria in 1991. According to the 2006 census, the population of the area was 609,173: 315,401 males and 293,772 females. 62.3 percent of inhabitants were 15-64 years old, 36.3 percent were 0-14 years old, and 1.4 percent were 65 and over.

== Transportation ==
Transportation in the area is mainly by road. The Trans-West African Coastal Highway runs from west to east through the town and divides it into two halves. Olojo Drive, Old Ojo Road, Kemberi Road, and Alaba Road are the main roads in the southern half of the town. In the northern half, Chief Esan Way, Iyana-Ipaja Road, and Igbo-Elerin Road are major roads.

Ojo is located on a peninsula and ferry services and speed boats are available through Badagry Creek with jetties at Muwo, Shibiri, and off Olojo Drive. A railway line from Lagos through Ojo is under construction and there are high expectations that it will alleviate the perpetual traffic jams within the area.

== Culture ==
Ojo is known for the Olojo festival during which the Olojo wears the crown. Oro festivals are held at the death of the Olojo or a baale. Oro has drawn controversy for some of the elements of the festival, which according to some are misogynistic. Other festivals include Egungun, Obaluwaye, Sango, Ogun, Ota, and Osun which are named after the deities or heroes that they celebrate. Iyemoja and Gelede and Alaalu are some other festivities that are celebrated in the Oto-Awori district.
