= Apa, Lagos =

Community in Lagos, Nigeria

Apa is a historic community in Badagry Division of Lagos State, Nigeria. It is one of the oldest settlements in Badagry. The community has an Oba, the Alapa of Apa. The majority of people from Apa are of Awori and Ogu heritage.

Located in the Northwest of Badagry Division, the settlement is bordered to the north by the Badagry creek and in the east by Badagry town and to the south are Ewe settlements close to the Atlantic.

Founded around the fifteenth century by Awori migrants, the community along with Ekpe grew in the early 1700s when both settlements became the major centers of the Trans-Atlantic slave trade along the Porto-Novo and Badagry creeks. Circa 1730, Hontokonu (Hendrik Hertog), a European slave trader originally settled at Apa before moving to Badagry. Badagry soon eclipsed Apa as a center of commerce in the region.

In the eighteenth century, migrants in the west from Gbe communities fleeing King Agaja later assimilated with the Yoruba speaking people of Apa.
