= Festac Town =

Federal housing estate in Nigeria

Festac Town is a federal housing estate in Lagos, Nigeria. Its name is derived from the acronym FESTAC, which stands for Second World African Festival of Arts and Culture that was held there in 1977. Festac Town is within the Amuwo-Odofin local government area.

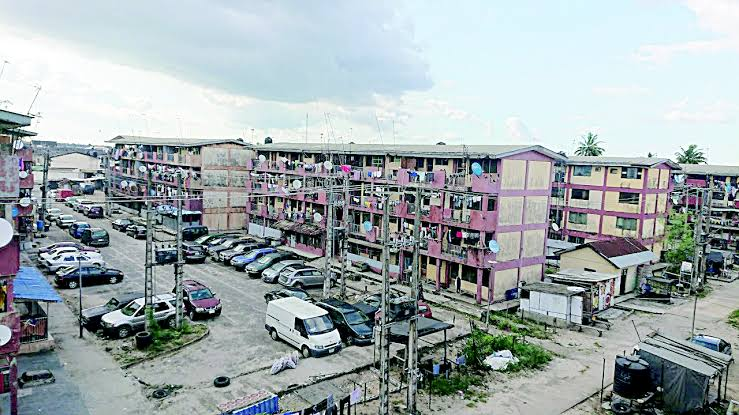
Festac Houses

== History ==
Festac Town, originally referred to as "Festival Town" or "Festac Village", is a residential estate designed to house the participants of the Second World Festival of Black Arts and Culture of 1977 (Festac77). Consisting of 5,000 contemporary dwelling units and seven major avenues, the town was designed in an efficient grid in order to accommodate upwards of 45,000 visitors as well as any Nigerian employees and officers working at the Festival. The Nigerian government invested substantial sums of money and resources into building Festac Town, which sported state of the art electrical generators, police and fire stations, access to public transportation, supermarkets, banks, health centres, public restrooms, and postal services. The village was therefore intended to evoke the modern age and the promise of state-sponsored economic development fuelled by oil revenues.

After the Festival, the Federal Government of Nigeria allocated the housing and landed properties to eventual winners who participated in a ballot. Initial regulations forbade such winners from renting and disposing-of the properties to third parties. The first festival was held in 1966 at Dakar, Senegal.

In 2005, Robyn Dixon of the Los Angeles Times, while discussing advance-fee scams, known as 419 in Nigeria, stated that Festac Town was "at the center of the cyber-scam universe." The Associated Press wrote that year that the community "has become notorious for" 419, and that it was a place "where the scammers ply their schemes".

== Layout ==
Festac town is built in a grid network consisting of seven major roads/boulevards or avenues from which minor roads extend. These avenues are identified by their numbers: 1st, 2nd, 3rd, 4th, 5th, 6th and 7th Avenues respectively. The 1st, 2nd, 4th and 7th Avenues surround a portion of the town in what seems like an almost rectangular road network which are connected and accessible through each other. The 3rd and 5th avenues run parallel within the town. The 6th avenue is found in a portion of the town accessible through a bridge from the 1st Avenue. The town consists of cul-de-sacs or closes which are named in an alphabetical format.

Festac town is accessible from the Lagos-Badagry Expressway through three main gates that open into the 1st, 2nd and 7th avenues and are called the First, Second and Third gates respectively. The town is also accessible through the Festac Link Bridge.

== Status ==
The status of FESTAC Town is somewhat confusing as the Federal, State and Local Government all lay claim to the management of the estate and occasionally issue the residents with various charges ranging from valuation fees, local government levies to tenement rates.

== Commercial and Leisure Activities ==
Once an estate, FESTAC Town has in the past few years attracted varied forms of businesses within the estate and its environs. Today, there is a growing number of commercial banks, and shopping complexes that cater to the residents. There are also several hotels and hangout spots within the estate which have contributed to the night life.
