= First Christian Missionary Cemetery in Nigeria =

Historical landmark in Nigeria

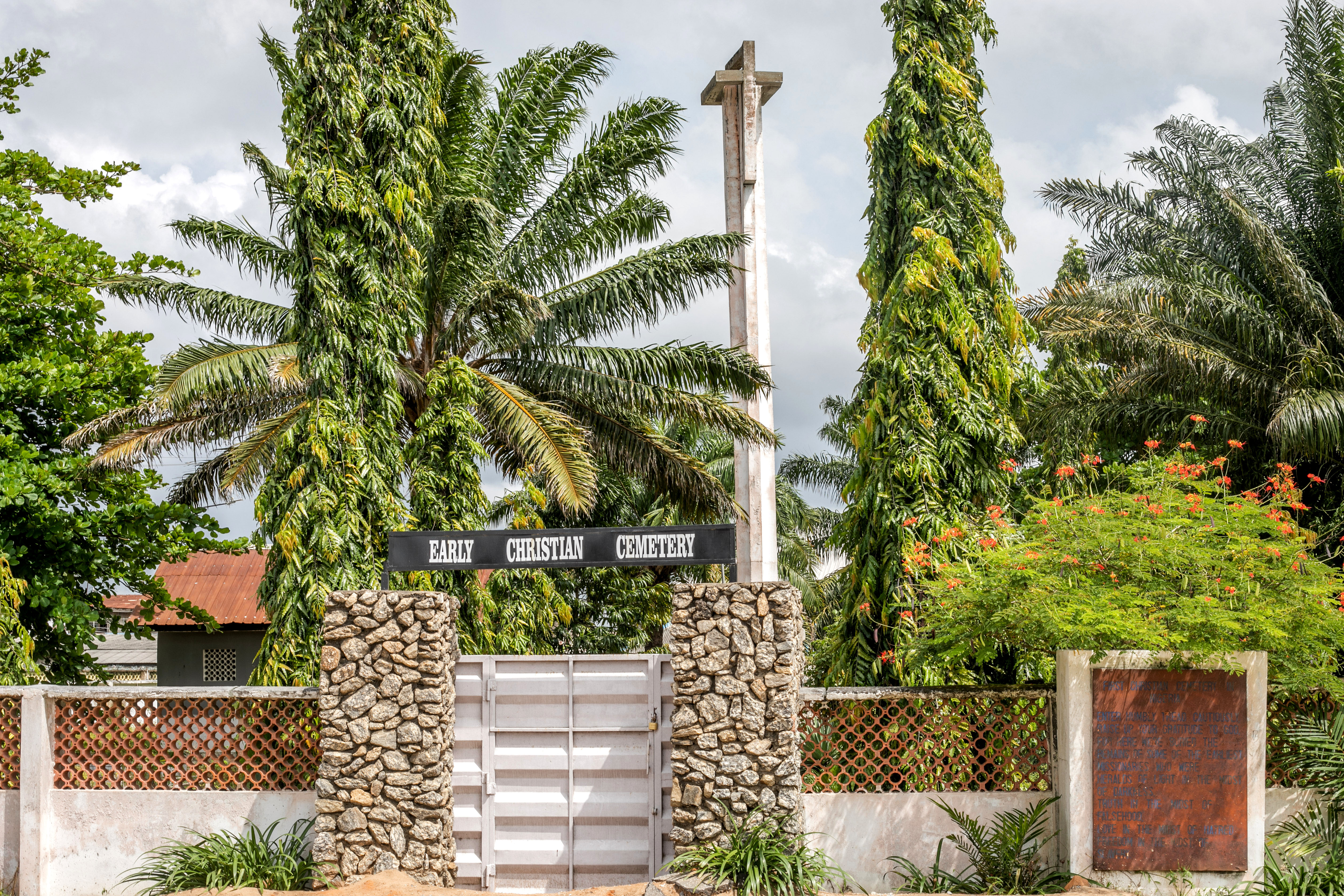

Details
- Location: Badagry town, Lagos.
- Country: Nigeria
- No. of interments: around 200,000

The First Christian Missionary Cemetery in Nigeria, also known as the Early Christian Missionary Cemetery in Badagry, is a graveyard where 19th- and 20th-century European Christian Missionaries who died in Badagry town and its environs were buried. The burial site in located along the town's General Hospital Road. It's Plus Code coordinates on Google Maps are CV7Q+CPR, 103101, Badagry, Nigeria. Some records say that over 200 missionaries were buried here. An obelisk was erected in memory of the dead missionaries. Today, the cemetery is one of the historical sites that attract tourists into Badagry town.

== History ==
Many Europeans died in different parts of Africa during the era of the European enslavement of Africans, the era of Christian missions, and the colonial era on the continent. Many of these Europeans died from malaria and different kinds of tropical fevers against which most of them had no natural immunity and for which there was no efficient medicine at the time. It was much later that quinine was discovered to fight malaria. This is the context in which several European Christian Missionaries that moved to Badagry town beginning in 1845 died and were buried in the town.

It was shortly after the arrival of the first European missionaries in Badagry that the first death was recorded among them. Mrs. Eliza Phillips Gollmer, wife of one of the leaders of the mission, Rev. Charles Andrew Gollmer (who he married after the demise of his first wife earlier in Sierra Leone in similar circumstances), was the first in the long list of missionary deaths and/or burials in Badagry that would follow. Mrs. Gollmer died on April 11, 1845, after a serious three-month-long bout of severe illness. It was upon her interment at this site that the missionary cemetery was established.

Other European missionaries who died and were buried here include Mrs. Müller, wife of Rev. J. C. Müller who passed on February 26, 1848; and Eugene Celadon Van Cooten (a Dutch surgeon) and his wife, Emily Primrose Van Cooten, who died from a serious episode of fever on March 13, 1851, and May 17, 1850, respectively.

There were also other Europeans who, though not missionaries, were buried in this cemetery. An example is Mr. George Brand, a British Consul at colonial Lagos who died of dysentery and fever on June 16, 1860. Some African missionaries were also buried there, such as Mr. Edward Philips, a Sierra Leonian mission teacher who died from epileptic seizures on March 13, 1847. There was also Mr. Mark Willoughby, Gollmer's Sierra Leonian interpreter, who died on May 9, 1850, after a lengthened illness. In recent decades, a few Nigerian contemporary clergies, particularly of the Anglican and Methodist denomination, have also been interred in this cemetery. The Catholic missions and its Society of African Missions in the town had a separate burial site on Topo Island where their mission was largely based.

== Photo gallery ==
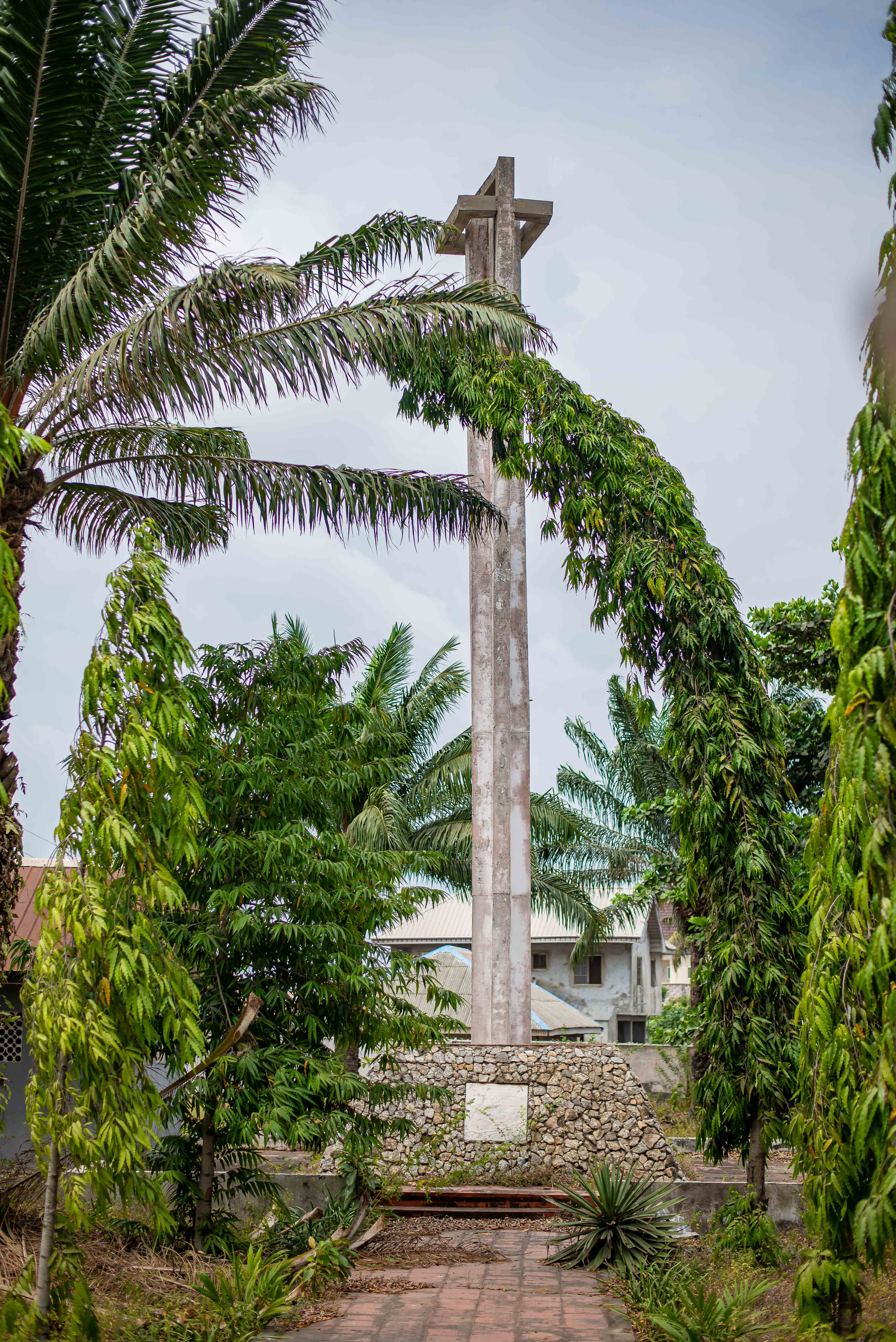
File:Early_Missionaries_Cemetery_Badagry._42.jpg

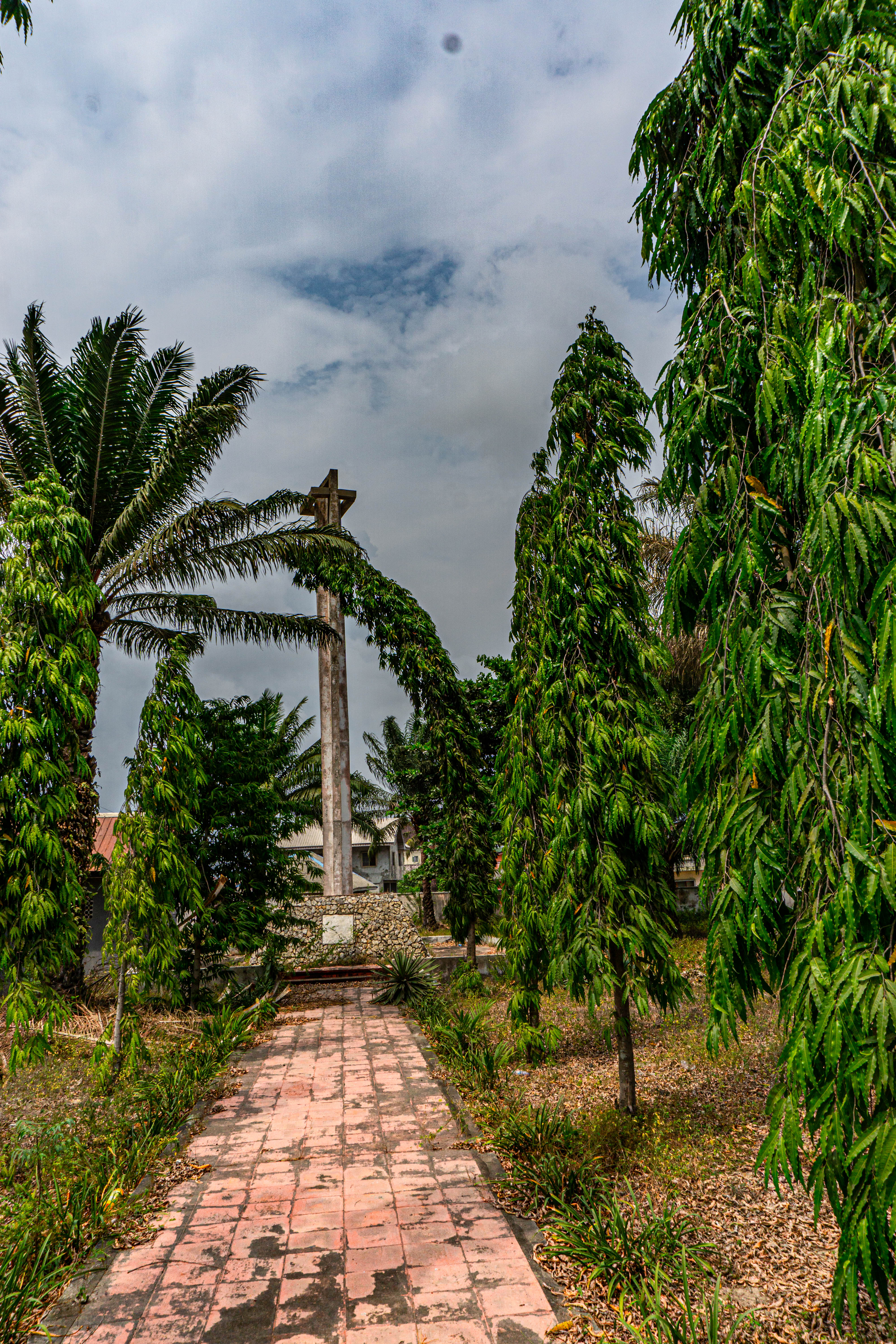
File:First_Cemetery.jpg

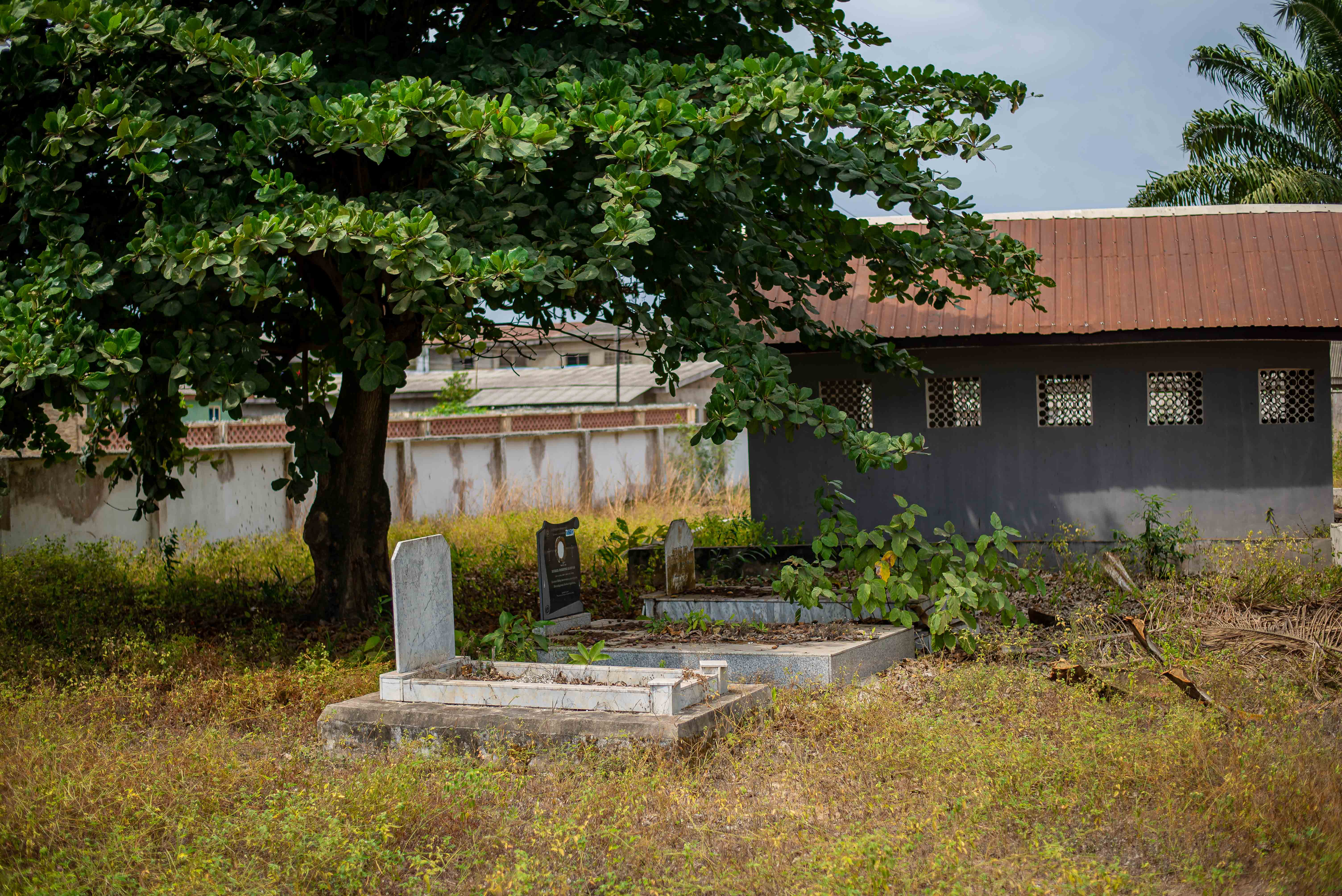
File:Early_Missionaries_Cemetery_Badagry_41.jpg

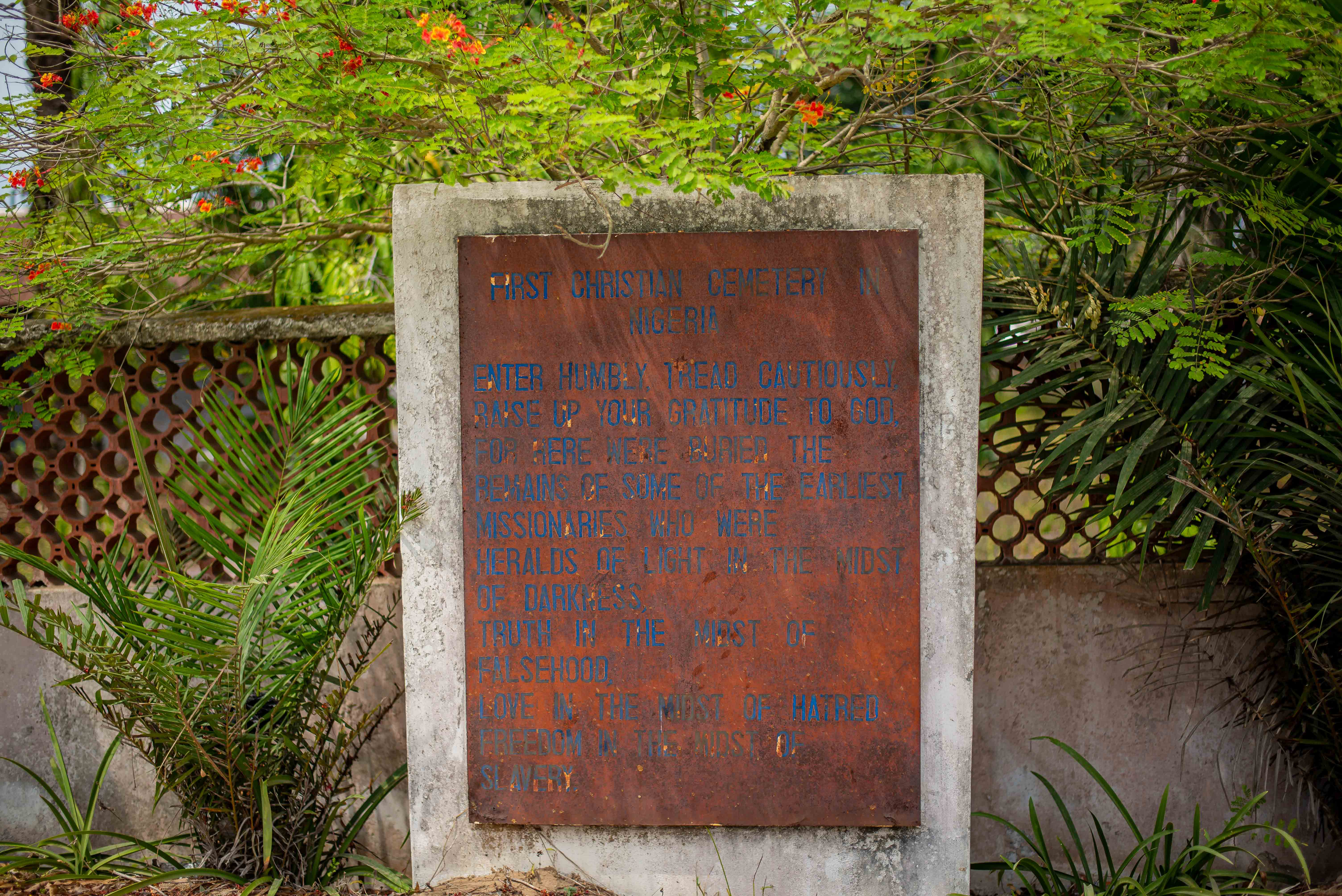
File:Early_Missionaries_Cemetery_Badagry._39.jpg

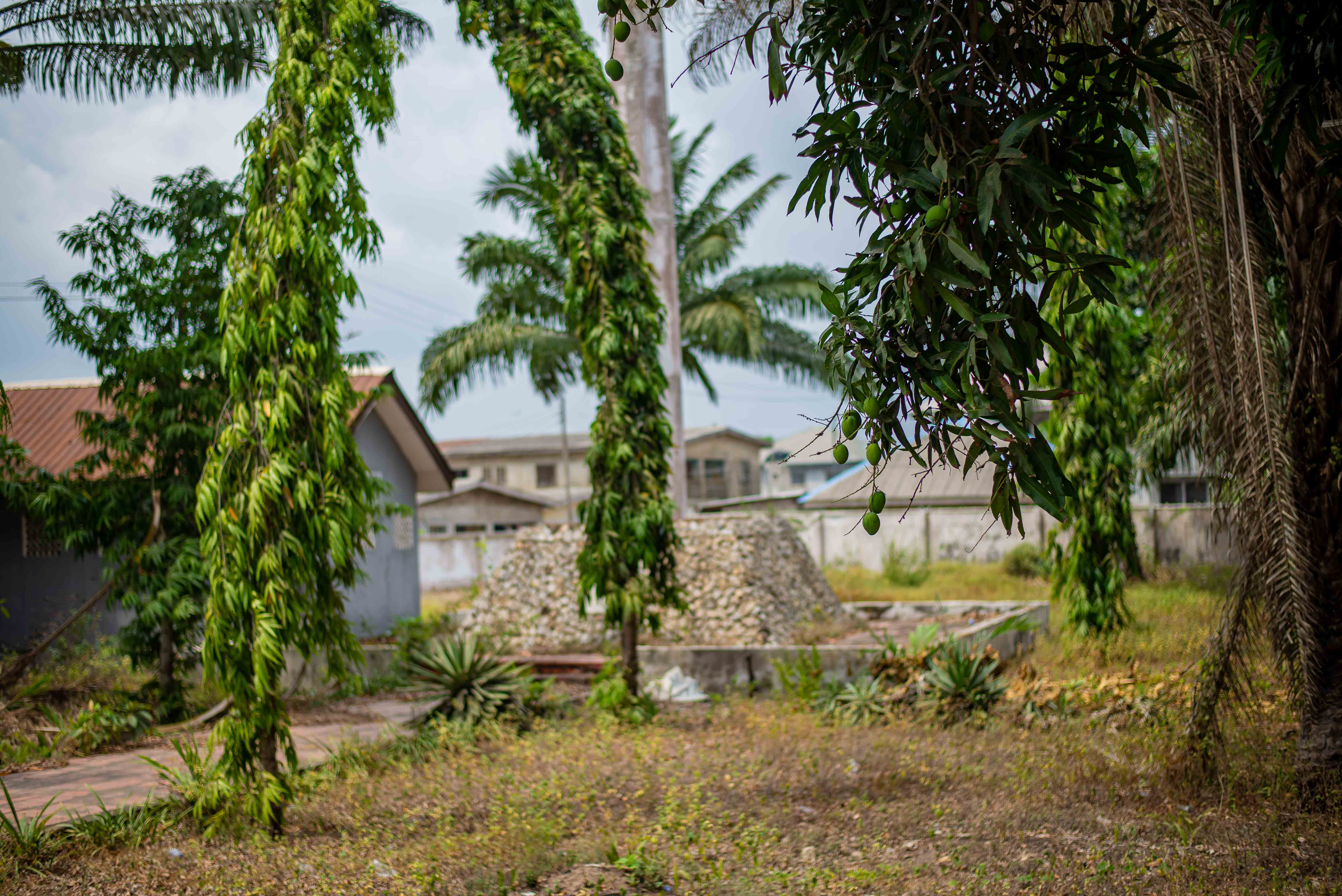
File:Early_Missionaries_Cemetery_Badagry._40.jpg

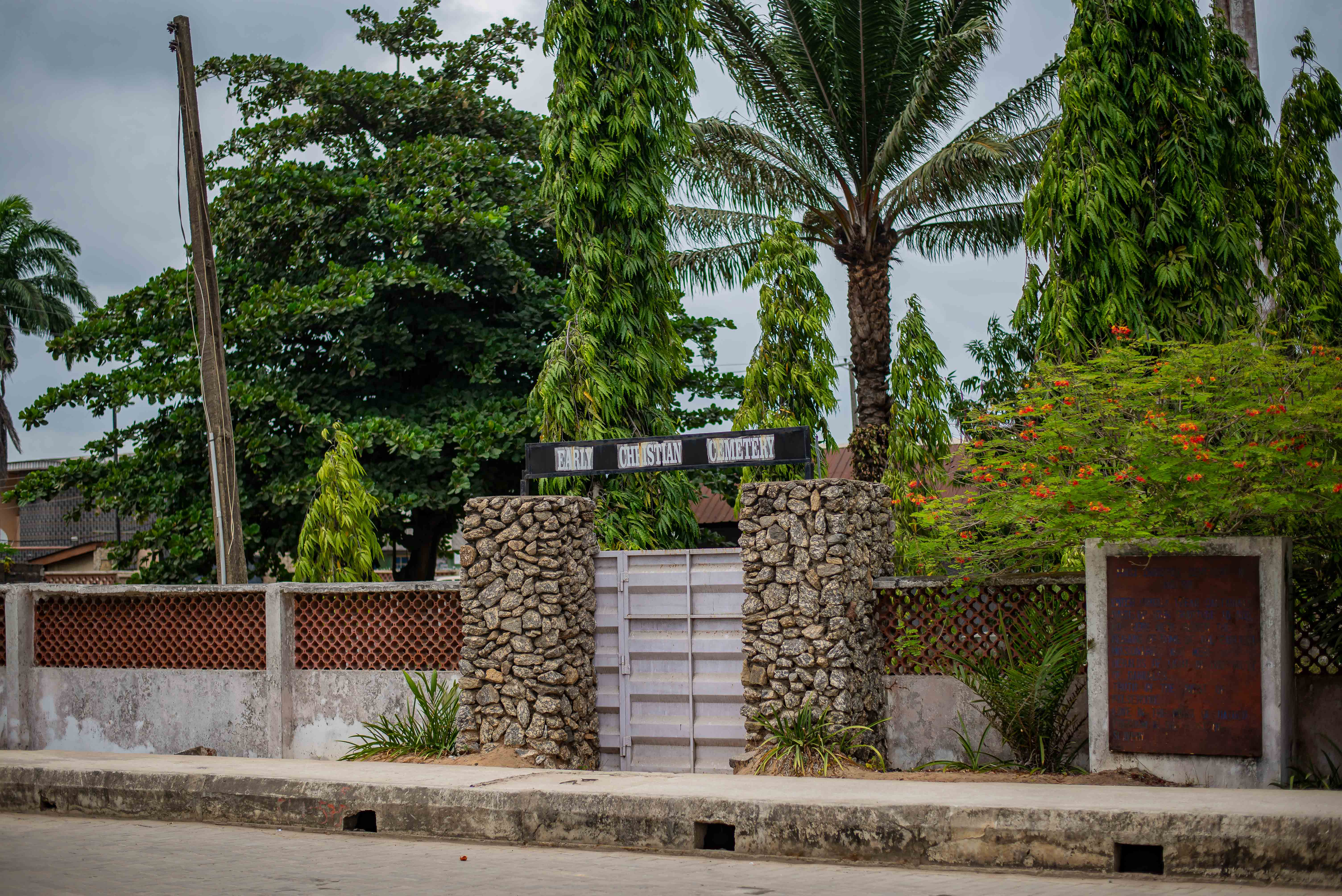
File:Early_Missionaries_Cemetery_Badagry._36.jpg
