= Oto-Awori =

Historical settlement in Lagos State, Nigeria founded by Aregi Ope

- Local Council Development Area and town
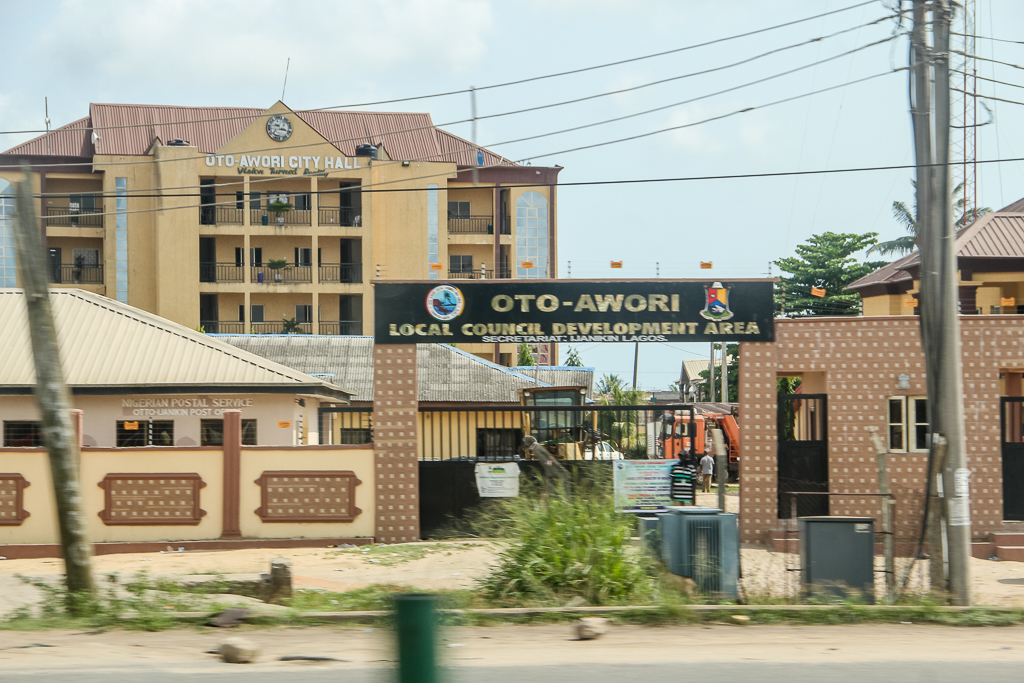

- Location of Oto-Awori in Nigeria
- Coordinates: 6°26′40.848″N 3°24′43.47″E
- Country: Nigeria
- State: Lagos State
- Time zone: UTC+1 (WAT)
- ZIP: 102101
- Website: otoawori.com.ng

Oto (often referred to as Oto-Awori) is a historical settlement in the Badagry Division of Lagos State, Nigeria. Positioned along the Olooge Lagoon, it is a prominent community within the Awori ethnic group. The town’s history is defined by its migration from the Kingdom of Benin and its formal recognition during the British colonial era.

== History ==
=== Origins and founding (18th Century) ===
The founding of Oto is documented in the 1939 Intelligence Report by colonial officer R.J. Curwen. According to these archival records, the settlement was established in the 18th century by migrants from the Kingdom of Benin. The migration was led by Aregi Ope, alongside his brothers Iworu Oloja and Odofin.

The founders brought with them the Abeere (a ceremonial flat sword), a symbol of sovereign authority derived from Benin political tradition. This artifact established the political legitimacy of the ruling line, integrating the Oloto (the traditional ruler of Oto) into the Akarigbere (White-cap Chiefs) class of the traditional Lagos hierarchy.

=== Etymology ===
The settlement was originally known as Ijake. Following a land division at Igbo-Ogo, which established the boundary between the town and neighboring Iba, the settlement was renamed Oto. In the local dialect, Oto signifies "The Different Place," marking the community’s independent identity following the separation of the founding brothers from other groups.

=== Colonial recognition (1866) ===
A significant event in the town's documented history occurred in 1866 during a visit by the British Administrator of Lagos, John Hawley Glover. After a period of instability caused by the Egba raids, Glover visited the community to formalize administrative relations.

During this visit, the town’s elders selected Olumidu Bala as the monarch. Governor Glover presented the ruler with a Staff of Office, traditional regalia, and a formal record of the town’s history. This act solidified Oto’s status as a recognized political entity within the Lagos colonial administration.

== See also ==
- History of Lagos
- Awori District settlements
