= Pépé Oléka =

Beninese artist and singer-songwriter

- Espérance Oléka
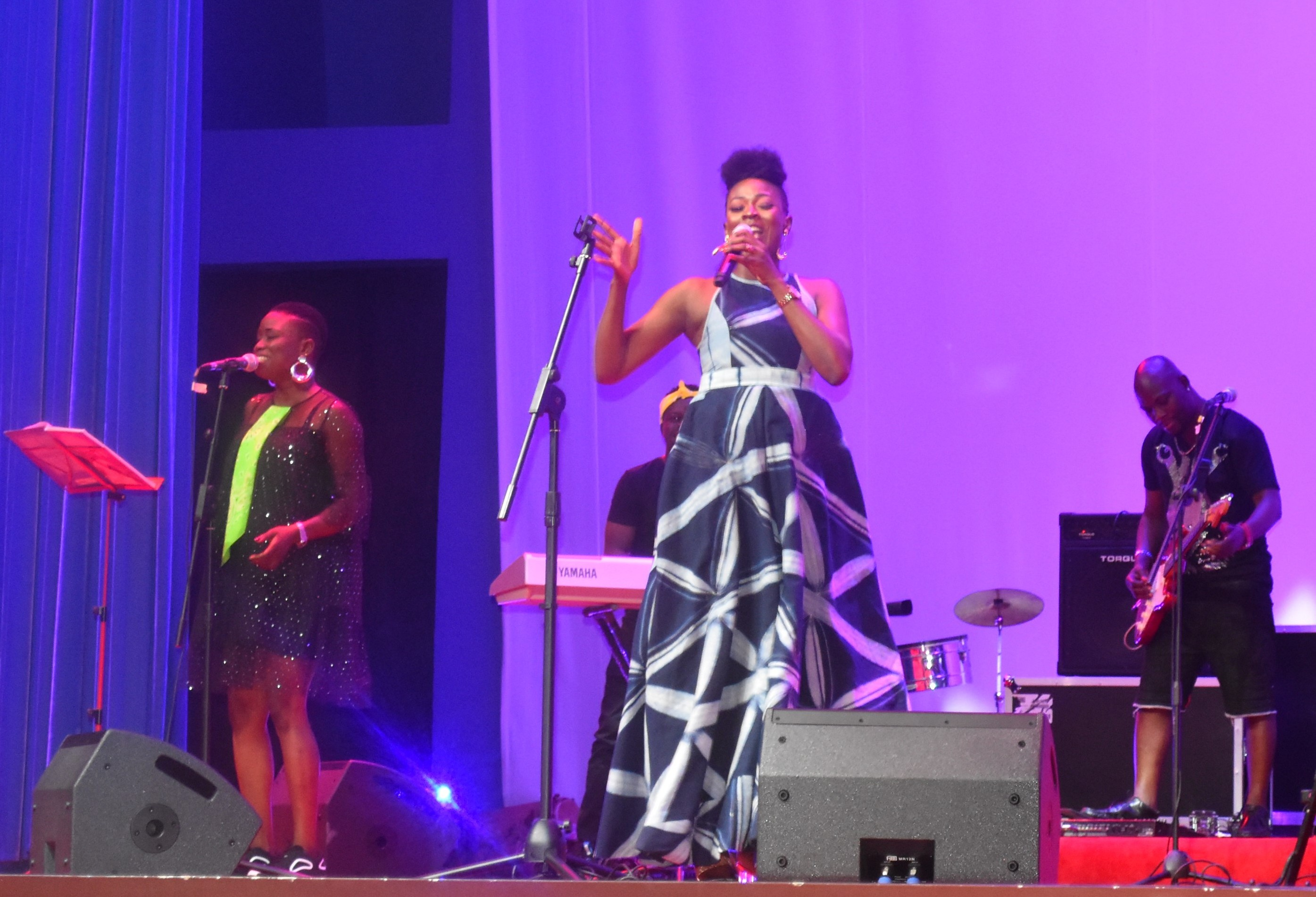
- Born: Badagry

Pépé Oléka, whose real name is Espérance Oléka, born in Badagry, Nigeria, is a Beninese artist, singer-songwriter, and singer.

== Biography ==
=== Childhood, education, and beginnings ===
Pépé Oléka was born Espérance Oléka in Badagry, Nigeria. Naturalized Beninese in 2000, Pépé Oléka grew up in Togo, spending four years of her childhood with her two parents, including her Beninese mother who was fond of country music and a Nigerian father who was a fan of Bob Marley.

She learned music at a young age from Vodoun ritual chants, the liturgies at Sunday Mass, ''Agbadja'' music played during the monthly gatherings of women in Lomé, and the songs of Billie Holiday or Miriam Makeba she heard on a specialized program on Saturday evenings on the ORTB national radio.

== Career ==
She lived in the 1990s with her mother in Lomé, and she began her singing career in Kodjoviakopé.

In 1996, Pépé Oléka returned to Benin and met pianist André Quenum, director of the Musigerme studio in Cotonou. She participated as a backing singer on numerous albums of local artists, including the grand orchestra Poly-rythmo du Bénin, Afia Mala, the group Fâ, the group Jawa, Tchalé, Jean Adagbenon, Max-Lolo.

Later in Cotonou, she became a member of the group Traffic. Resident in Marseille in 2004[4], she participated in different musical and cinematic projects, including studio work for her first album project entitled Tchité.

She is also known for her numerous covers, notably Sêbla Koko by Adjovi Guy in 2020, Kpee Beeri from the first album of the late Beninese singer Zouley Sangaré in tribute to her, and many others.

In 2021, she released, in collaboration with the Beninese singer Vi-Phint, a music video celebrating love entitled N’lonwébi. The music festival scene in Benin witnessed her presence that same year.

In 2022, her portrait was created by two young visual artists at the Artistic and Cultural Return of Students of the Cultural and Artistic Union of Students (UCAE) of the University of Abomey-Calavi. She then visited UCAE on April 22, 2022.

Pépé Oléka states: "I am the product of Nigerian, Beninese, and Togolese cultures."
