= First Storey Building in Nigeria =

1842/45 building in Lagos State, Nigeria

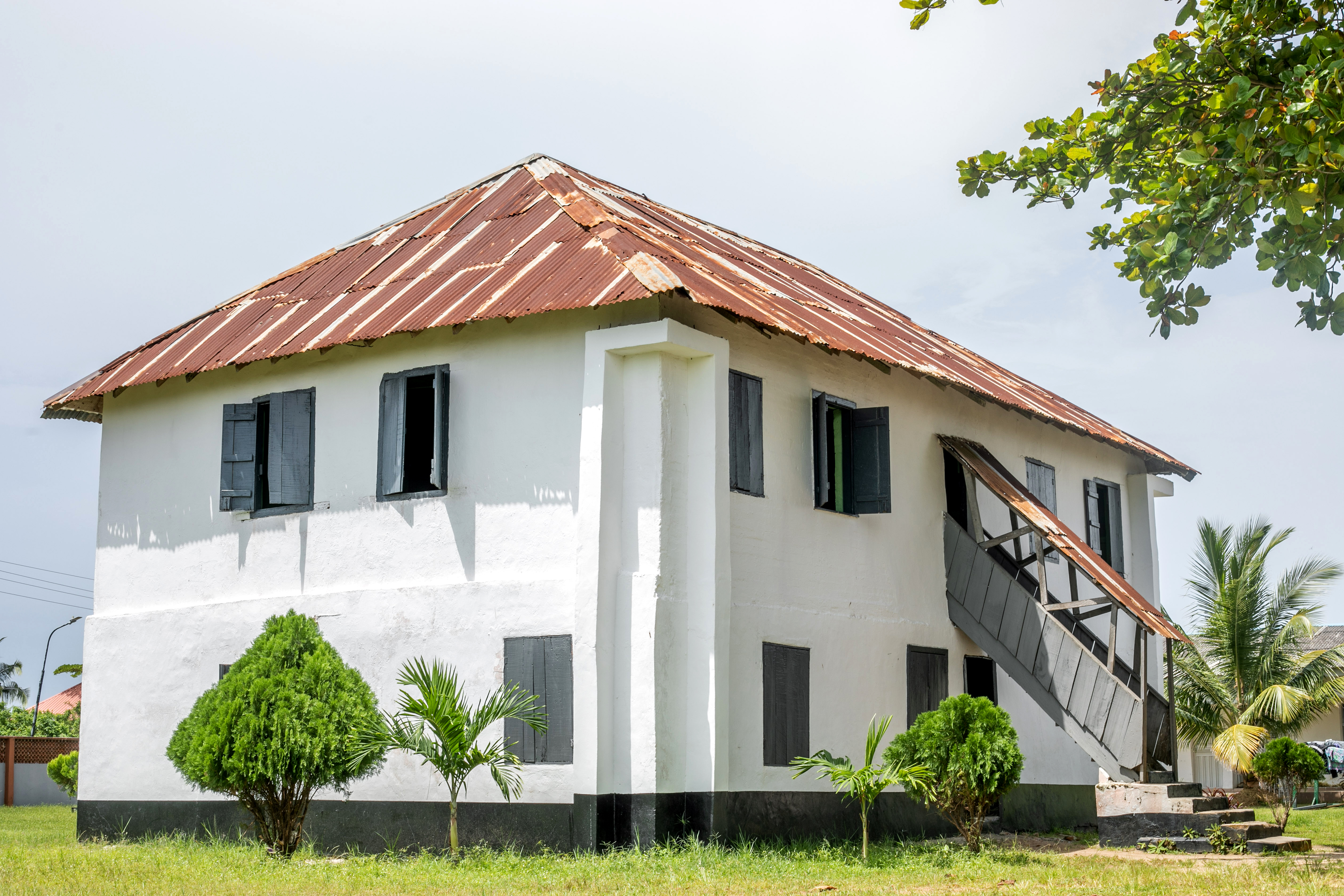
The First Western-Style Storey Building in Nigeria

The first western-style storey building in Nigeria was built by the early missionaries of the Church Missionary Society (CMS) between 1842 and 1845. It is one of the tourism sites in Badagry.
