= Mowo, Badagry =

Mowo
- Town
- Location within Nigeria
- Coordinates: 6°27′21″N 2°58′24″E
- Country: Nigeria
- State: Lagos State
- LGA: Badagry
- Time zone: UTC+1 (WAT)

Mowo is a town in Badagry, Lagos State, southwestern Nigeria. The town is just few kilometres from Seme Border with a populations of about 78,897. Resident of the town are predominantly traders who often do businesses in the Seme border. In December 2013, it was reported that 600 buildings erected on about 65 hectares (160 acres) of land were demolished by the Nigerian police.

== Gallery ==
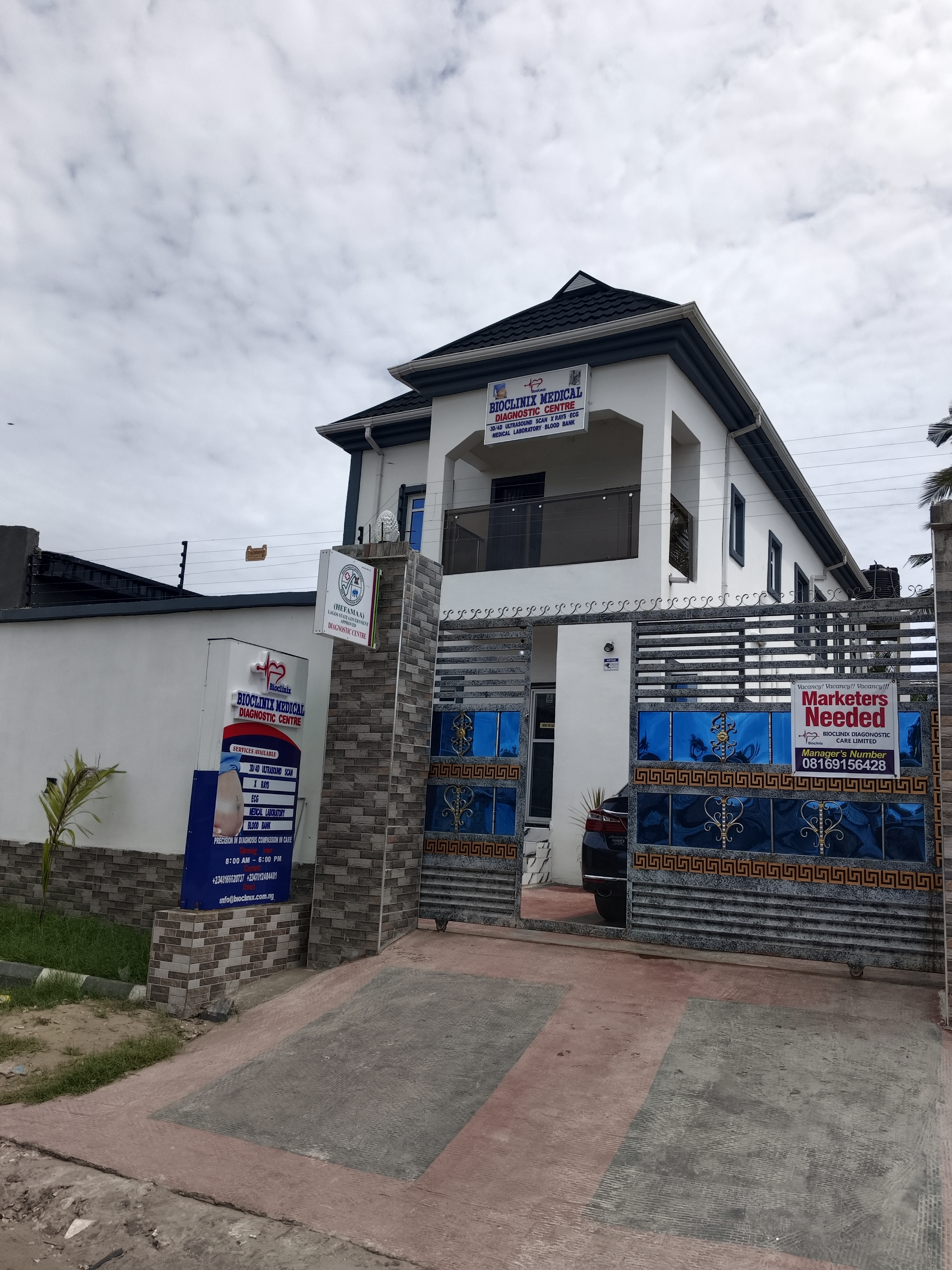
Bioclinix Medical Diagnostics Centre, Mowo

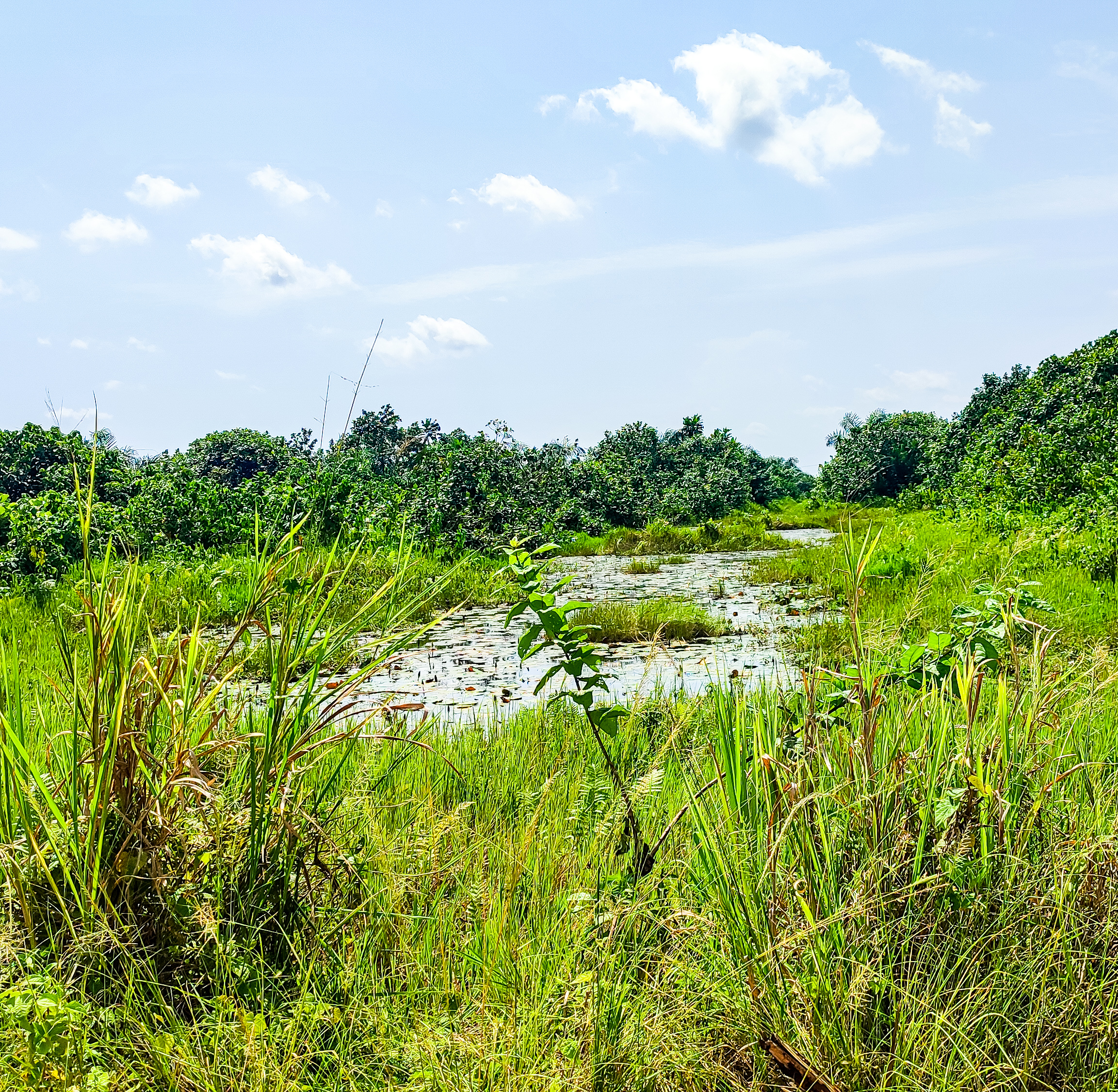
Swamp site in Mowo, Badagry
