= Eugene Celadon Van Cooten =

Dutch surgeon and missionary

Dr. Eugene Celadon van Cooten
- Born: 1820
- Died: 1851 (aged 30–31)
- Education: Islington Institution
- Medical career
- Profession: doctor, surgeon, medical missionary, missionary

Eugene C. Van Cooten (1820-1851) was a Dutch surgeon and missionary. He worked at Islington College, a part of the Church Missionary Society College, Islington in London and traveled to the Badagry mission in Nigeria in March 1850. He was among the first missionaries to work at the Yoruba mission in Badagry within the Church Missionary Society. He served from 1850 to 1851. Along with classmates, E. G. Irving and A. A. Harrison, they sacrificed their lives for their missionary work. He died in 1851.

== Early life ==
Van Cooten was born in 1820 to physician John Christopher Mathew Van Cooten and merchant's daughter Martha Keane Smithers. He had five siblings: Rosalie, Hendrik, Sydney, Maria and John. Eugene was the youngest. His mother left the family when he was a baby, but Eugene eventually got in touch with her again. In an 1846 letter to the Church Missionary Society, he described his mother's whereabouts and how her brother supported her.

Van Cooten attended Church Missionary Society Training College in London from 1847, also known as the Islington College or the Inslington Institution.

== Mission ==
Van Cooten was known for his Christian character and desire to help others. He felt a call to serve after talking to Emily Primrose, a young lady from Suffolk, England, whose sister was under his care.

He married Emily at the Church of England in Ipswick, Suffolk, London on October 11, 1849. He traveled to Badagry, Yoruba, Nigeria with Emily, Mr. and Mrs. Gollmer, Mr. and Mrs. Townsend, and Mr. and Mrs. Huber in March 1850.

The Yoruba mission was founded in 1844 when Samuel Crowther, Mr. Gollmer, and Rev. Henry Townsend were travelling to Abeokuta. On their journey, they received news that the individual who would welcome them to the Abeokuta mission had passed. Thus the party stayed in Badagry, where they eventually established a mission. Mr. Gollmer remained with the Badagry mission.

== Legacy ==
Van Cooten came to the mission in January 1850 with Emily and eight other missionaries. He traveled to neighboring towns, such as Okpa and Ilassa, to preach. He died in March 1851 after battling a fever while visiting the lands between Ossa and Porto Novo. He was brought back to Badagry by canoe, where he died a few days later. Van Cooten is remembered as a sincere, incredibly devoted individual, who gave his time and efforts to spreading the Gospel.

== Bibliography ==
- Church Missionary Society. "Chapter VII: Forty Years Ago." One Hundred Years: Being the Short History of the Church Missionary Society, 3rd ed., Church Missionary Society, 1899, pp. 85.
- Stock, Eugene. "Three Missions and Three Bishops ." The History of the Church Missionary Society: Its Environment, Its Men and Its Work, Church Missionary Soc., 1899, p. 117.
- Schram, Ralph. "The Missionary Movement in the West ." A History of the Nigerian Health Services with an Introduction by Sir Samuel Manuwa, Ibadan University Press, 1971, pp. 59–78.
- "Van Cooten Voices." Eugene Celadon Van Cooten b. Abt 1820 d. 13 Mar 1851 Badagry, Yoruba, Nigeria: Van Cooten Genealogy.
- Church Missionary Society. Accession 765: Papers of Eugene Van Cooten. University of Birmingham Cadbury Research Library Special Collections.
- Church Missionary Gleaner. "Badagry." The Chinese and General Missionary Gleaner, Volumes 1-2, Dec. 1851, pp. 54–55.
- "The Missionary Register ." The Missionary Register , vol. 39, Seeley, Jackson, & Halliday, 1851, p. 471-77.
- Tucker, Miss. "Abbeokuta: or, Sunrise within the Tropics: an Outline of the Origin and Progress of the Yoruba Mission." Abbeokuta: or, Sunrise within the Tropics: an Outline of the Origin and Progress of the Yoruba Mission, 1853, pp. 264–266.
- "Van Cooten Voices." Van Cooten Family History - Marthe Keane Smithers.
