= Badagry =

LGA in Lagos state

Badagry (Àgbádárìgì)
- City and LGA
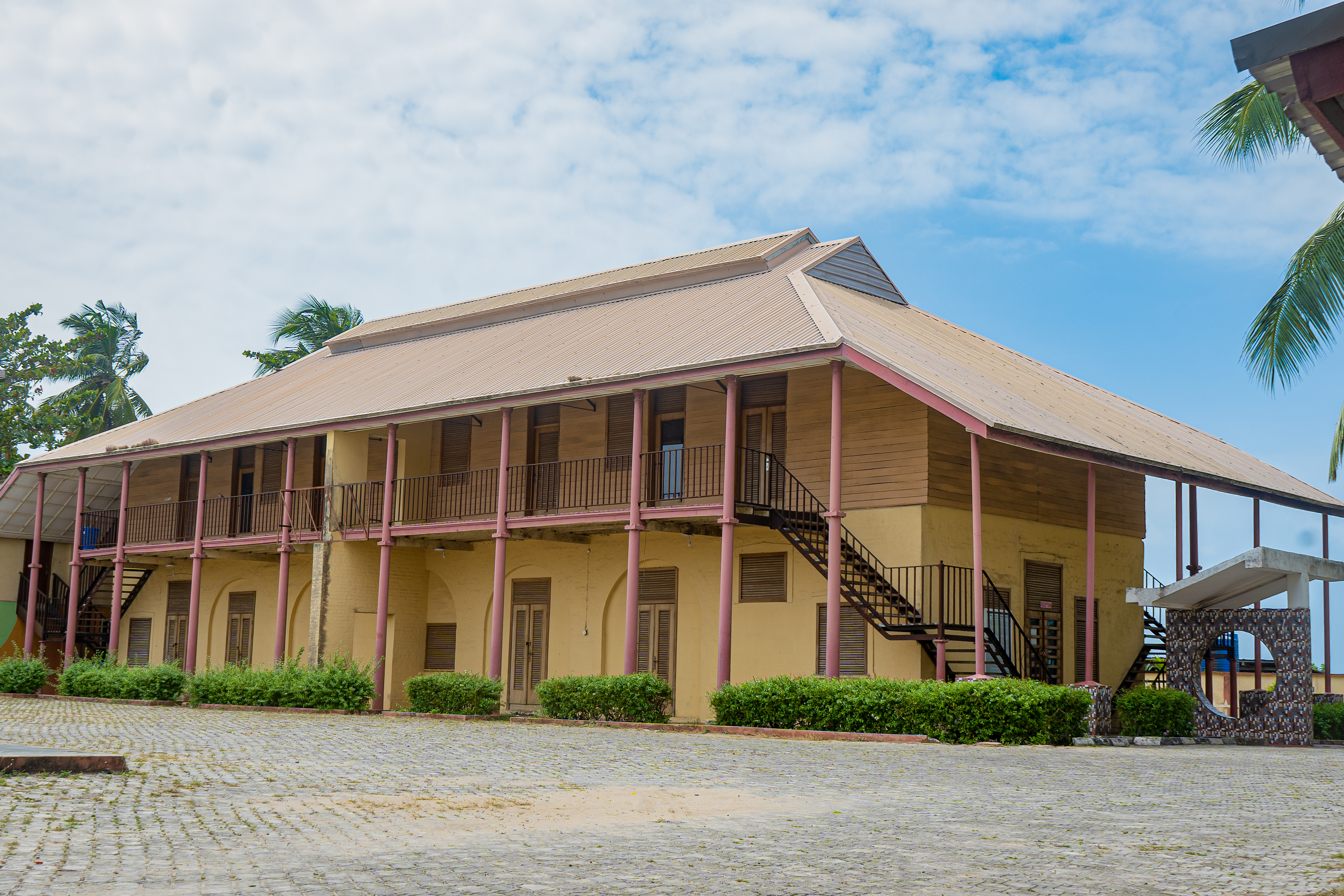
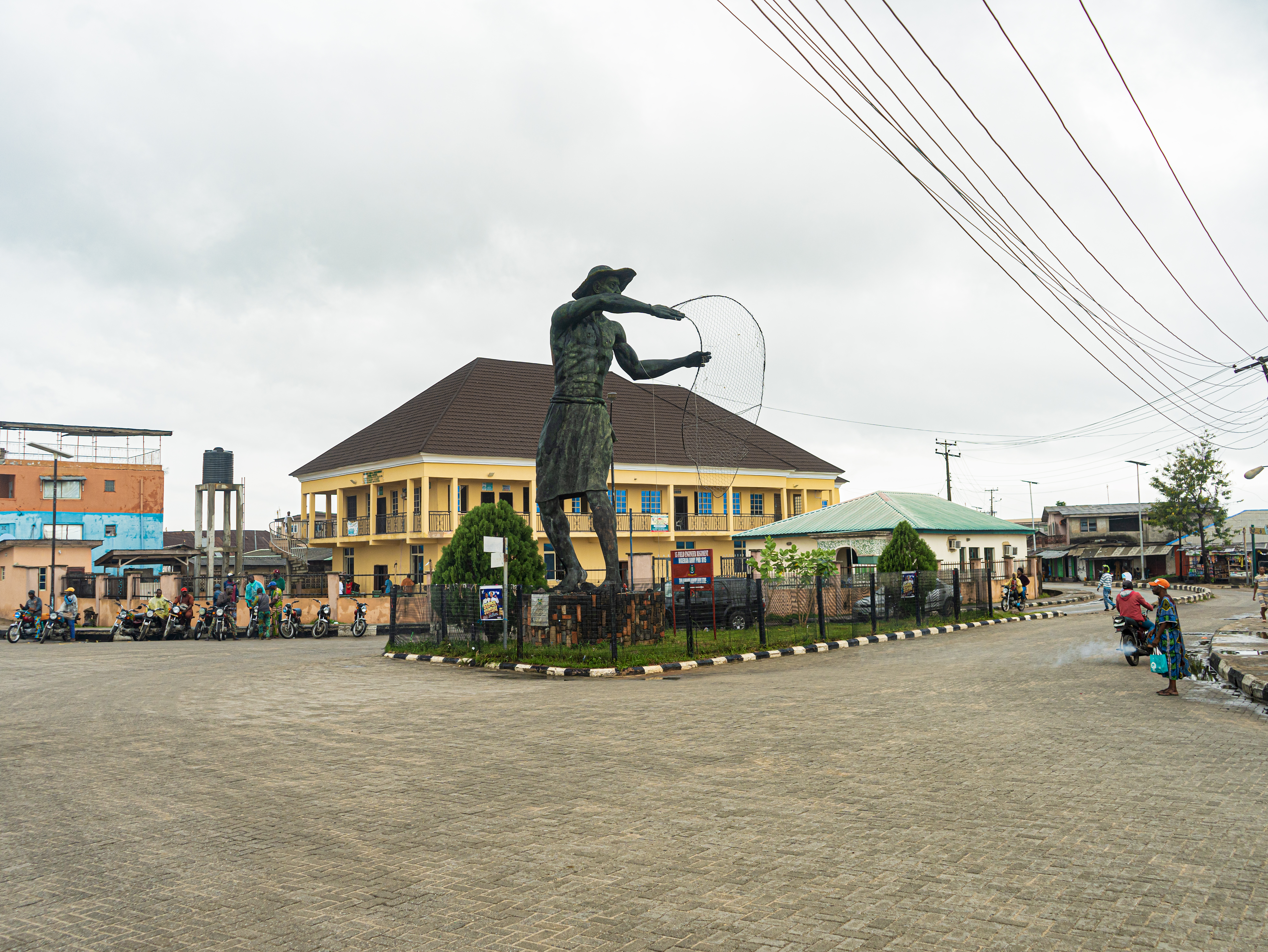
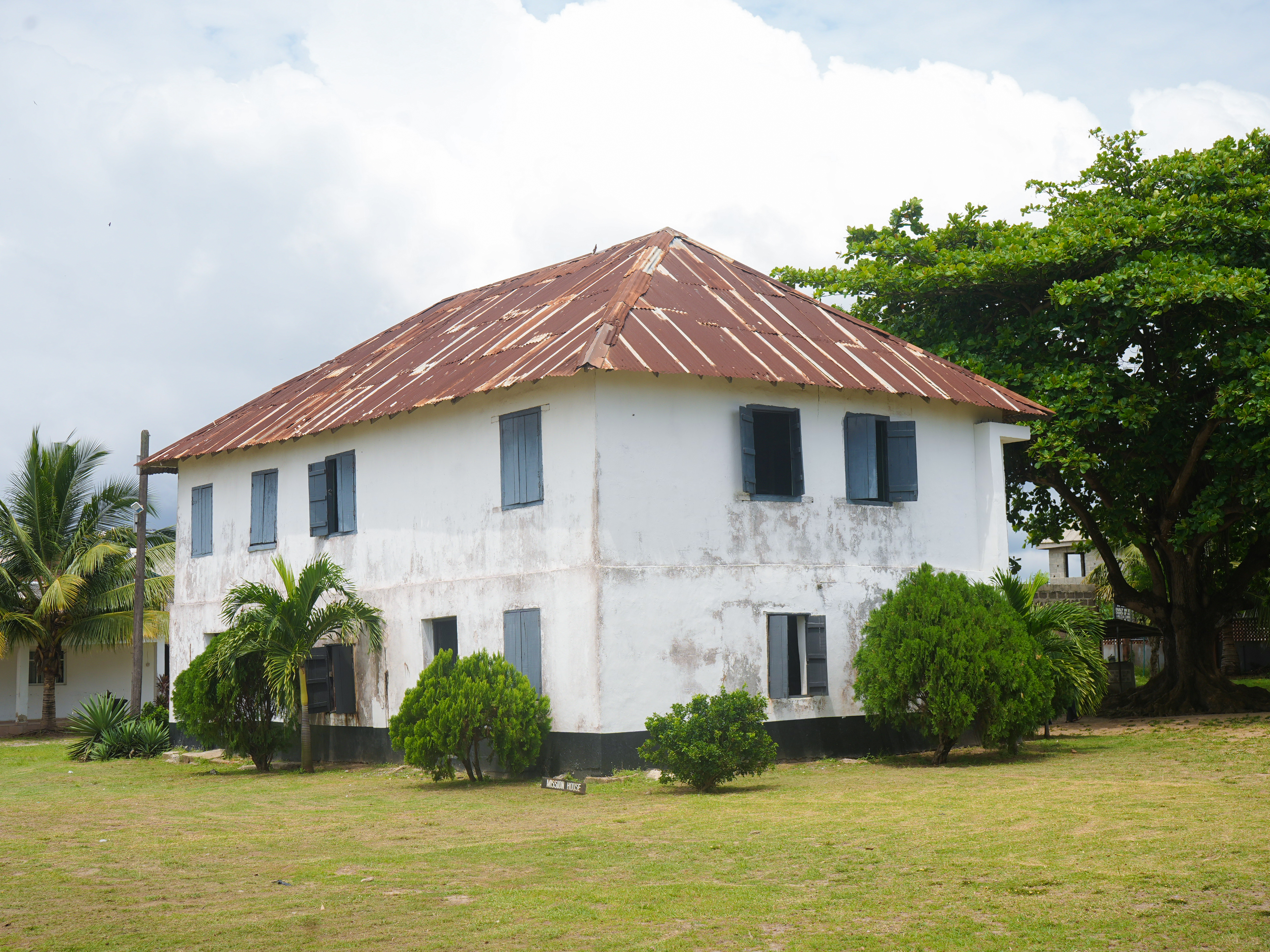
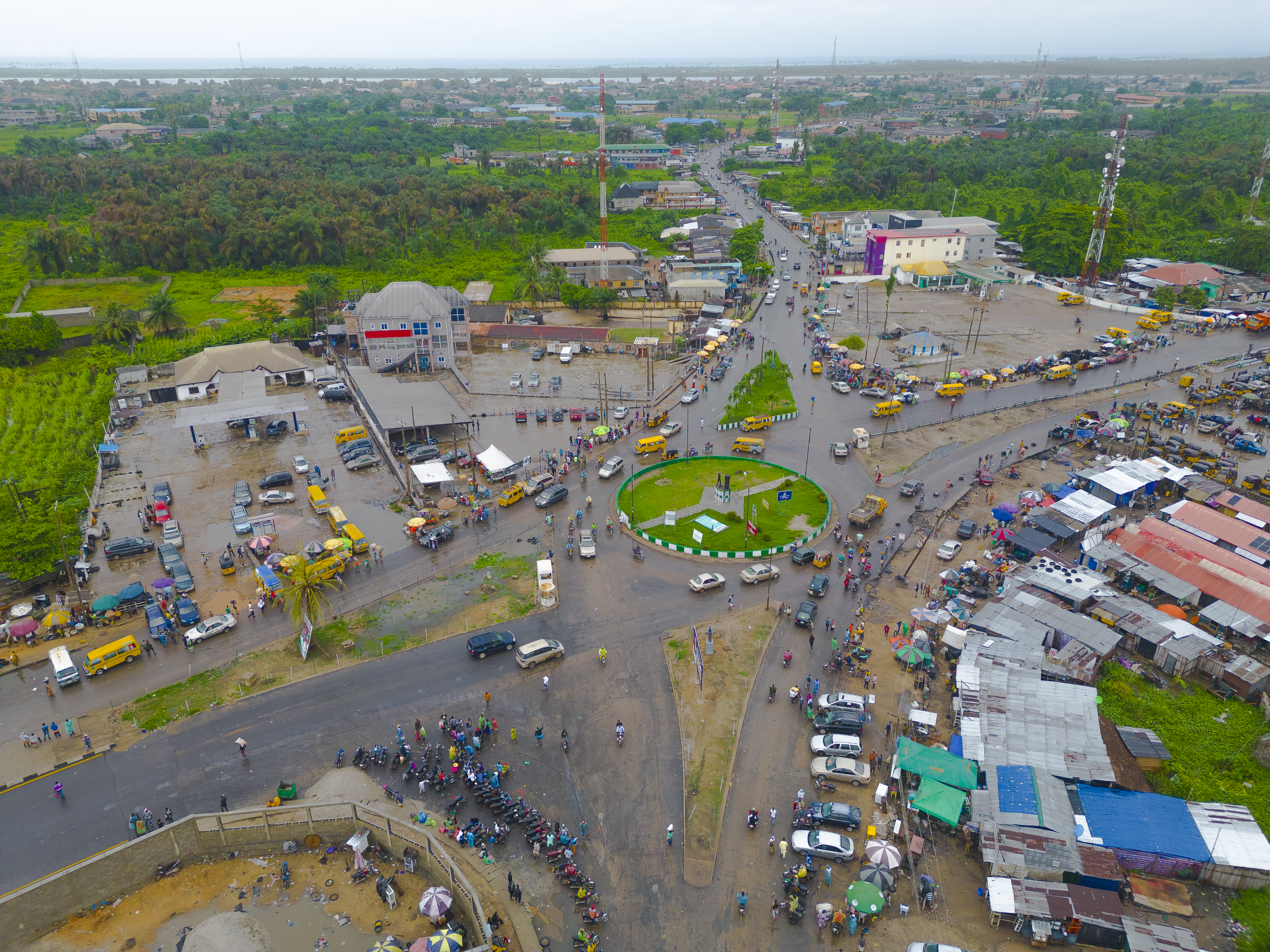
- Motto(s): Together in progress Clockwise from top: Badagry Heritage Museum; First storey Building; Badagry Roundabout; Fisherman Statue.

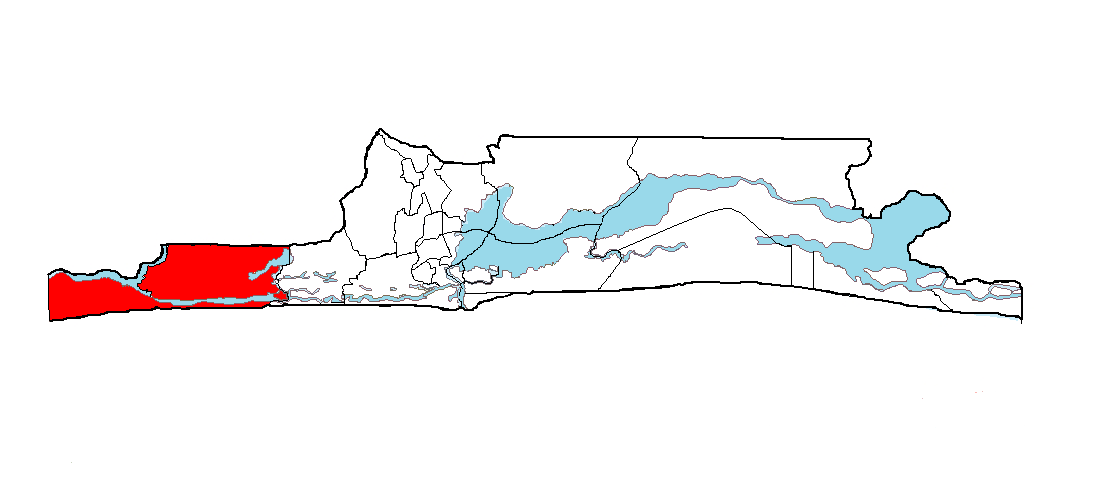
- Badagry shown within the State of Lagos
- Interactive map of Badagry
- Location of Badagry in Nigeria
- Coordinates: 6°25′N 2°53′E
- Country: Nigeria
- State: Lagos State

Area
  - Total: 441 km^{2} (170 sq mi)

Population (2006)
  - Total: 241,093
  - Density: 547/km^{2} (1,420/sq mi)
- Time zone: UTC+1 (WAT)
- National language: Yorùbá, Gungbe
- Website: www.badagrygov.org

Badagry, also spelled Badagri, (Gun: Gbagli) is a coastal city and Local Government Area (LGA) in the Badagry Division of Lagos State, Nigeria. It is quite close to the city of Lagos, and located on the north bank of Porto Novo Creek, an inland waterway that connects Lagos (Nigeria's largest city and economic capital) to the Beninese capital of Porto-Novo. The same route connects Lagos, Ilaro, and Porto-Novo, and shares a border with the Republic of Benin. As of the preliminary 2006 census results, the municipality had a population of 241,093.

Serving as a lagoon and an Atlantic port, Badagry emerged as a commercial center on the West African coast between 1736 and 1851. Its connecting and navigable lakes, creeks and inland lagoons acted as a means to facilitate trade and as a security bar for residents. During the Trans-Atlantic slave trade, the town was a middleman between European traders on the coast and traders from the hinterland.

== Geography ==
Badagry is situated on the south-west coast of Nigeria, bordered by the Gulf of Guinea to the south. It is located 43 miles (69 km) southwest of Lagos and 14 miles (23 km) east of Seme, a border town in Benin Republic. Like Lagos Island, it is on the bank of inland lagoons, a system of creeks, waterways that are navigable to Lagos and Porto Novo. The distance between the lagoon and the ocean varies along the coast, in Badagry, the distance is about a mile. The depth of the lagoon varies according to the season, from highs of 3 metres (9.8 feet) to lows of a 1 metre (3.3 feet). The lagoons have a diverse fish population that includes bonga, croaker, longfin pompano, tilapia and catfish. The lagoon consists of brackish and freshwater with seasonal variability; west of Badagry, Yewa River provides water inflow to the lagoon.

=== Climate ===
In Badagry, the wet season is overcast, the dry season is partly cloudy, and it is oppressive and hot year round. Precipitation occurs on roughly 90 days per year (1,429 millimetres [56.3 inches] total) and the averagewind speed is 3.2 metres per second (10 feet per second; 7.2 miles per hour).

== History ==
There is a traditional Yoruba narrative that the first settlement within the area was an Awori group originally from Ile-Ife who lived at a nearby settlement. Robin Law, a scholar of West African history, notes an origin that sprouted out of a resettlement for displaced peoples of varied ethnic groups, mostly Ogu people, Ewe people and Oyo Yorubas. Another source links the people living at a settlement called Gberefu as the Ewe's of Oyo, an island along the Atlantic coast.

One of the recorded notable events in the history of Badagry was the acquisition of land by a European trader who was locally known as Yovo Huntɔkonu. Yovo or Yevu means a white person in Gbe languages. Many sources identify the European to be a Dutch trader called Hendrik Hertogh. Huntɔkonu meaning(laughing or smiling priest)arrived from the west, settling in the area after fleeing the wrath of an African chief. He reached the settlement called Apa under the Obaship of Alapa and he was given farmland to use for trading.

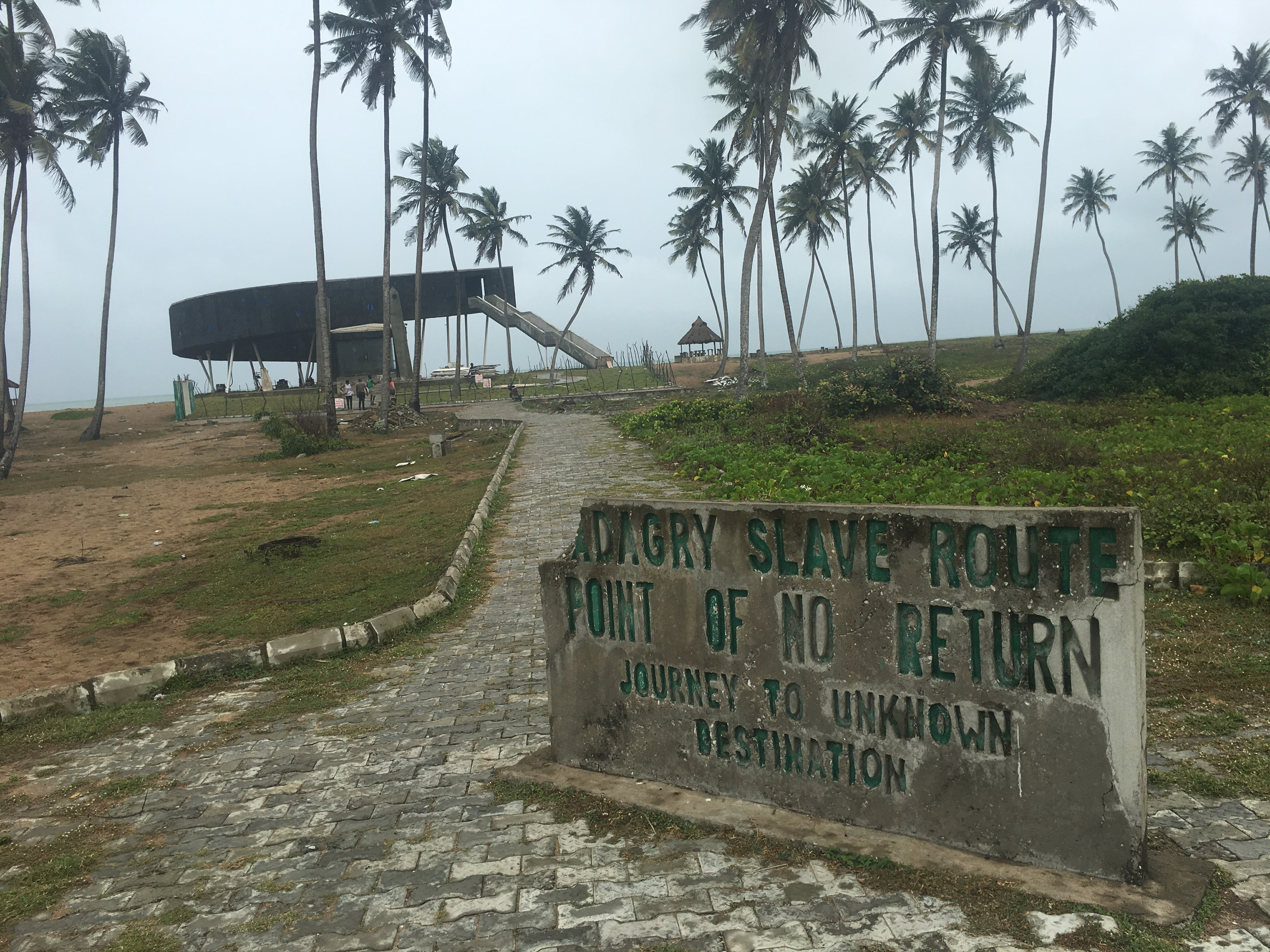
Point of No Return, Gberefu Island

The name Badagry was said to be derived from the city's indigenes' methods of subsistence, which include fishing, farming, and salt production. Others think the city was called after Agbede (blacksmith in Yoruba and Gbe languages)a well-known farmer whose okra farm, Agbadarigi or Agbedeglime (inside blacksmith’s wall) was corrupted to Badagry by Europeans. Badagry served as a corridor for Europeans to carry slaves to new destinations in the early eighteenth century. Its cenotaph is called "Point of No Return," and the well at this location was charmed to make slaves who drank from it forget their fate. Badagry was one of the routes that benefited from the ongoing slave trade conflict between Portnovo and Dahomey at the end of the eighteenth century. Slaves taken during inter-village conflict were auctioned off at Badagry.

Chief Mobee was one of the African chiefs who participated in the slave trade in 1883. In Marina, Badagry, the first two-story structure was constructed in 1845.

=== 1736–1840 ===
Huntokonu set up a trading post on the gifted land in 1736 and it was after Huntɔkonu's settlement that Badagry emerged as a slave port, serving principally as an outlet for Oyo and displacing Apa politically and commercially. During this period, political refugees fleeing aggression from King Agaja Trudo migrated to Badagry. Agaja who was seeking an outlet to the sea was warring across the coast and the resulting war caused an influx of people living along the coast of Anlo, Keta, Weme, Quidah, Allada, Ajatche, and Popos to settle in Badagry. These group came to be known as Ewes/Ogu. Each migrant group were affiliated with Eight heterogeneous quarters and newly arrived immigrants settled in wards related to their state of origin. Badagry's wards were headed by commercial and political autonomous chiefs thereby creating a fragmented political structure. This flexibility was advantageous for trade but also caused internal instability.

Slave trading did not take place on the same massive scale in Badagry as occurred in Bonny, Angola, Ouidah, and Calabar; In 1865, the amount of slaves transported out of Badagry was 800, while at Porto Novo, the figure was 1,200, and at Ouidah, up to 5,000 slaves were transported. The peak period of the slave trade in the city state was between 1736 and 1789, but the trade continued into the early nineteenth century, with Portuguese or Brazilian traders taking over from the Dutch.

The rise of Badagry on the coast led to hostilities with Ouidah, which combined with Oyo and Lagos to sack the town in 1784. After the destruction, Jiwa, a political refugee from Porto-Novo took over the reins of most of the political structures between 1784 and 1788. In 1821, Oba Adele was exiled to Badagry. He proved to be a source of leadership, and was able to make Badagry a politically independent state. The founding of Abeokuta also proved beneficial to Badagry as the former made use of Badagry as an outlet for trading. Adele was involved with the famous trader, Madam Tinubu and sided with Egba's in their conflict with Ota and Ijebu. Among Adele's followers from Lagos were Muslims, mostly servants from the Northern region, and this group introduced Islam to the Ogu people in the city-state.

After the British abolished the slave trade, notable trader Francisco Félix de Sousa migrated to Badagry around 1807. Trade in ivory, cloth and palm oil were also important economic activities of residents. Thomas Hutton established a presence in Badagri in 1838, and other British traders followed in subsequent years. Unlike in the interior, Badagry's soil was not suitable for commercial agriculture, but farms were set up in areas surrounding the town. The palm oil trade was of considerable value to Badagry, as was an illegal trade in slaves directed by Brazilians. The influence of anti-slave trade raids and cession of Badagry to Britain put a stop to the trade.

=== 1840–1900 ===
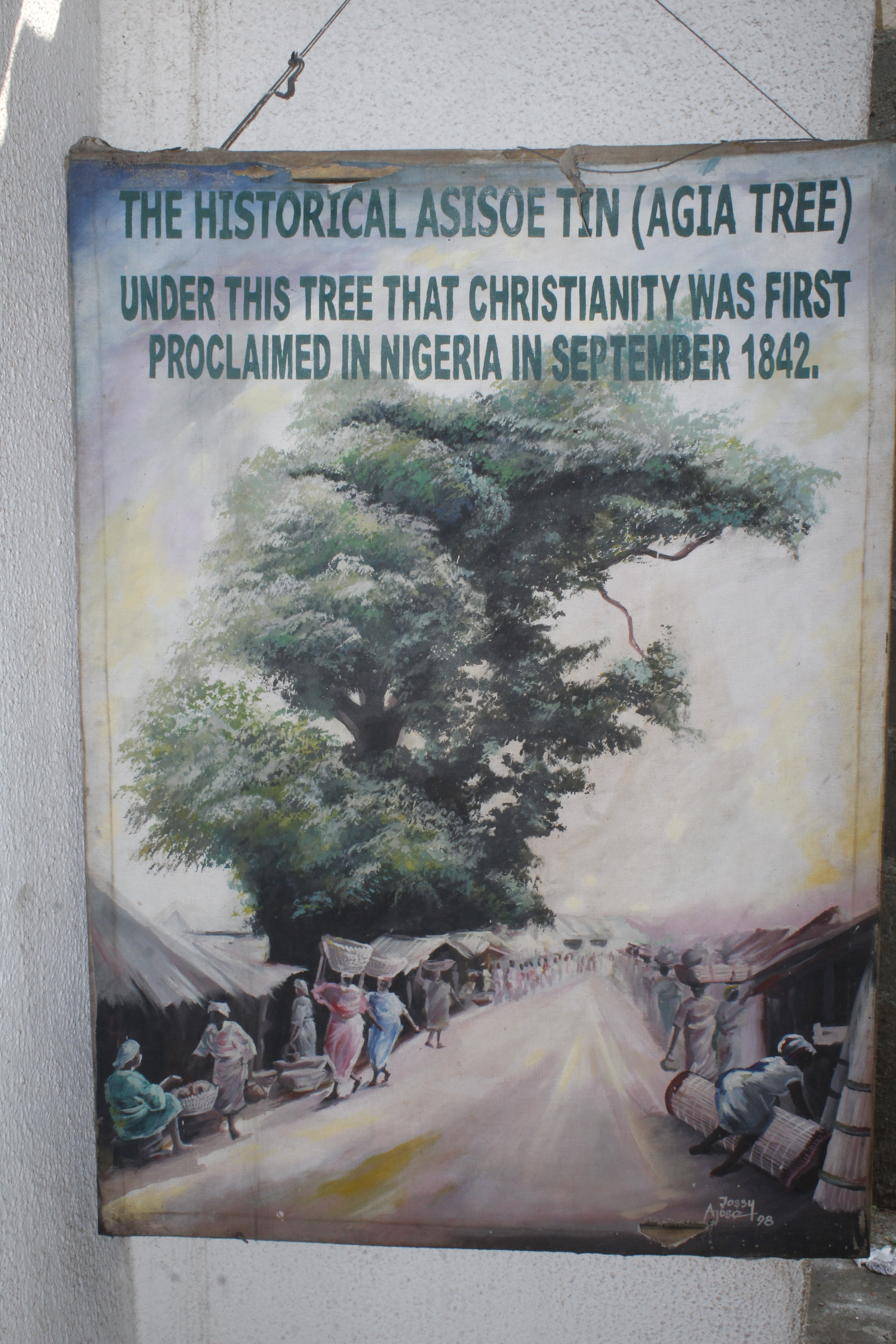
Picture of the Agia Tree where Christianity was first proclaimed in Nigeria

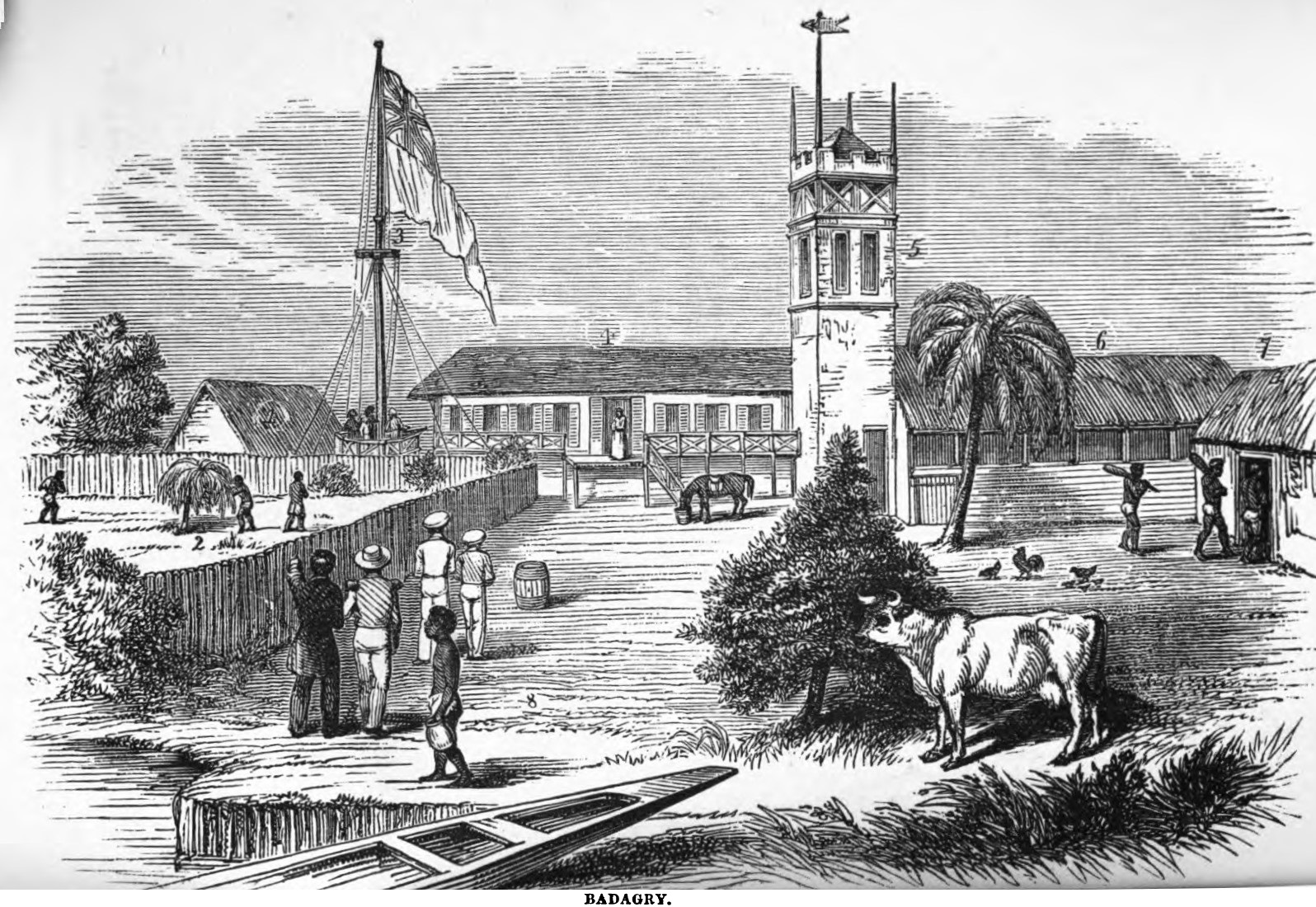
Badagry (February 1851)

Badagry's location as a coastal town with links northwards to Abeokuta and Oyo made it a port of entry for emigrants from Sierra Leone and missionaries. Around 1837, a settled Sierra-Leonean emigrant of the Methodist faith wrote a letter requesting a catechist in Badagry. The Methodists already had a missionary party in the Gold Coast, and some members were sent to Badagry. This party was led by Thomas Birch Freeman and Charles DeGraft. The Methodist missionaries first preached under an Agia tree and later erected a makeshift bamboo Church.

In 1845, a CMS missionary party arrived in Badagry. In the party were Revs. Townsend, Crowther and Gollmer, two teachers from Sierra Leone, some carpenters and wives of the party members. The intention of the party was to keep on moving to Abeokuta but as a result of the death of Sodeke, a chief in Abeokuta, they were delayed at Badagry. The party stayed in Badagry for a year and a half, building a mission house with two levels. Eugene Van Cooten joined the mission in 1850.

However, Christian proselytism in the first half of the nineteenth was not successful in Badagry, partly as a result of a civil war between 1851- 1854 and also as a result of Lagos becoming a British colony. In the years between the founding of the colony of Lagos and colony of Nigeria, Badagry lost influence to Lagos.

In 1863, wary of French influence in Porto-Novo, colonial Lagos signed a treaty of cession with Badagry chiefs.

The Congress of Berlin in 1884–1885, led to the displacement of the Gbe ethnolinguistic groups in the area, with especially the Badagry-Ogu/Ewe ethnic group falling under the British rule, and marginalized through being removed from the rest of the ethnolinguistic group.

=== Twentieth century ===
Between 1953 and 1965, Badagry was a divisional headquarters for an area composed of Badagry, Amuwo-Odofin, Ojo, and Ajeromi-Ifelodun. When Lagos State was created in 1967, it became one of the five administrative zones of the state.

=== Etymology ===
Gbede:gli:me- Gbe languages - Inside the blacksmith’s walls.

The first settler was a blacksmith known as Gbede or Agbede who relocated there from Porto Novo area and started an okra/okro farm. In order to protect his farm from wild animals, he erected a low mud wall. Neighboring communities started referring to the settlement as - Inside Agbede’s Walls. In Gbe cluster of languages, a blacksmith is called gbede or agbede. The name was corrupted to Badagry by the European traders. Yoruba immigration to the town has totally changed the character of Badagry to a Yoruba town.

=== Quarters ===
The city-state of Badagry was divided into eight wards with each having a traditional head. The eight wards are Jegba (Akran, The ruling house), Asago (Bala), Ganho (Agoloto), Posuko (Possu), Boeko (Mobee), Ahoviko (Wawu), Ahwanjigo (Jengen), and Wharakoh(vihento).

=== Archaelogy ===
A hallmark of Badagry’s infrastructure were its slave barracoons, which were where enslaved persons were typically held. These structures were built by Brazilian slave merchants under the order of Chief Sunbu Mobee, a notable figure involved in the slave trade. Although they are only a couple barracoons remaining, there were approximately 40 barracoons at the site. Each barracoon could hold up to 40 people and were typically 1.2 by 1.2 m (4 by 4 ft).

Another prominent figure involved with the material culture of Badagry is Chief Seriki Williams Abass who also participated in slave transactions. His personal collections, including personal objects like porcelain dishes and robes, obtained through trade and objects like shackles and chains that were used to restrain enslaved persons are currently preserved at the Seriki Faremi Williams Abass Museum in Badagry.

Moreover, other artifacts that were entangled with the transatlantic slave trade are currently held in Badagry's Heritage Museum, another notable museum of the city. Artifacts included in the museum include drinking pots, which were large pots from which enslaved persons would dip their hands in to get water. In addition to drinking pots, Badagry contained one well, known as the Attenuation Well, which served a distinct purpose. Before enslaved persons would be brought to the Americas, they were forced to drink from the well, and it was believed that they would forget their past lives. It is unclear when the well was dug, but it still serves a lasting impact as "The Point of No Return" in Badagry.

== Culture ==
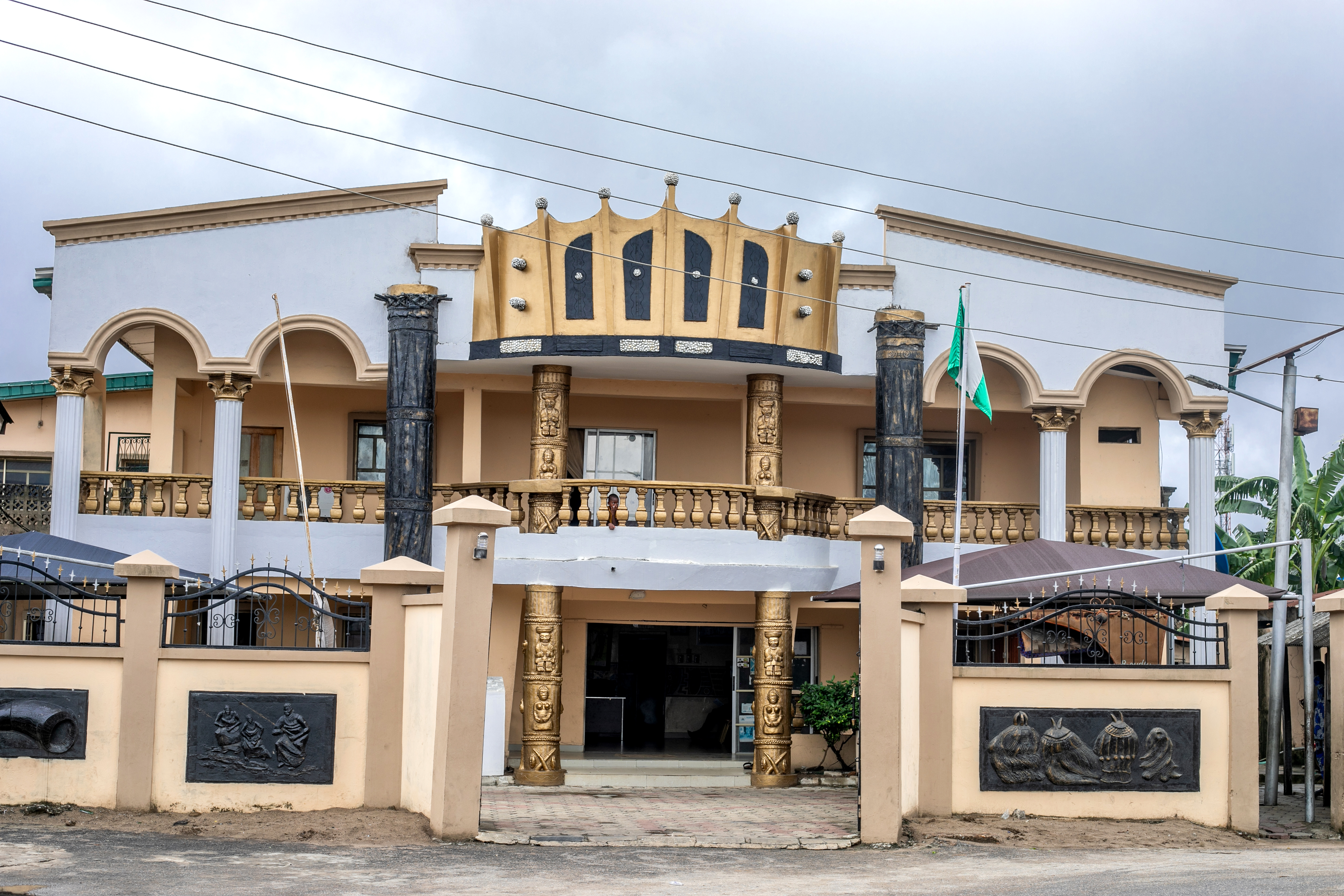
Palace of the Akran of Badagry

A number of festivals are celebrated in Badagry, including the Ajido Zangbeto cult, Igunnuko festival and Badagry diaspora and heritage festivals. Ajido Zangbeto festival was supported by Lagos state, various groups, like the royal fathers, women of Zangan, Yonnusi, Kregbeto, Zan holu, Ohugigo, and others danced as friends guests and tourists paid tribute to the king, Aholu Saheed Sedonu Adamson, Topon Toviaga 1, of Ajido kingdom. Aholu Adamson said, "Zangbeto" is a socio cultural heritage that is celebrated in high esteem with commitment by the Egun (Ogu) people. Ajido keyed into the Lagos state Government's proclamation that Lagos state was the hub of tourism. The native language of Badagry is Ewe/egun (Ogu)a dialect of Aja/Ewe and similar to the Fon language, an Aja sub-group that is spoken in Porto-Novo.

Ancient Badagry had a traditional religion close to vothun and various traditional places of worship. Shrines were located in different quarters of the town including Nabruku at Ijegba, Vlekete at Posuko, and Mathe at Adariko. In modern Badagry, adherents of Islam and Christianity populate the town.

Zangbeto masquerade is a powerful cultural form among the Ogu (Egun) people. This particular masquerade is one of the traditional ways of crime control, policing and security among Egun people of Badagry. Zangbeto’s primary aim is to secure the community. The masquerade also serves to entertain people as they dance by spinning around fast, shrinking and growing in height as the masquerade turns.

An illusion about Zangbeto masquerade dates back to when an Egun man was said to have been pursued by his enemies, Egun man needed to flee from his hometown unnoticed in the night. But then, it was said to have used supernatural powers to disguise himself, not to be caught by his enemies which are after his life. He covered his body with dried leaves and raffia and by making scary sounds with the horns of an animal. He was eventually able to leave the town unharmed and undetected by his enemies. He later found a settlement called 'Hugbonu' and subsequently, had men with him dressed in a similar manner; the men helped him secure the settlement as well as preventing attacks on him. This was beginning of the Zangbeto masquerade.

Zangbeto masquerade could do a lot of interesting things with the help of magic/ supernatural powers. This is the main reason they are held in high esteem by the Ogu (Egun) people and are regarded as deity. There are public displays of power such as crossing rivers by walking on water, turning bucket of water into wine as well as dancing bottles. Zangbeto watch over the community at night wandering around to detect thieves and dispense justice. They are followed by a group of drummers and makes an 'eerie' humming noise to announce their arrival. During the night watch their horn sounded to announce the beginning of the watch and also to alert people that the group is about coming out, using the magical powers, Zangbeto masquerade could notice anyone loitering within a radius of 500 metres and above. Aside securing lives, they also help to settle disputes and make peace among Ogu ( Egun people) Zangbeto masquerade serves numerous function in the lives of the Egun people of Badagry.

=== Agemo Francis Sewanu ===
Agemo Francis Sewanu, a mixed media Nigerian Artist, was born in Badagry in 1986. He studied fine Arts at the Delta State University Abraka from where he graduated in 2008. Agemo, whose works have been influenced by the Thron, Atinga, Tolegba and Tovothun,( gods and goddess) of Egun (ogu) people is representing Nigeria. Francis Sewanu Agemo art has evolved over the years through the upbringing with his grandparents, who are faithful worshipers of the Thron, Atinga and Tovothun (gods and goddess of Egun people). Francis Sewanu Agemo had enriching cultural encounters at the shrine and these have informed his artistic development. Agemo, who spoke to vanguard in an exclusive interview stated that " he has over time developed his forms and figures that bear semblance to the objects of worship like totems, statues, masks and raffia threads. Francis Sewanu Agemo made us known that his art poses a look at the duality between tradition and Contemporaneity .

Francis Sewanu Agemo, art exhibition which opened on September 19 and run till September 23, Agemo's works are attracting a lot attention from other artists, curators and art lovers of other cultures who are obviously fascinated to be witnessing original African culture, especially from the ancient international slave town of Badagry, transmitted to them in art form. This magic, Agemo told vanguard is made possible " with my artistic philosophy which he made possible " with my artistic philosophy which I refer to as Tracontemporary- A blend of traditions that is not alienated from contemporary realities and transformations.

Agemo is a kind of historian on canvas. His paintings are mostly narrations of fragmental histories and societal discussions, political issues, ancestral rites and abandoned beliefs. Most times Francis Sewanu Agemo tell stories on his canvass about abandoned beliefs, culture and tradition of his people one of the famous works of Agemo is titled "The lucky woman", which he did during a residency at Alexis Galleries, Lagos. "This work," said Agemo, "is talking about a man who has two wives but the first wife is not able to give the man a male child. All her children are girls. So the man is now looking for another wife that can give him the male children he needs. Here, he finds the woman. Though she is ugly and deformed ( she has only one eyes) she is able to give the man the child he looking for." The message in this work is that physical appearance- ugliness and deformity don't really count. Which it comes to productivity and achievements. These things are not hindrance to success in life. There is an inner beauty, and that is what counts. One may look ugly in appearance but the character or product of that person may be what is desirable. The ugly and the deformed woman is the one who is able to produce the male child; hence she becomes the lucky woman, which is where the title of the work was derived from.

Agemo believes that the world is very small. It may be smooth or rough which is a reality of life; everyday as we go out, we may meet good or bad.

Good and bad all work together, says Agemo. Most of his figures for his art drawn from status in Badagry, artifacts and cultural products- the shrines, e.t.c which Francis Sewanu Agemo the artist uses to create his own concept.

== Economy ==
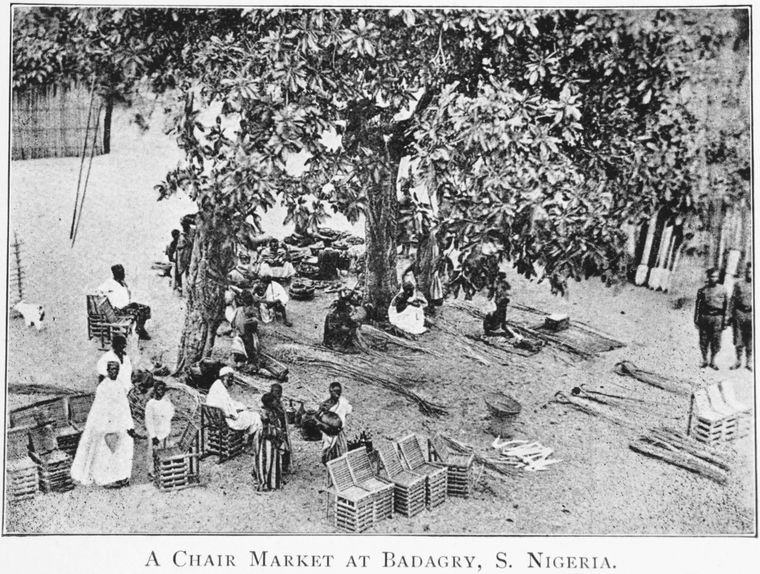
A chair market at Badagry in 1910

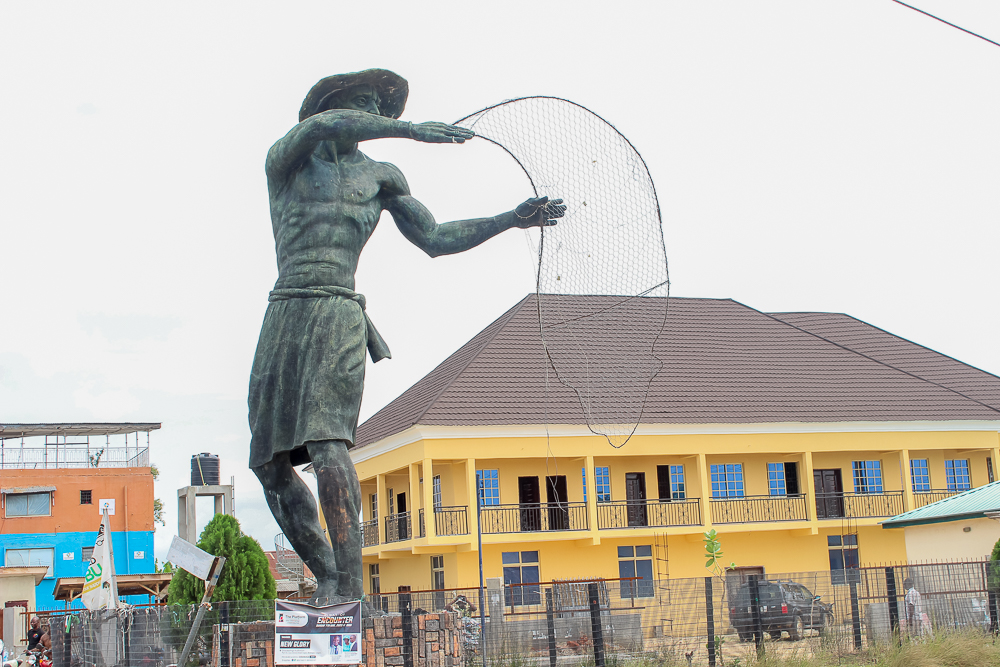
Fisherman statue in Badagry, representing the region's fishing industry

The major economic activities in Badagry include fishing, trading, and tourism. Badagry's closeness to the sea and its historical past with the Trans-Atlantic slave trade and missionaries attracts tourists to the town. A pre-fabricated house built by Thomas Birch Freeman is considered by some as the first story building in Nigeria while Freeman's Methodist Church is the first settlement of Christian missions in Nigeria.

The governor of the state, Governor Sanwo-Olu urged the Nigerian Ports Authority (NPA) to build two additional Seaports, one in Lekki and another in Badagry. He said "Lagos State needs to have two other Ports, which will not only serve us but also build the national economy. We have initiated the development of Lekki Sea Port, which has started. We are building another Port in Badagry. But we are still in conversation with the NPA to grant the approval because we have added five developers, financiers, and partners on the Badagry Port. If we can finish the construction of both Sea Ports, it would free up.the congestion in the Apapa axis and create a new business hub for our people".

Thangbe Temple of Harmless Pythons in Dale-Whedakoh Kingdom

The aboriginal people of Badagry are of Whedah (Quidah), Weme, Alladah stock, and the Dale-Whedakoh Kingdom is the ancestral headquarters of all Whedahs found in special quarters of Badagry like Ahovikoh, Boekoh, Awhanjigoh and Asagoh.

The reverence of Dale-Whedakoh Kingdom among the Whédah descendants is partly because it is the traditional head of the dynasty and custodian of "Thangbe Deity" of all Whedahs.

Till date live "Thangbe Deity" - the Harmless Pythons of the Whédahs in Nigeria are sacredly housed in Thagbekoh quarters of Dale-Whedakoh Kingdom.

Just like Quidah in Benin Republic, many tourists and lovers of African culture and tradition visits Dale-Whedakoh regular to experience the Harmless Pythons of the Whédahs people worldwide.

Moreso, Dale-Whedakoh is an autonomous kingdom with its own kingship but same customs, religion, culture and tradition as all other Whédah quarters in Badagry, Lagos and Nigeria as a whole.

While the aforementioned Badagry quarters has Chiefs, the King of Dale-Whedakoh is Aholu Samuel Wheaton, The Aholu Shewhenu Toyon I.

Dale-Whedakoh Kingdom is the ancestral owners and overlord of the popular Topo community nearest to it eastwards (Not Topo Island).

== Important places in Badagry ==
Palace of the Mobee of Badagry Kingdom

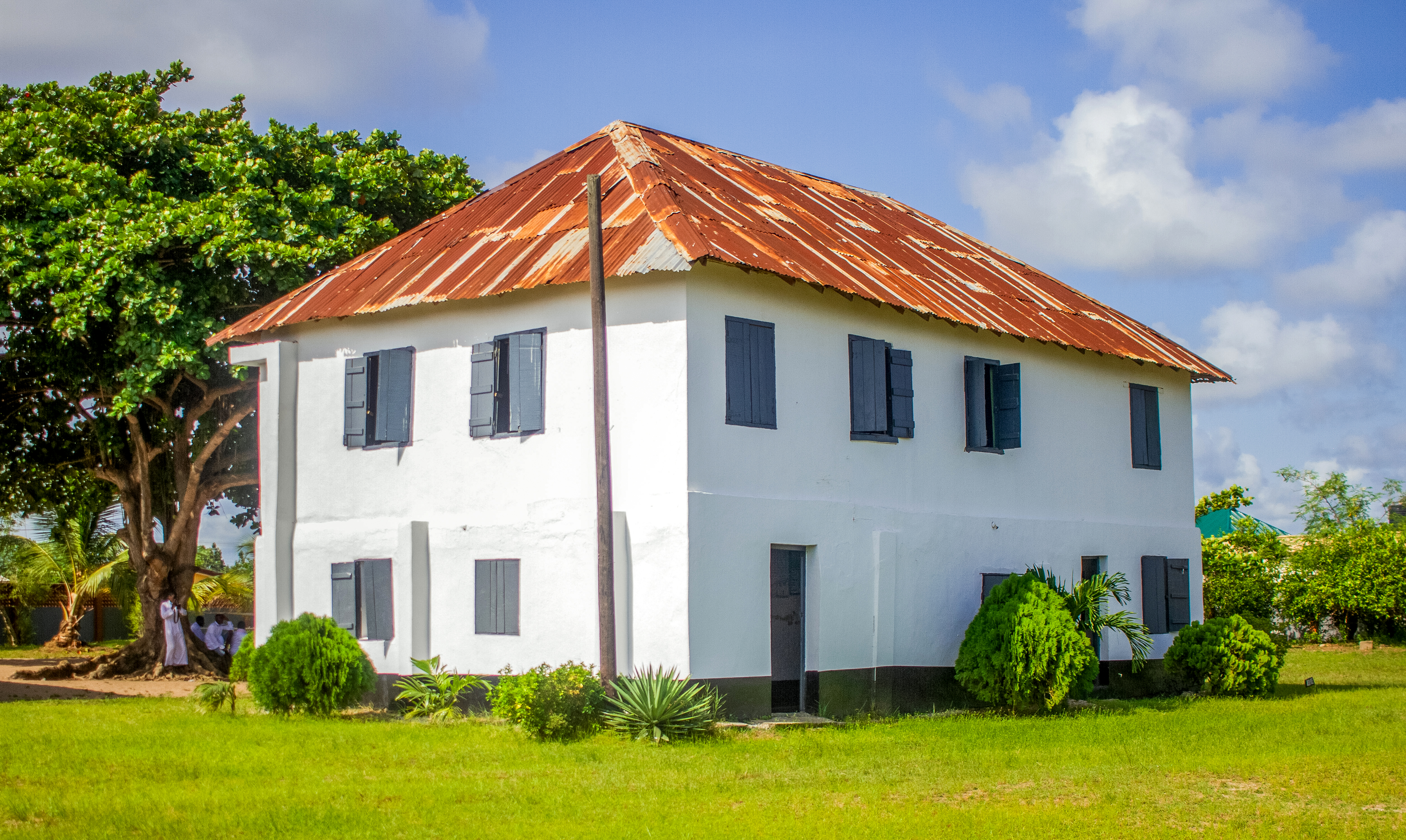
First story building in Nigeria

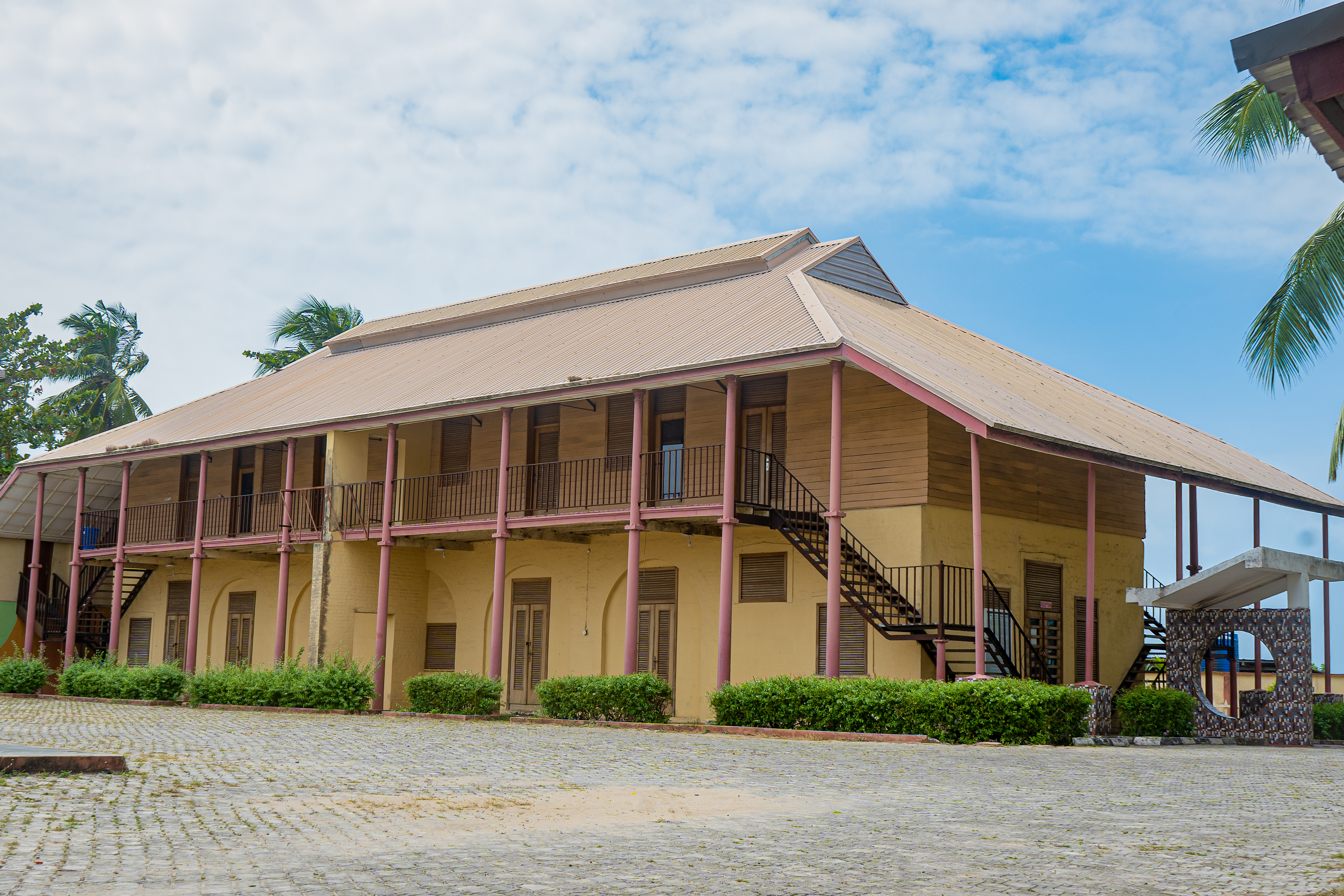
The First Administrative Building, now Badagry Heritage Museum

=== The Royal Palace of Mobee ===
The Royal Palace Of Mobee is a historical Slave Relics museum housed in a 19th-century colonial building. It is a repository of the role played by local "Chief Mobee" in conniving with slave masters to capture locals during the transatlantic slave trade, as well as the opposite role played by of his son in overturning slavery in the area. The museum shows evidence of the arrival of Europeans to the Badagry area and the origins of the humans traded for money, gin and other things. Artefacts that are reminders of the savagery of the capture, entrapment, and enslavement of African people include yokes, chains, a mouth lock to silence the captives, and handcuffs for children. Historical records provide visitors with information about the terrible conditions faced by the slaves during the passage, and images provide representations of life on the plantations. It is a source often referenced during Black History Month.

=== The first storey building in Nigeria ===
The first-storey building is located in Badagry, Lagos State. The foundation of the building was started in 1842 and completed in 1845. It was erected by Reverend Henry Townsend of the Church Missionary Society (CMS). Samuel Ajayi Crowther, the first African CMS Bishop, lived there when he undertook the translation of the Holy Bible from English to Yoruba. It was also used as a Vicarage for Saint Thomas Anglican church.

=== The Point of No Return ===
The Point of No Return is located on Gberefu Island. This was the gateway for transporting slaves off the coast of Badagry to Europe and America.

=== The Agia Tree ===
The place where Christmas was first celebrated in Nigeria by Reverend Freeman and Reverend Townsend on 25 December 1842.

=== Museums ===
- Badagry Heritage Museum, including the First Administrative Building
- Seriki Williams Abass Slave Museum, located in the former Slave Barracoon of Seriki Williams Abass
- Velekete Slave Market Museum
- Mobee Royal Family Slave Relics Museum

=== Major Settlements And Kingdoms ===
- Ajido
- Joforo
- Age Mowo
- Ago Hausa
- Agonrin
- AjaraTopa
- Ajara Agamaden
- Ajara Dokoh
- Ajara Toriko
- Ajara Vetho
- Ajara Agelaso
- Ajara Tande
- Afoyonde
- Akarakumo
- Akoro
- Ale
- Angorin
- Apa
- Esepe-Musin
- Badagry Town
- Epeme
- Iragon
- • Notable people
- Sesi Oluwaseun Whingan
- Oba C. D. Akran
- De Wheno Aholu Menu-Toyi I, (Babatunde Akran) Akran Of Badagry
- Maupe Ogun
- Joseph Dosu

== Major Roads and Streets ==
- Samuel Ekudayo road
- Joseph Dosu Way
- General Hospital Way
- Ascon Road
- Lagos - Badagry Expressway
- Vlekete road
- Posuko road
- Olad Lagos-Badagry Road
- Badagry-Seme Expressway
- Zoglo way
- Marina road
- Palace way
- Aradagun-Iworo, Ajido road
- Inspectorate road

== Gallery ==
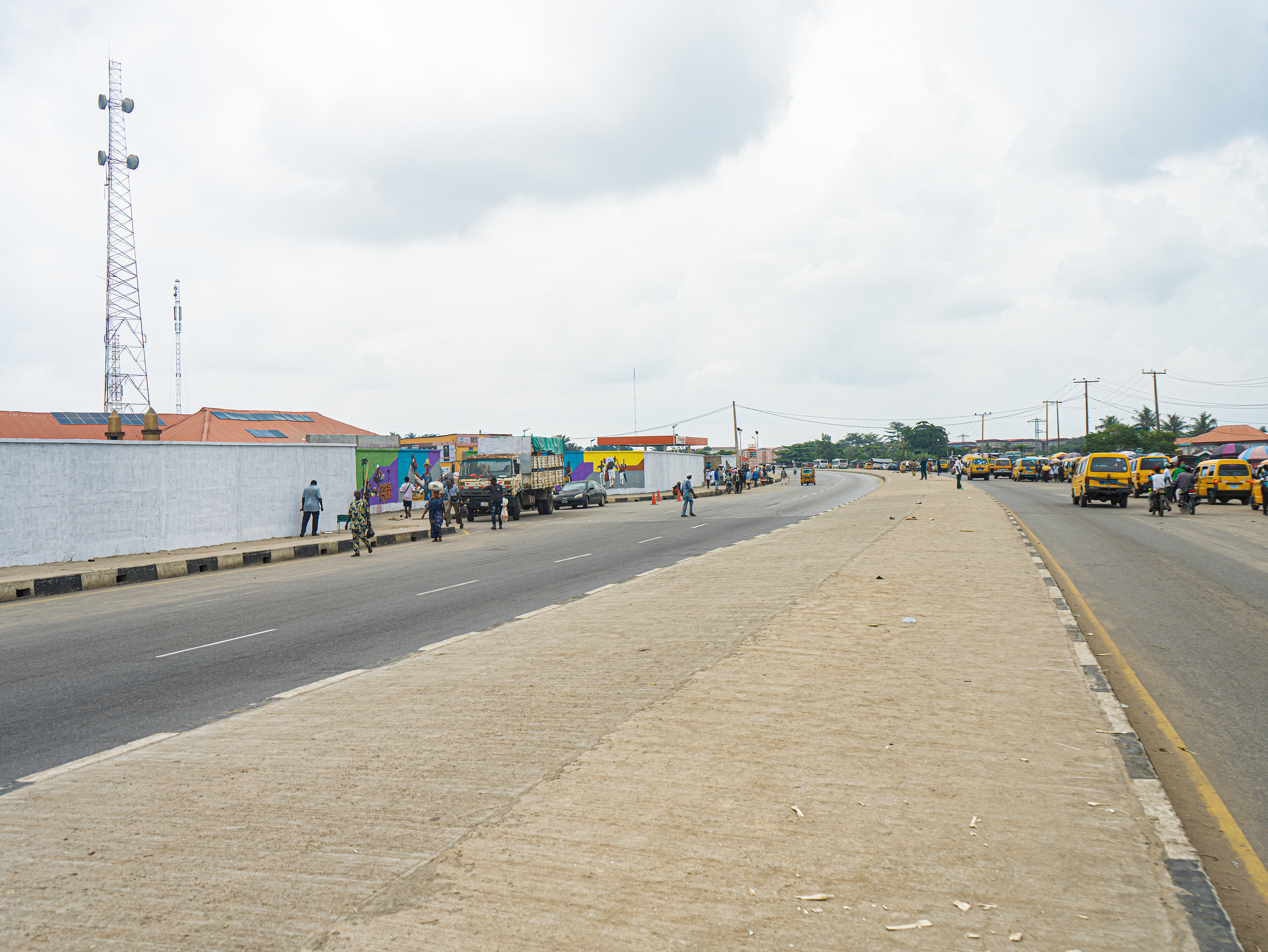
Lagos-Badagry expressway

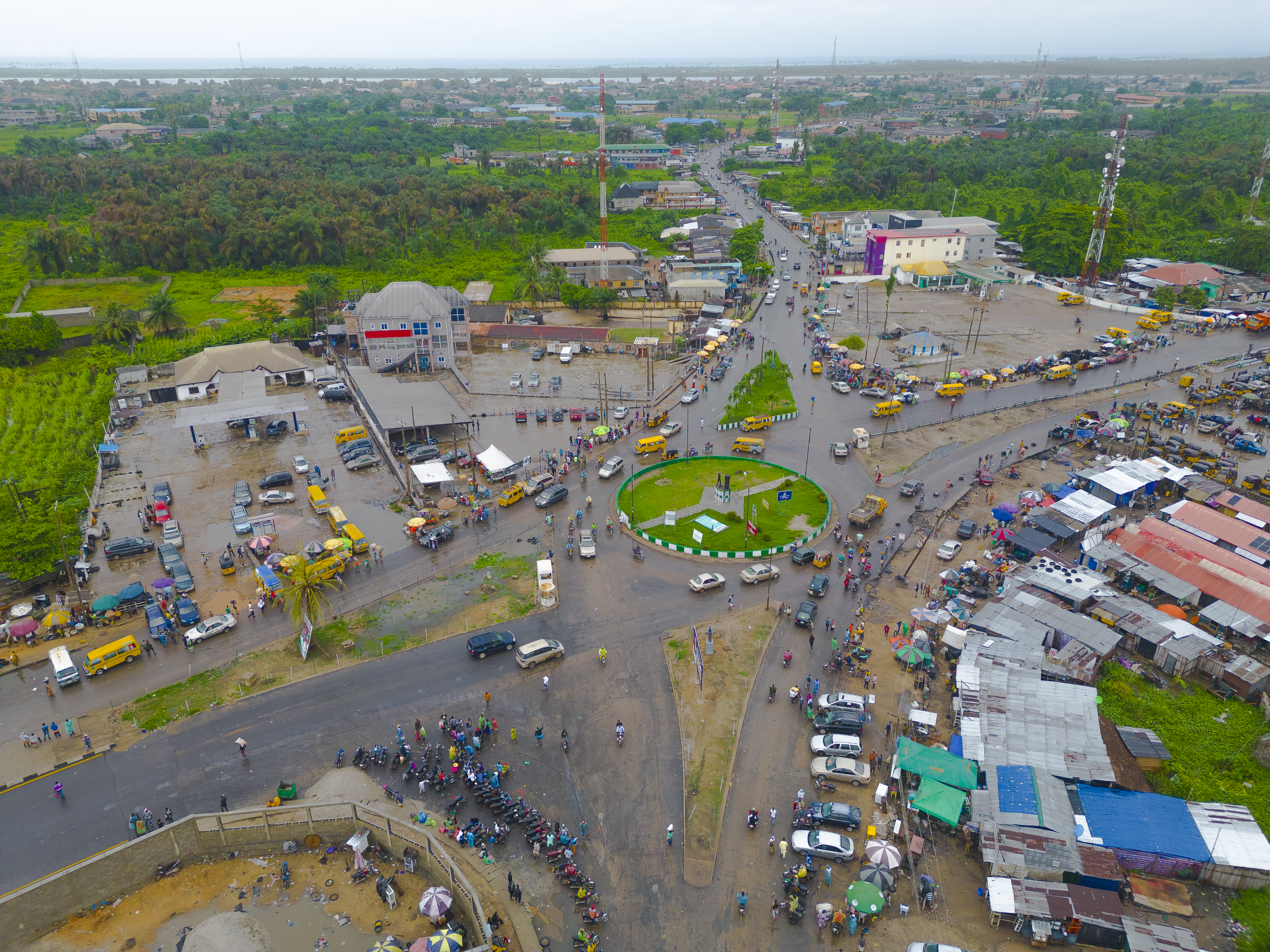
Badagry Round-about

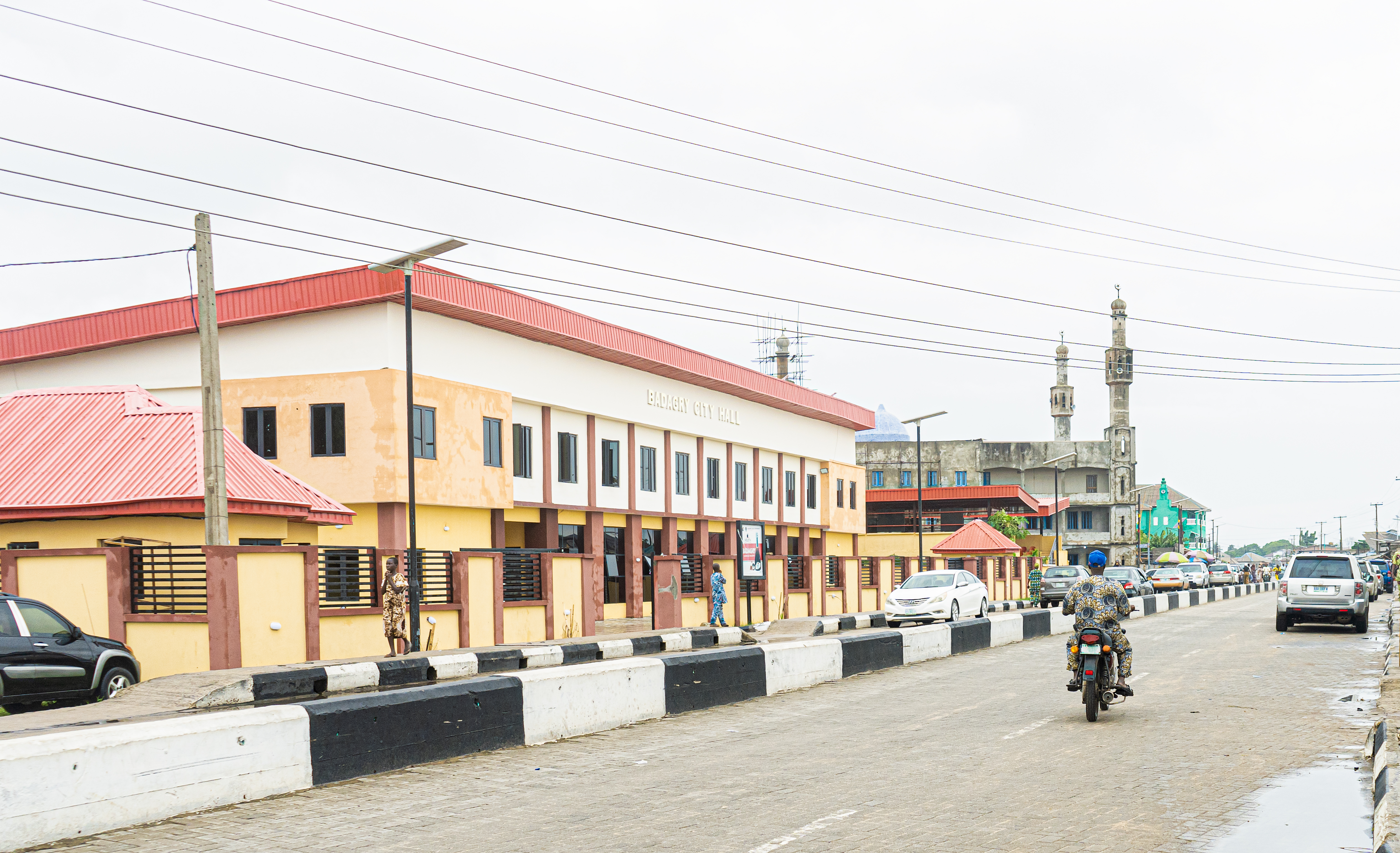
Terminal end of Zoglo way

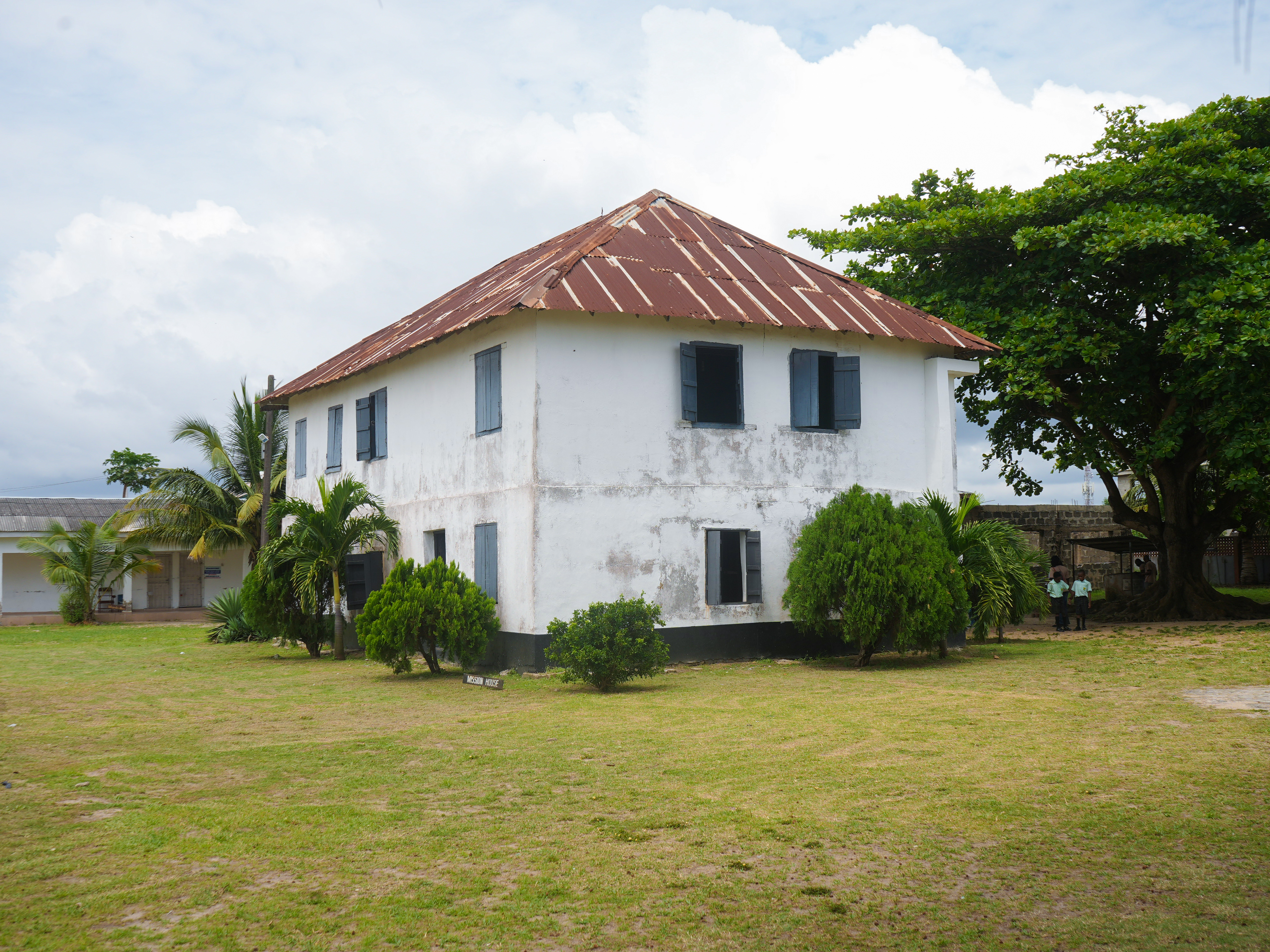
First Storey

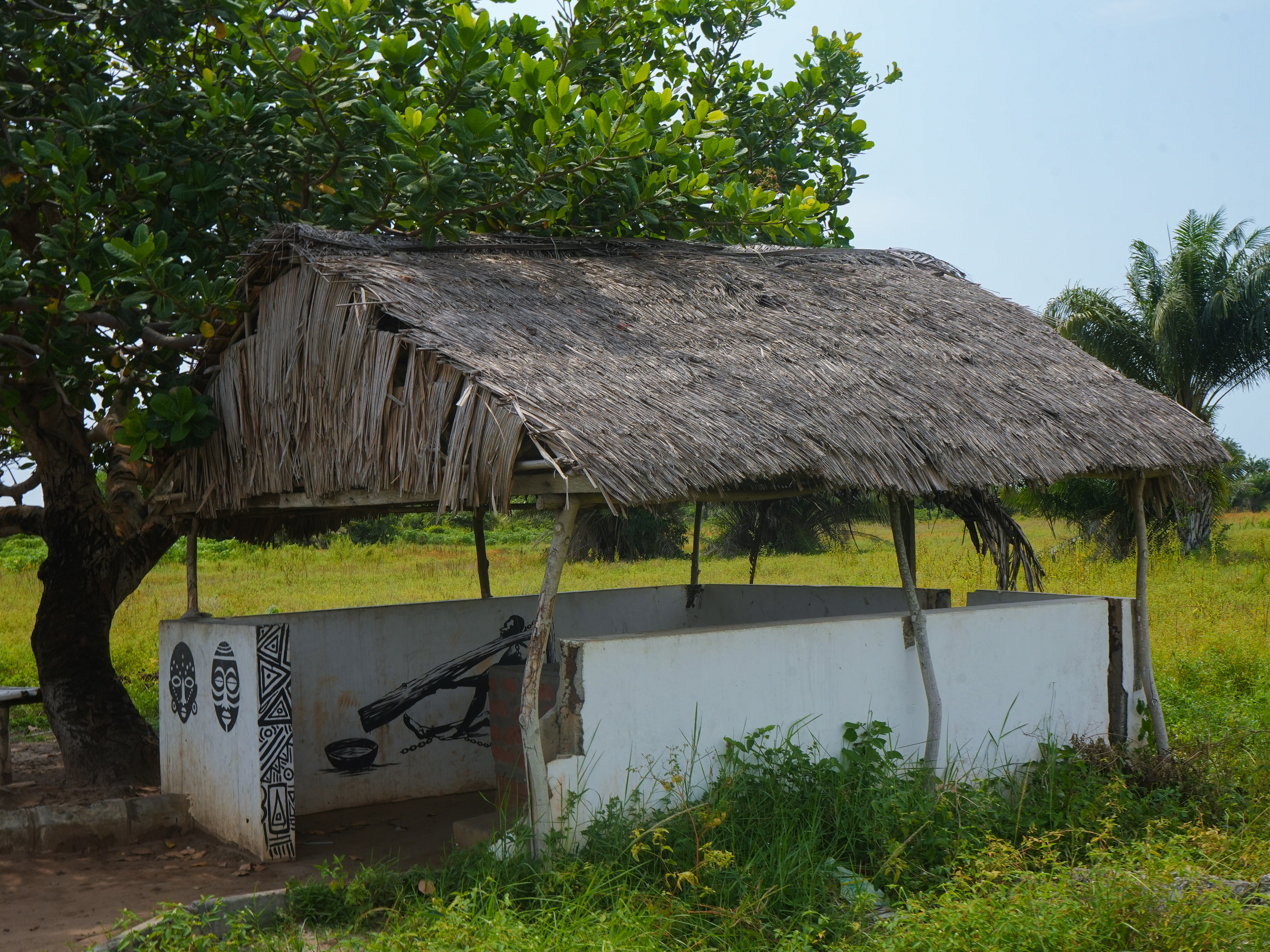
Attenuation Well

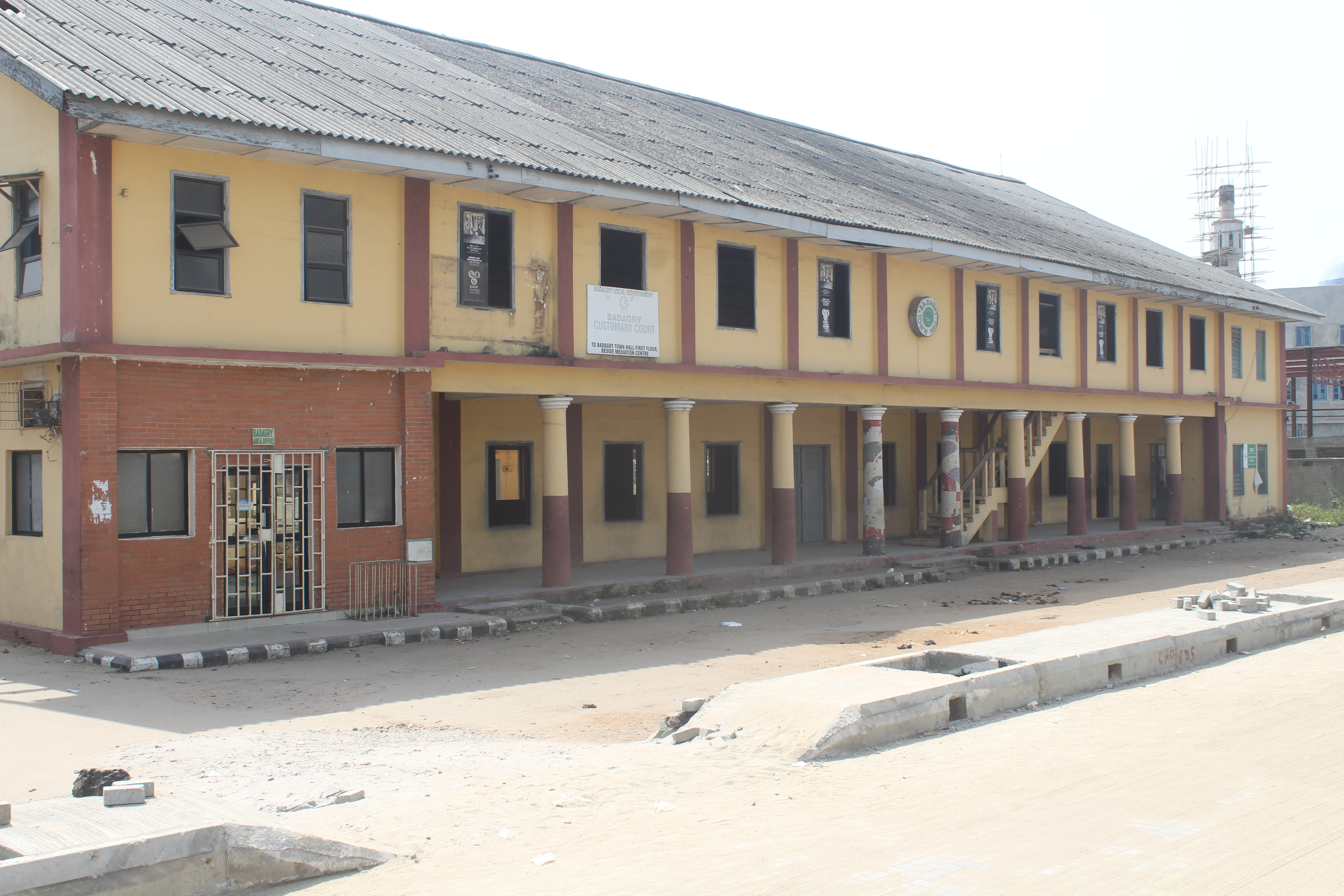
Old Badagry Town Hall

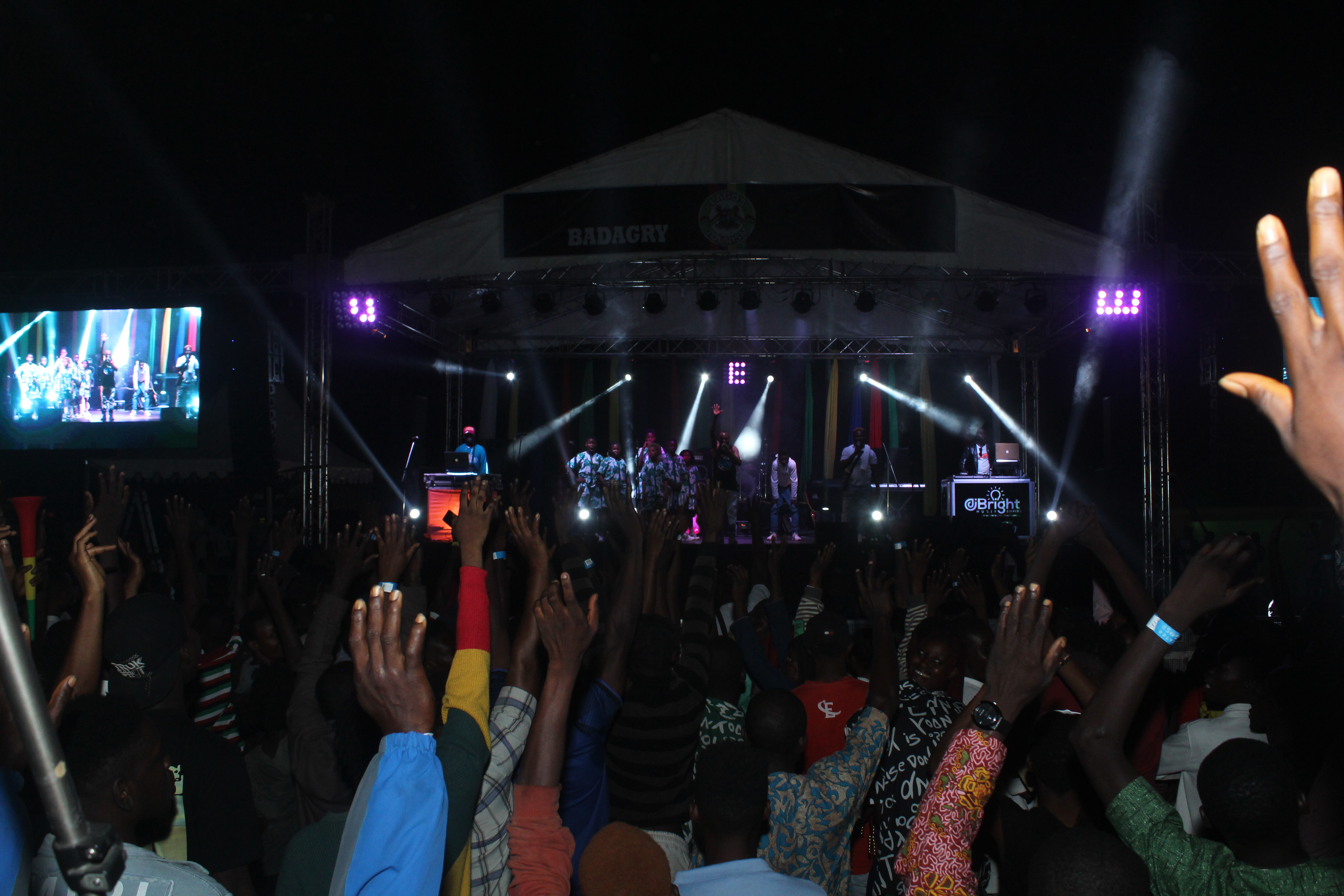
Greater Lagos 2022 In Badagry

Ogu (Egun) Wikipedia Promotion Video

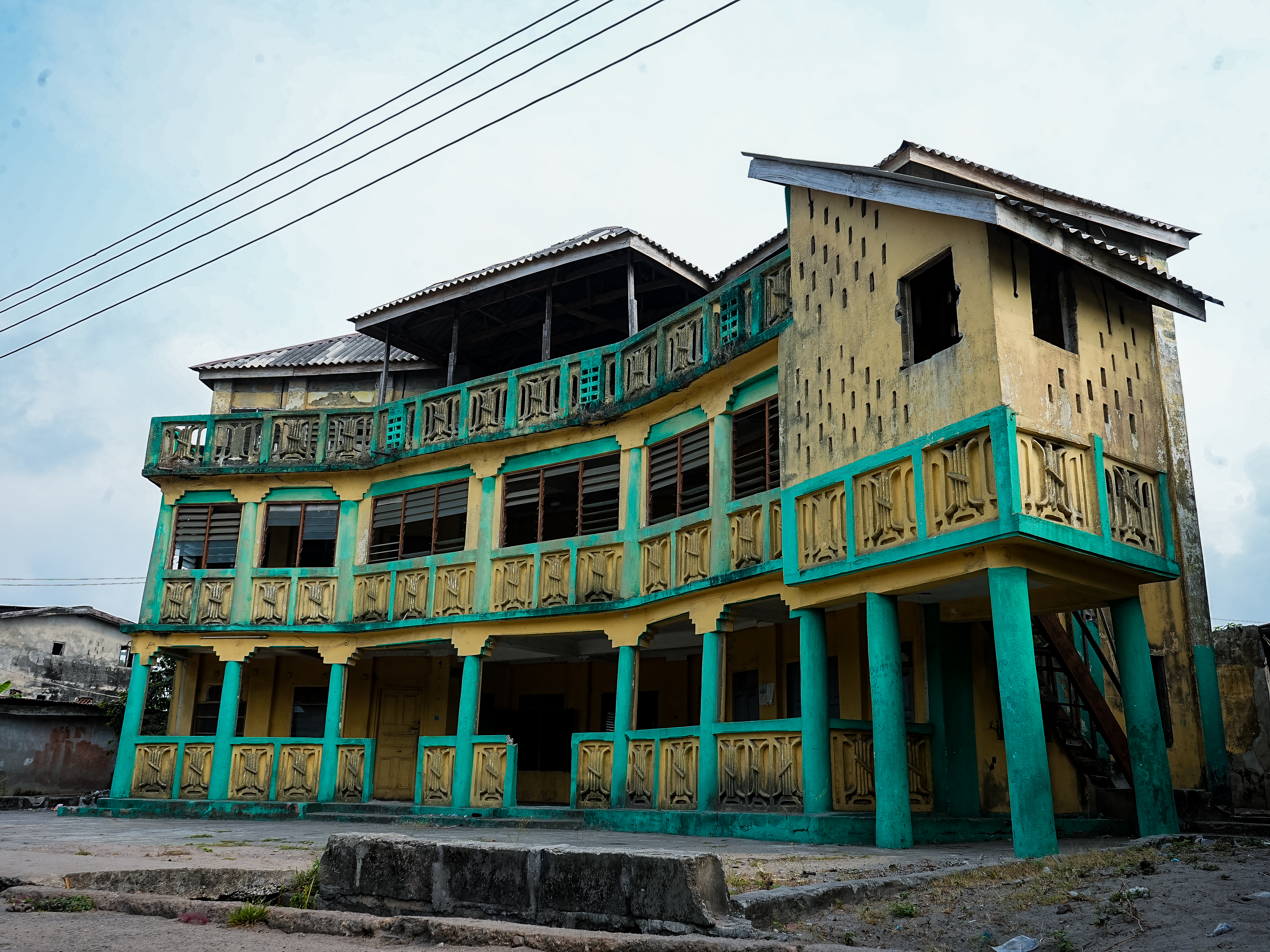
Old Akran Palace

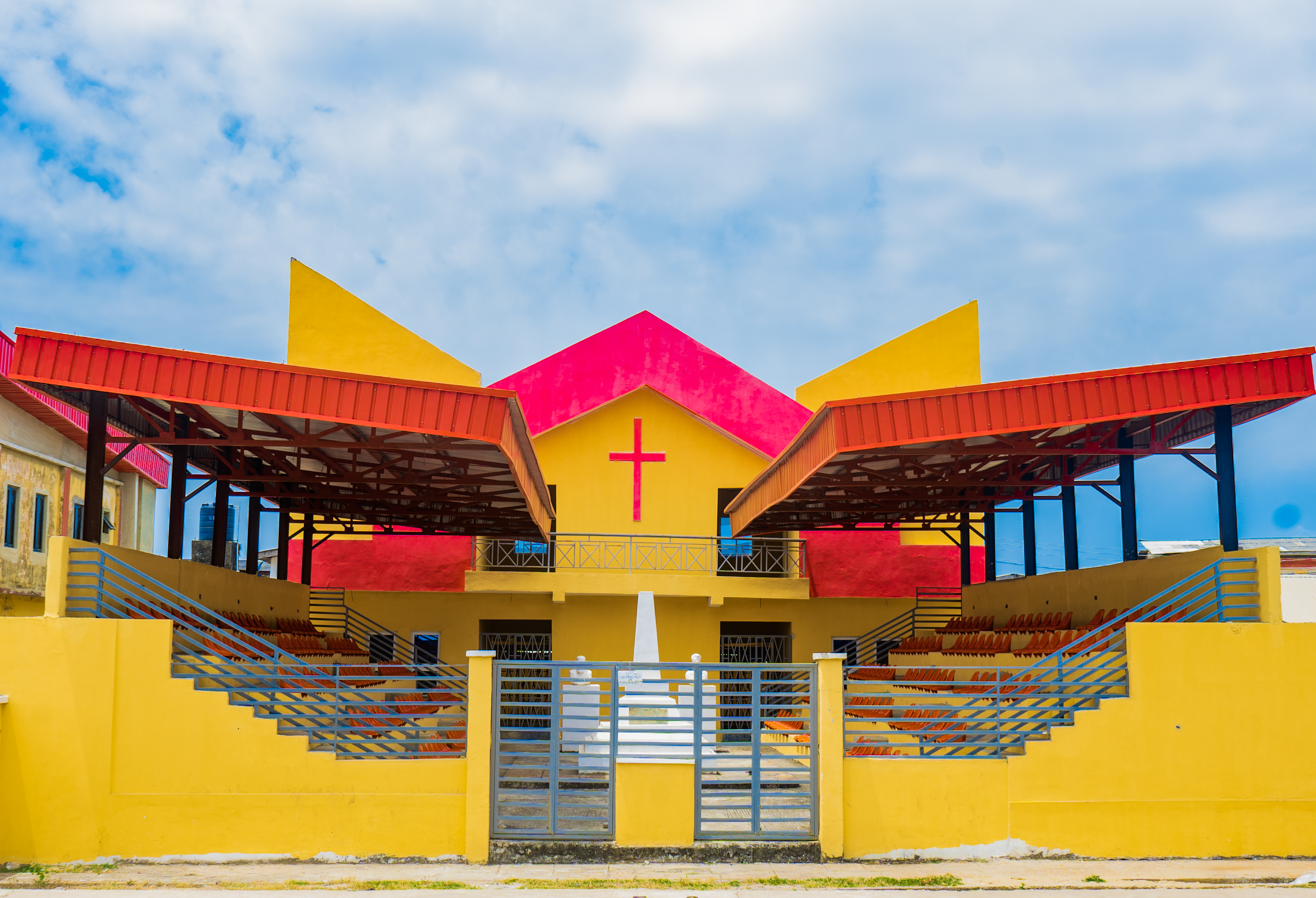
Modern Agia Tree in Badagry

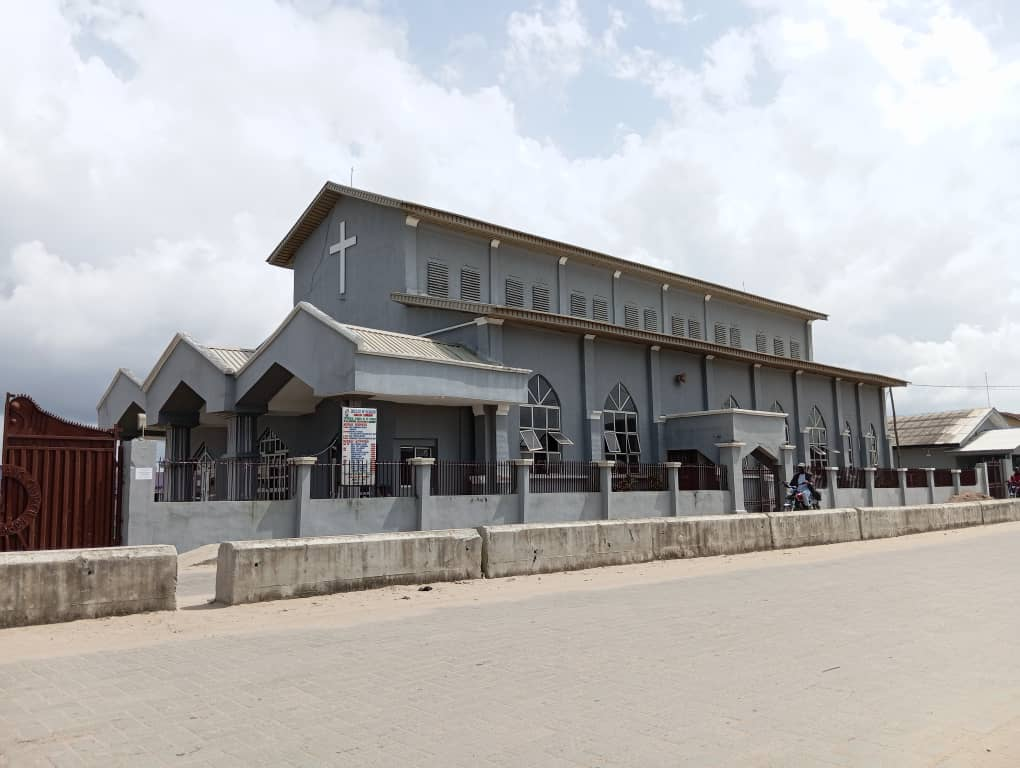
Saint Thomas's Anglican Church Badagry

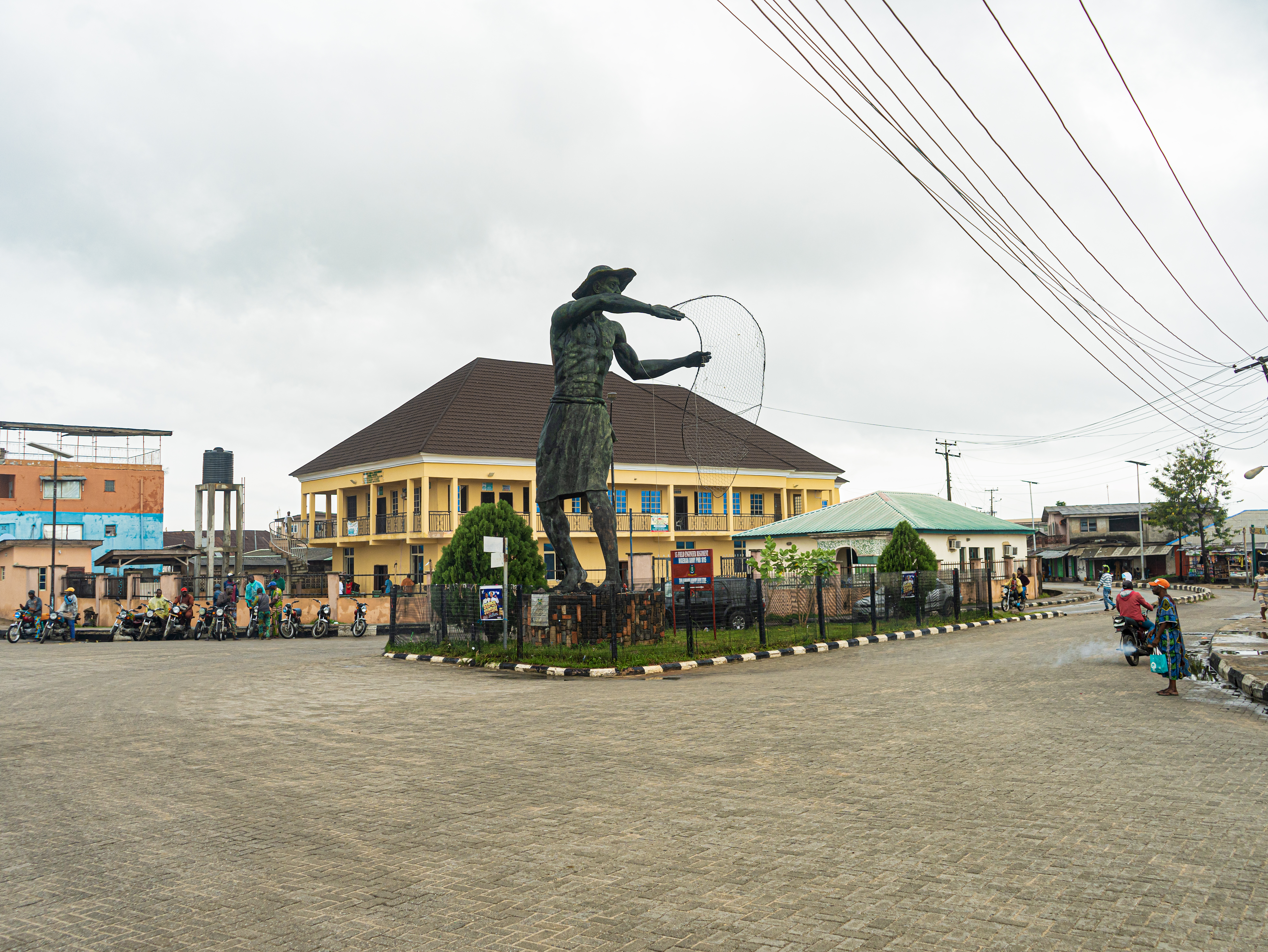
Terminal end of Jeseph Dosu way

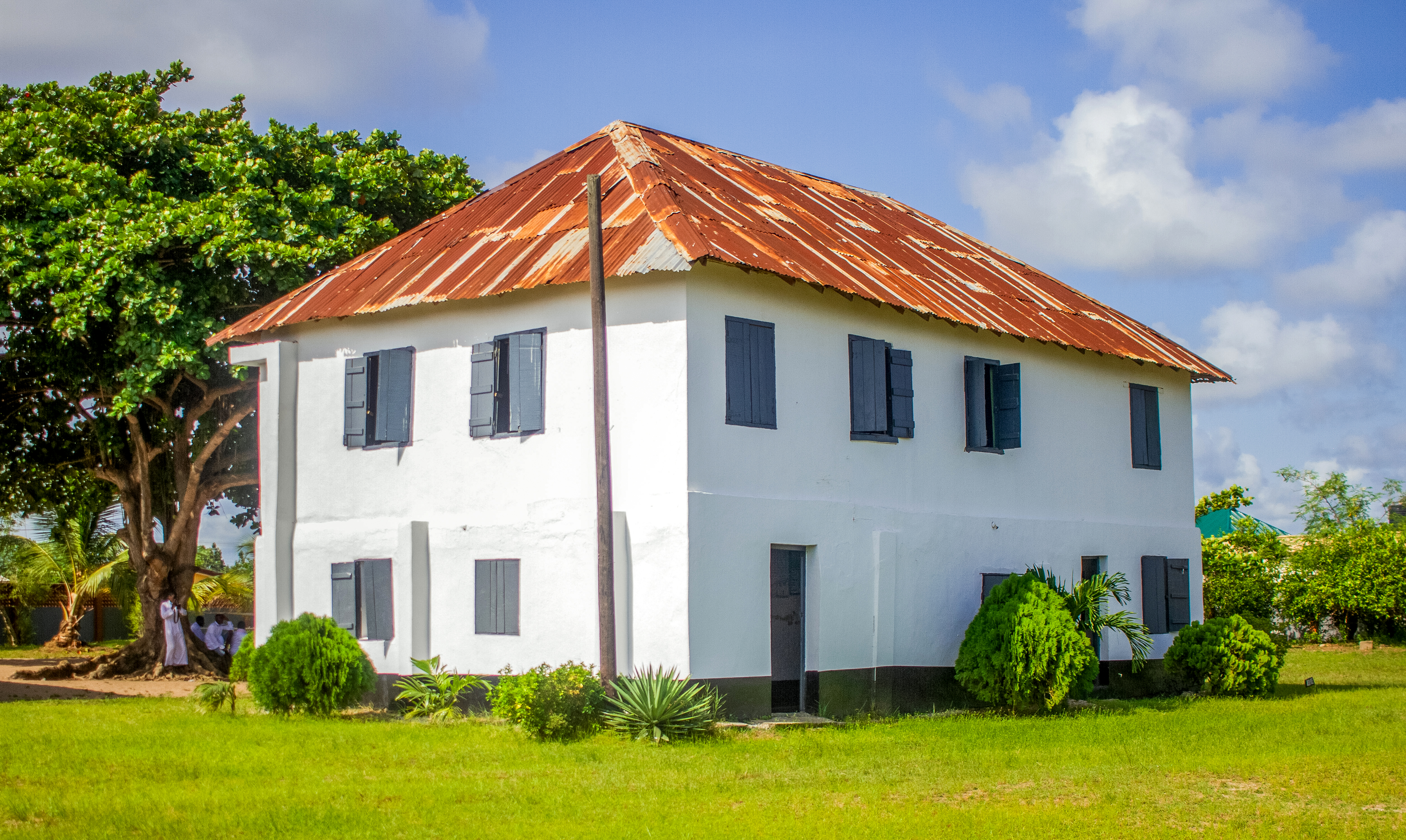
First Storey

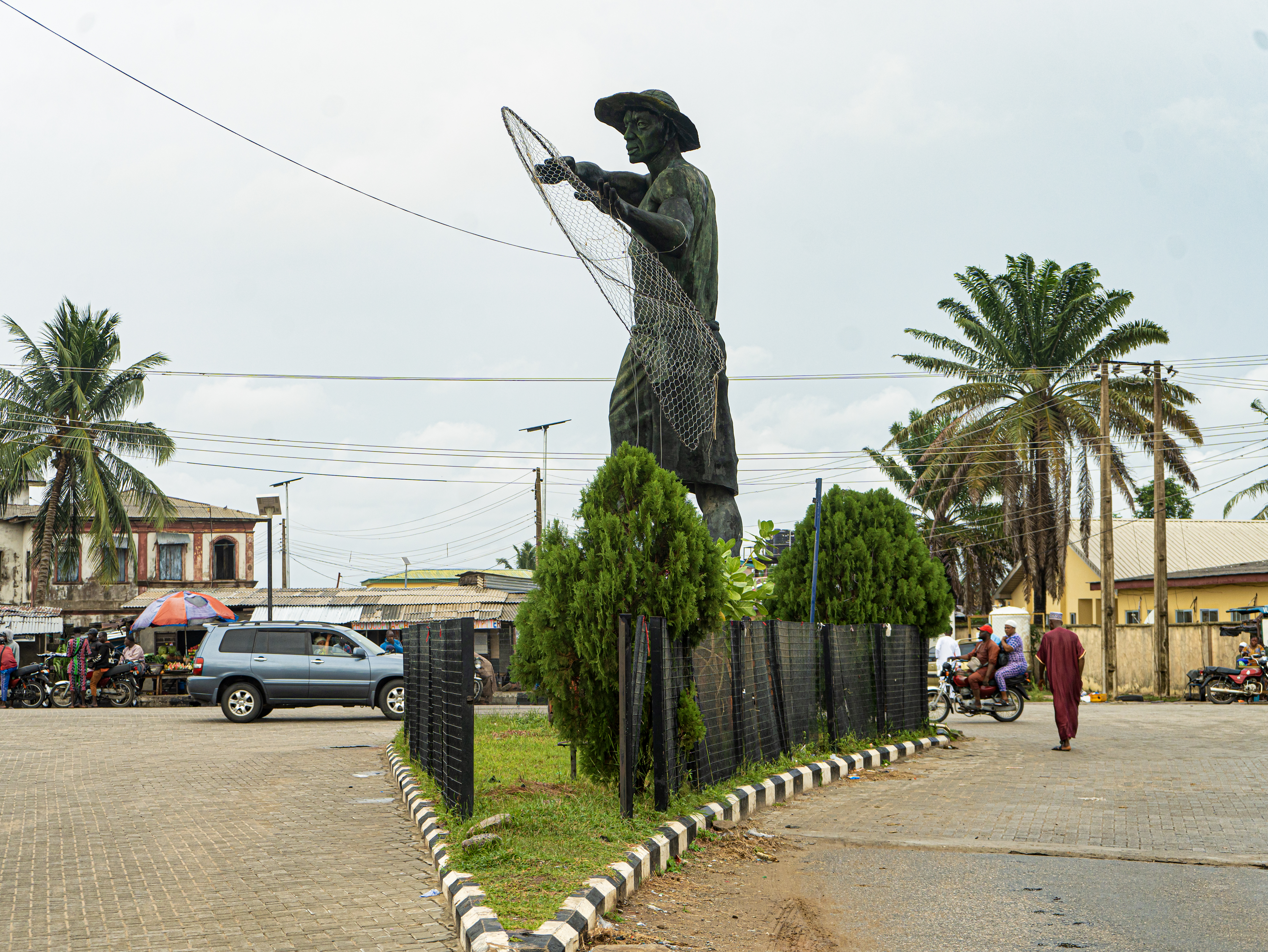
Fisherman Statue

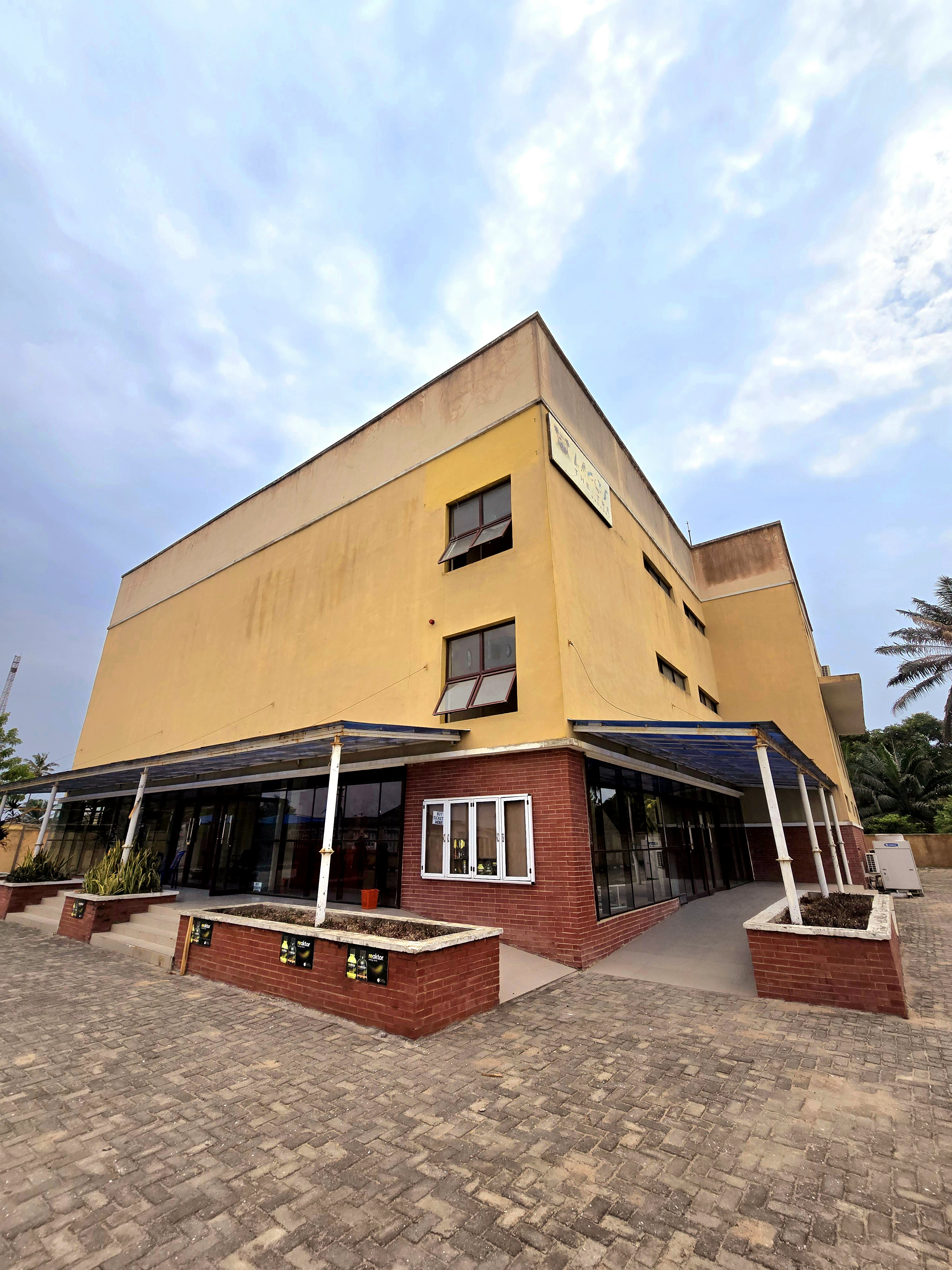
Exterior of the Badagry theatre

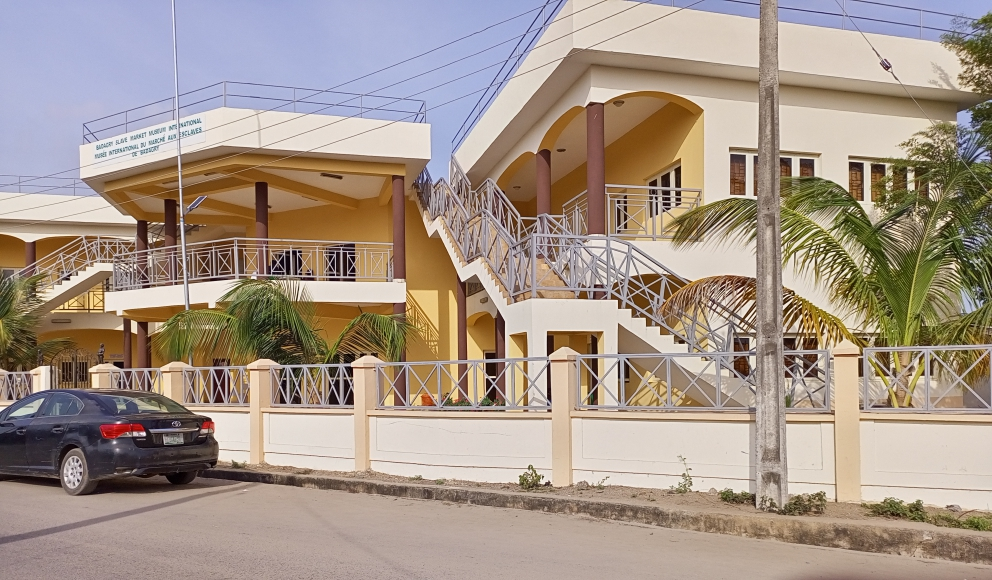
Badagry Slave Market Museum

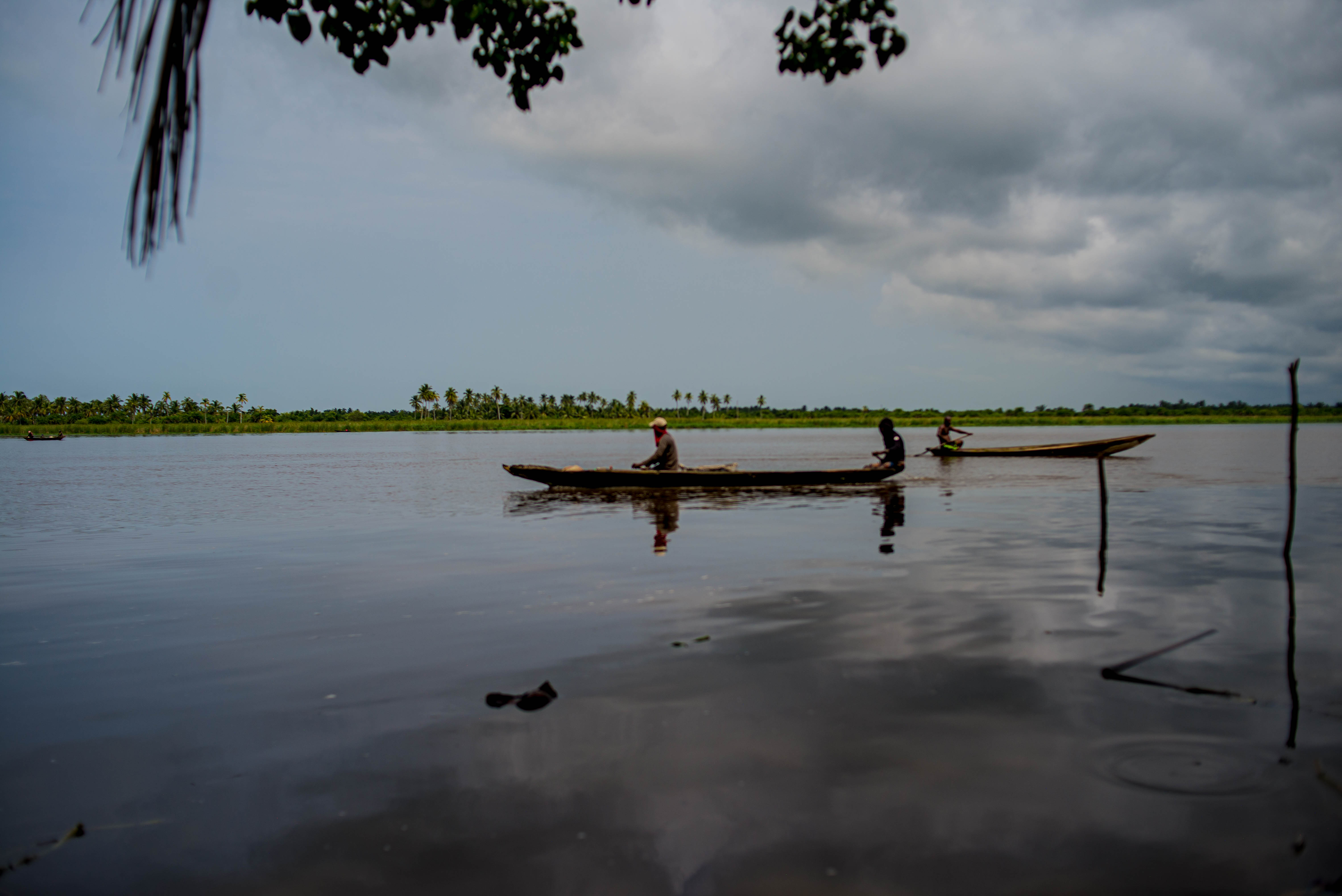
Badagry Lagoon

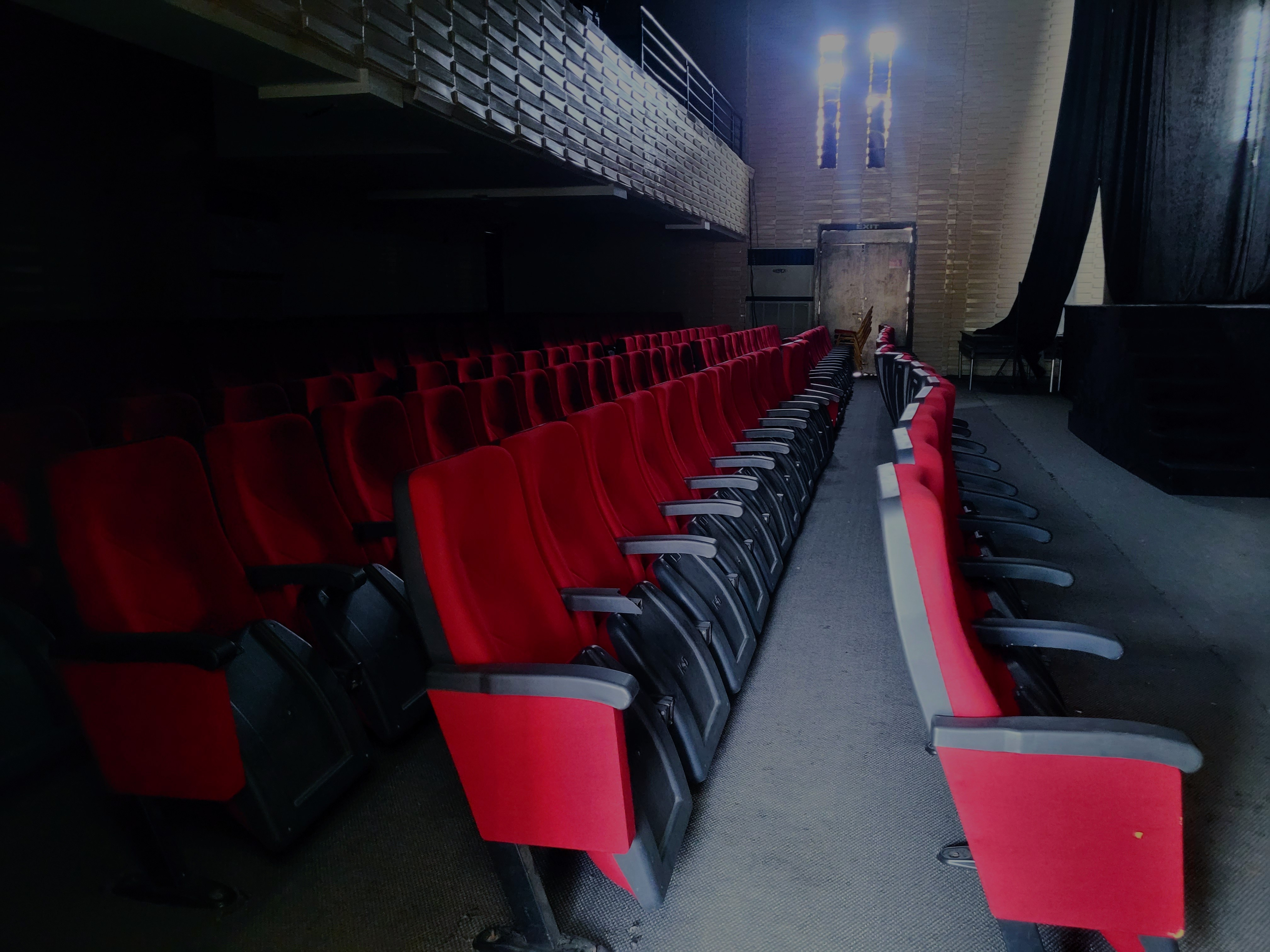
Interior of the Lagos Theatre, Badagry

== See also ==
- Badagry Festival
- Mowo, Badagry
- Velekete Slave Market
