= Tourist attractions in Lagos =

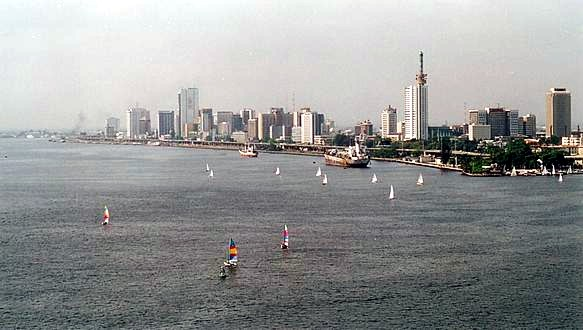
Lagos Island and Harbor

Lagos State in Nigeria is home to several notable tourist sites. Tourism in the state first received government attention by the Military Administration around 1995. The Lagos State Ministry of Tourism, Arts and Culture is charged with responsibility for the state. The state's tourist sites receive thousands of annual visitors, with significant contribution to state GDP.

== Parks and conservation areas ==
=== Lekki Conservation Centre ===
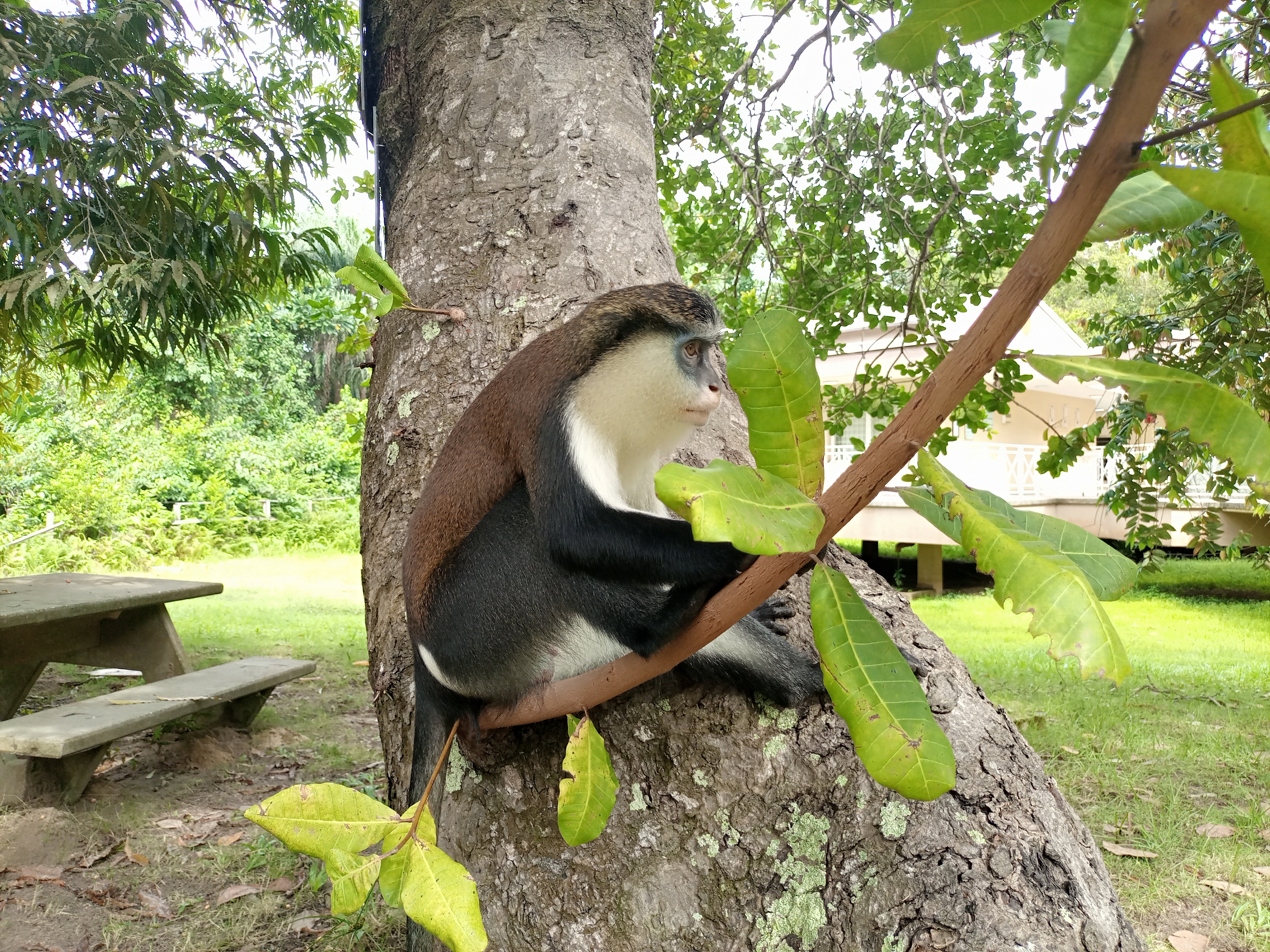
Lekki conservation center

The Lekki Conservation Centre is located in the centre of Lekki. The tourist area, which covers a land area of 78 hectares, is located on the Lekki Peninsula, next to the Lekki Lagoon, and near the Lagos Lagoon. The LCC’s 401-metre long canopy walkway is the longest canopy walkway in Africa. It is a suspended swinging bridge walkway, featuring several types of vegetation and animals.

=== Johnson Jakande Tinubu Park, Ikeja ===
Johnson Jakande Tinubu Park is a 2.2-hectare (240,000 ft^{2}) park in the Alausa area of Ikeja

=== Freedom Park, Lagos ===
Freedom Park is a memorial and leisure park area in the middle of downtown Lagos in Lagos Island, Nigeria; the park symbolizes the transformation of colonial prison to a symbol of freedom. Activities at the park include cultural shows and events, continental and traditional meals, and live music.

== Museums and galleries ==
=== Ikeja ===
==== The Kalakuta Museum ====
Dedicated to legacy of Fela Kuti, curating artifacts related to the life, artistry and activism of the legendary Afrobeat musician. The Kalakuta Museum in Ikeja, Lagos derives much of its authenticity from being located in the actual three-storey house where Fela lived and self-declared to be "The Kalakuta Republic," an independent, self-governing state in defiance of Nigeria's then military dictatorship.

=== Lekki ===
==== Nike Art Gallery ====
Nike Art Gallery is an art gallery in Lekki, Lagos, The gallery is one of the largest collections of indigenous Nigerian artwork, and is currently the largest privately owned art gallery in Africa.

==== Upsidedown house ====
Explore a unique fully furnished colonial era house, which happens to be upside down - with furniture on the ceiling. Located at Landmark recreation area along Water Corporation Road in Victoria Island.

==== Mindscapes Children's Museum ====
Hands-on experiences that promote curiosity and exploration. The museum features exhibits and themed areas designed to stimulate different aspects of learning and play. Located on Michael Olawale Street, Off Admiralty Road, in Lekki.

=== Victoria Island ===
==== National Museum, lagos ====
One of the 65 museums and historical sites managed by Nigerian National Commission for Museums and Monuments. The Lagos National Museum houses a treasure trove of archaeological and ethnographic exhibits ranging from elegant statuary to intricate carvings and more, including the Jemaa Head which is a striking example of terra-cotta craft from the Nok culture and one of the museum's crown jewels. Located in Onikan area.

==== J. Randal Center ====
The J. Randle Centre for Yoruba Culture and History is a new museum in Lagos, Nigeria, dedicated to celebrating and preserving Yoruba culture and history. It's located in the Onikan area, the cultural heart of Lagos Island. The center features a variety of exhibits, including those showcasing Yoruba art, fashion, literature, music and more.

== Beaches and Water Parks ==
Lagos state has over 700 km (430 mi) of Atlantic sandy beaches with about 20 between the West of Badagry and East of Lekki. They include:

=== Landmark Leisure Beach ===
The Landmark Leisure Beach is a beach that is located in Lagos, Lagos State Nigeria. It is at numbers 3 & 4 Water Corporation Road, VI, Lagos. The beach is open to the public every day. It employed paid lifeguards who watch over the beach and have rescued many people from drowning.

=== Other Beaches ===
- Atlas Cove, Apapa
- Bar Beach, Victoria Island
- Elegushi Beach
- Tarkwa Bay Beach
- Eleko Beach
- Topo Island, Badagry.
- Coconut Beach, Badagry

=== Water parks ===
Giwa Gardens in the Sangotedo district is a water park that claims to be the largest in West Africa.

== Cultural, Heritage, Historical Sites and Trails ==
=== Ikorodu ===
- Ikorodu Cultural Heritage Trail is a cultural and historical journey through the rich cultural landscape of the historic town of Ikorodu, showcasing key places, people, events and timelines.

=== Badagry ===
The historic town of Badagry was an important slave port through which thousands of slaves annually (millions cumulatively) were dispatched to Europe and the Americas during the Transatlantic Slave Trade.

- Badagry Heritage Museum Situated in what was built in 1863 as the British colonial government's District Office, in The museum contains one of the most comprehensive exhibition and historical collections of artifacts about slavery in Badagry from about 1473 to about 1888."
- Seriki Williams Abass Slave Museum The Seriki Williams Abasss Slave Museum is a historical site located originally established in the early 1840s, serving both as the compound of Chief Seriki Williams Abass (a slave merchant) and as a place for holding slaves during the transatlantic slave trade.
- Mobee Palace. The Mobee Family House and Relics Museum houses the relics that portraying the family's involvement with the slave trade.
- The Velekete Slave Market was established in 1502 by Dutch settlers and slave merchants.
- The Point of No Return, located on Gberefu Island, was the gateway for transporting slaves off the coast of Badagry to Europe and America.
- The First Storey Building in Nigeria, built between 1842 and 1845 by Reverend Henry Townsend of the Church Missionary Society (CMS) and served as home of Samuel Ajayi Crowther, the first African CMS Bishop.
- The Agia Tree, where Christmas was reportedly first celebrated in Nigeria by Reverend Freeman and Reverend Townsend on 25 December 1842.
