= Badagry Heritage Museum =

Slave Museum in Nigeria

Coordinates: 6.4183°N 2.8901°E

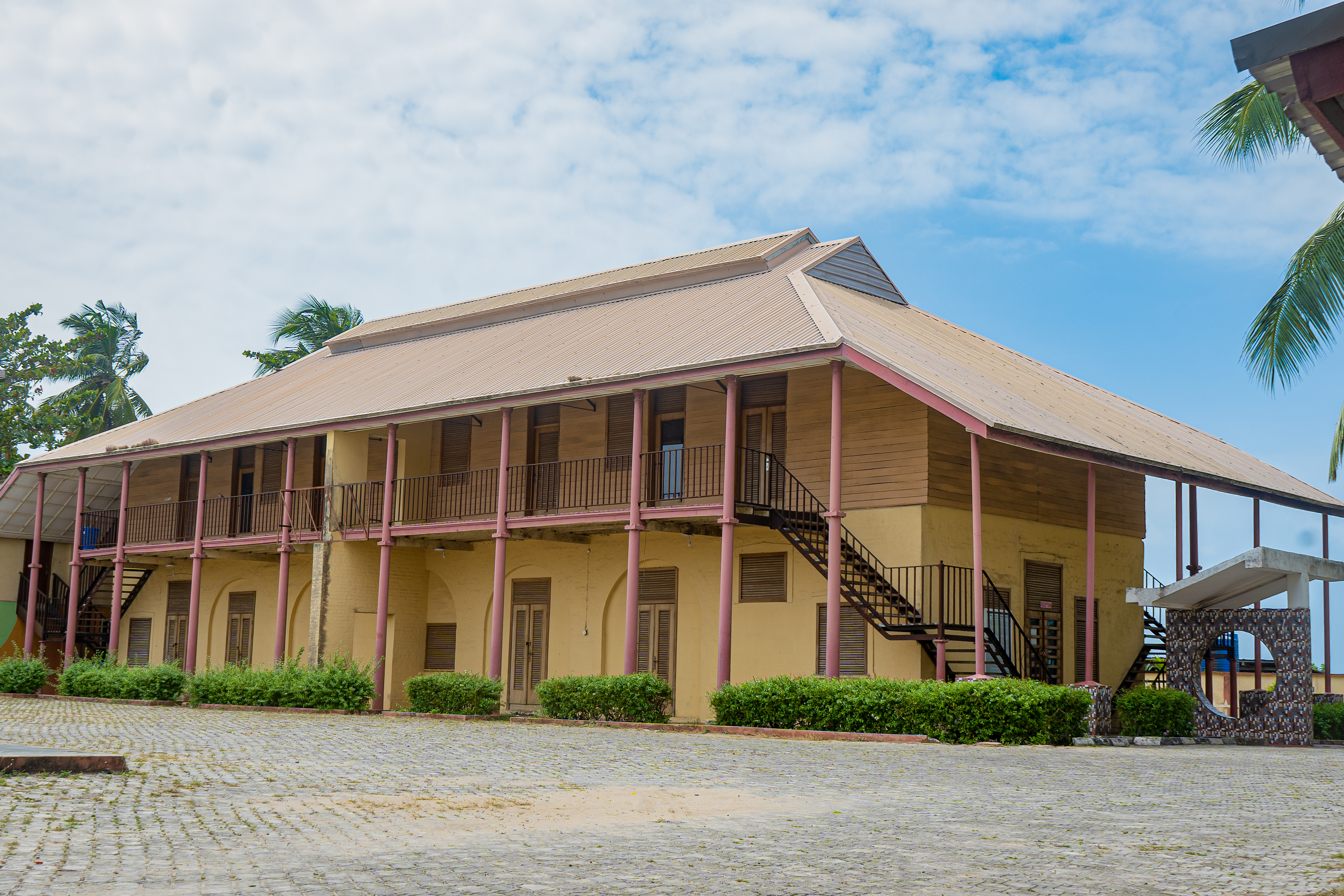
- Badagry Heritage Museum
- Established: 22 August 2002
- Location: Badagry, Nigeria
- Type: Historical museum

Badagry Heritage Museum is a museum in Badagry, Nigeria that is housed in the District Officer's Office built in 1863 by the British colonial government. The museum is managed by the Nigerian Cultural Commission.

== History ==
The museum is primarily housed in the former administrative building constructed for the British district officer in 1863. It was converted into a museum in 2002 on the instruction of then-governor of Lagos State, Bola Ahmed Tinubu. The museum was inaugurated on 22 August 2002, as part of the Black Heritage Festival.

The Museum is divided into 8 galleries which follow the history of the slave trade. The introductory gallery focuses on the establishment of the slave trade in Badagry, while the next five galleries (capture, transportation, material culture, resistance, and industry) include objects like manacles, shackles, and replicas of slave ships. The seventh gallery focuses on the forced integration of enslaved people into the societies they were transported to, while the final gallery covers abolitionist movements and the continuation of slavery after its legal abolition. The museum also includes modern art which reflects on the history of enslavement.

At the front of the museum is a statue which depicts an enslaved man and woman standing back-to-back, breaking free of the chains around their wrists and ankles. The statue commemorates the end of the Atlantic slave trade in Nigeria.

== Gallery ==
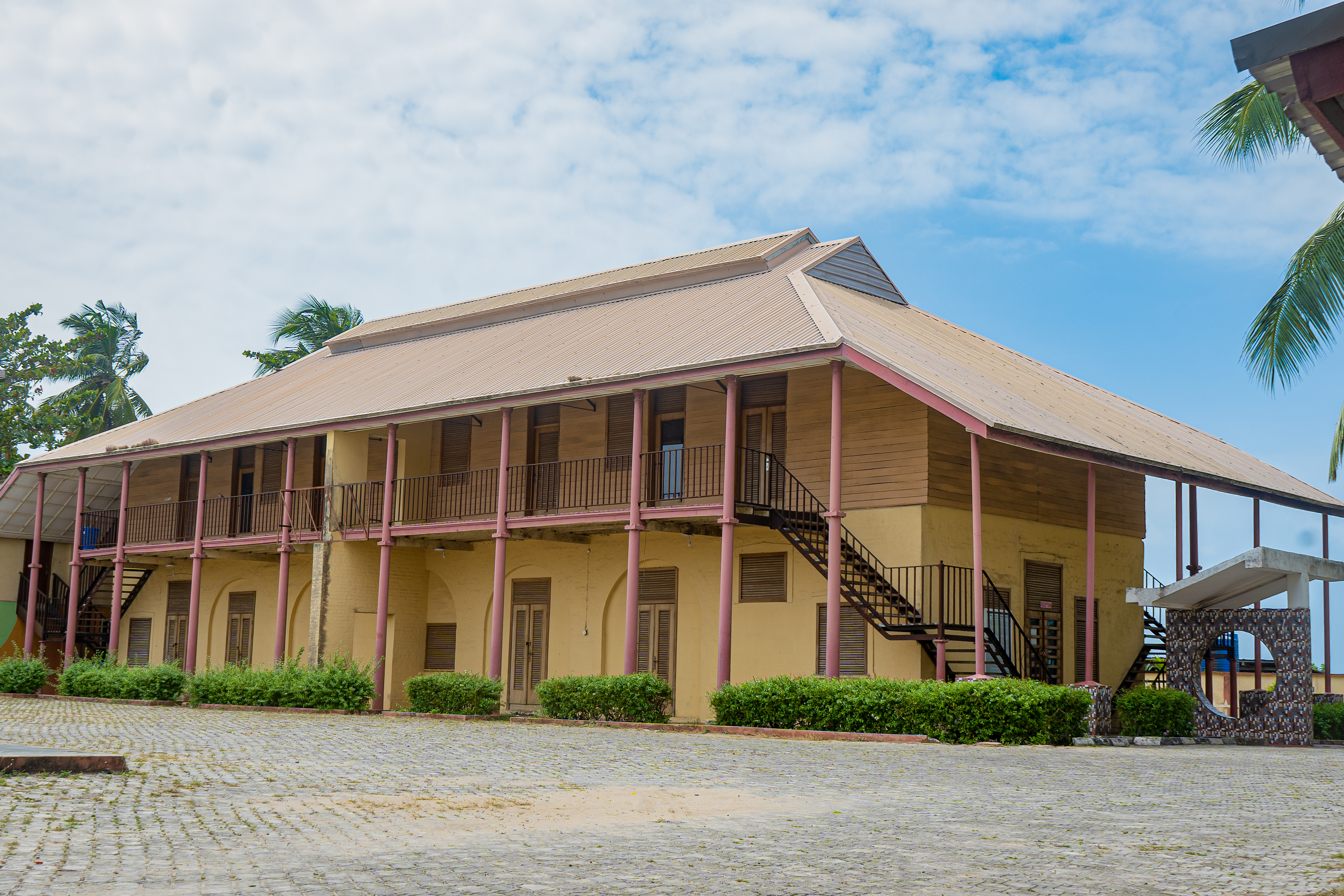
Badagry Slave Museum

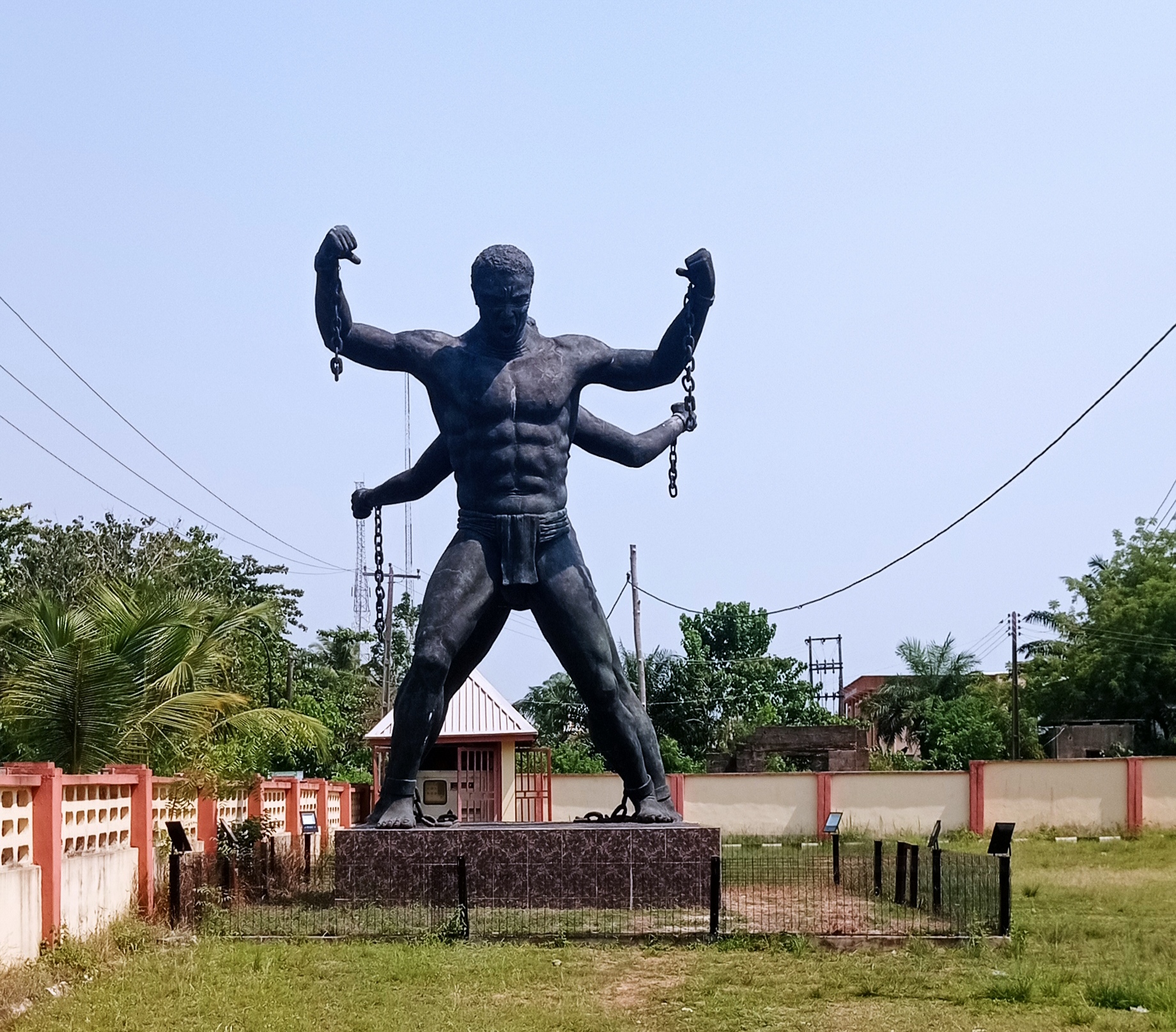
Freedom Statue at Badagry Heritage Museum

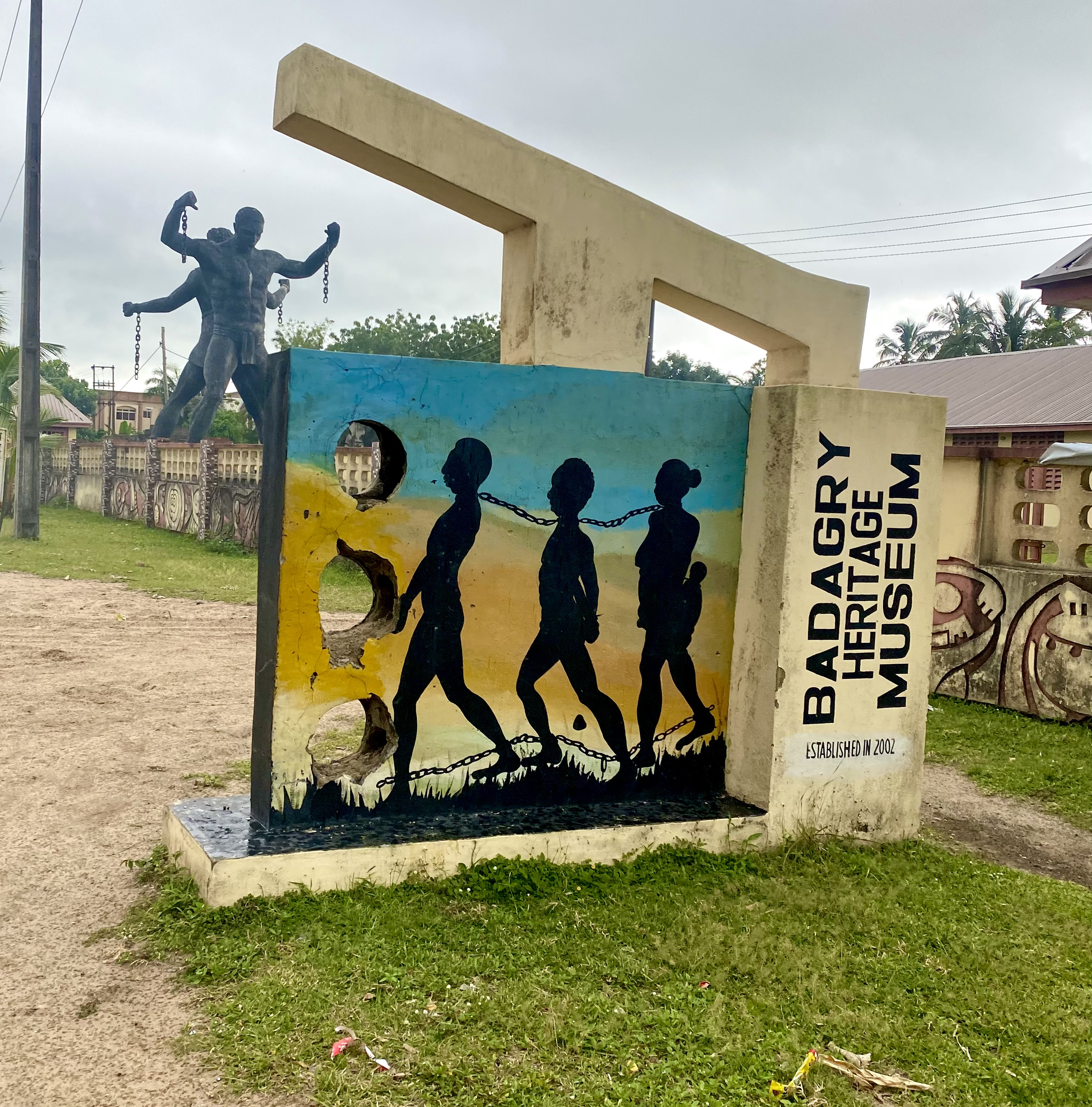
Signpost at the Badagry Heritage Museum

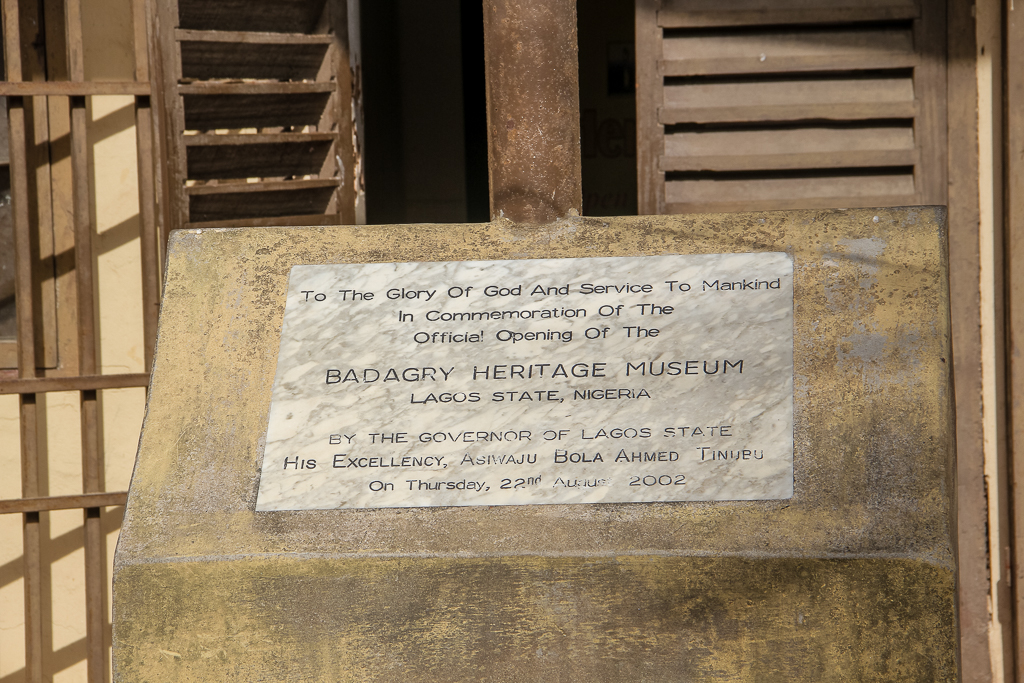
Museum opening plaque

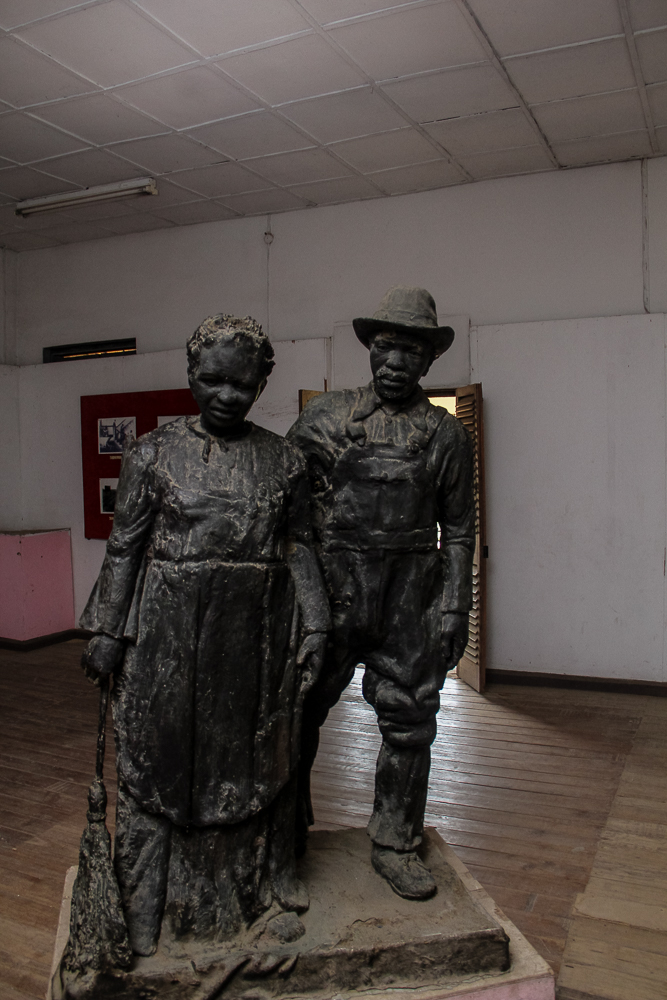

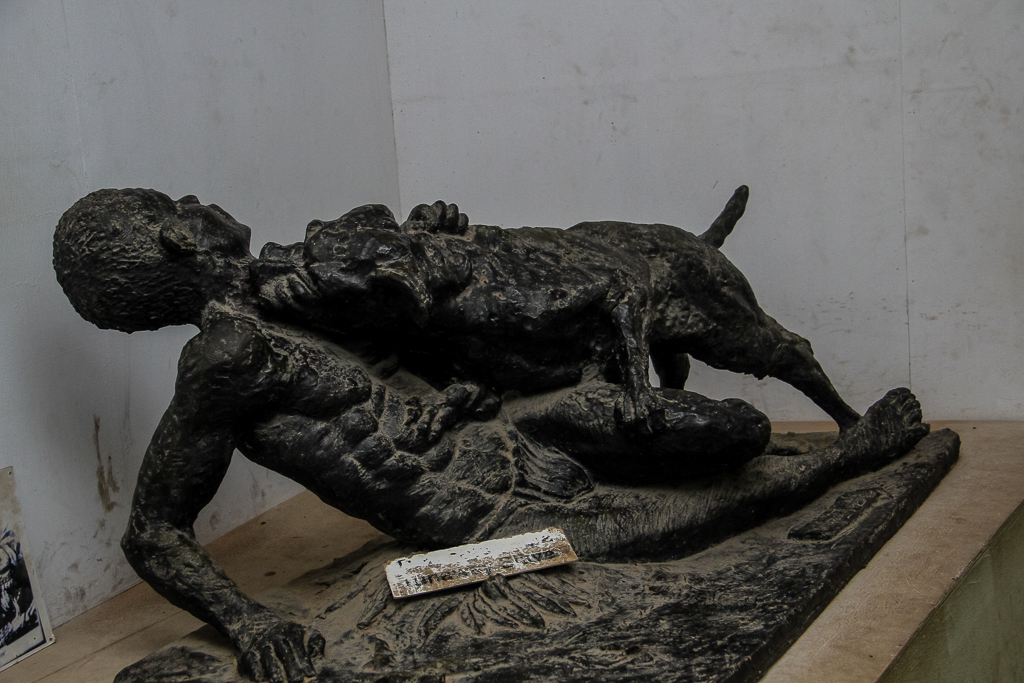

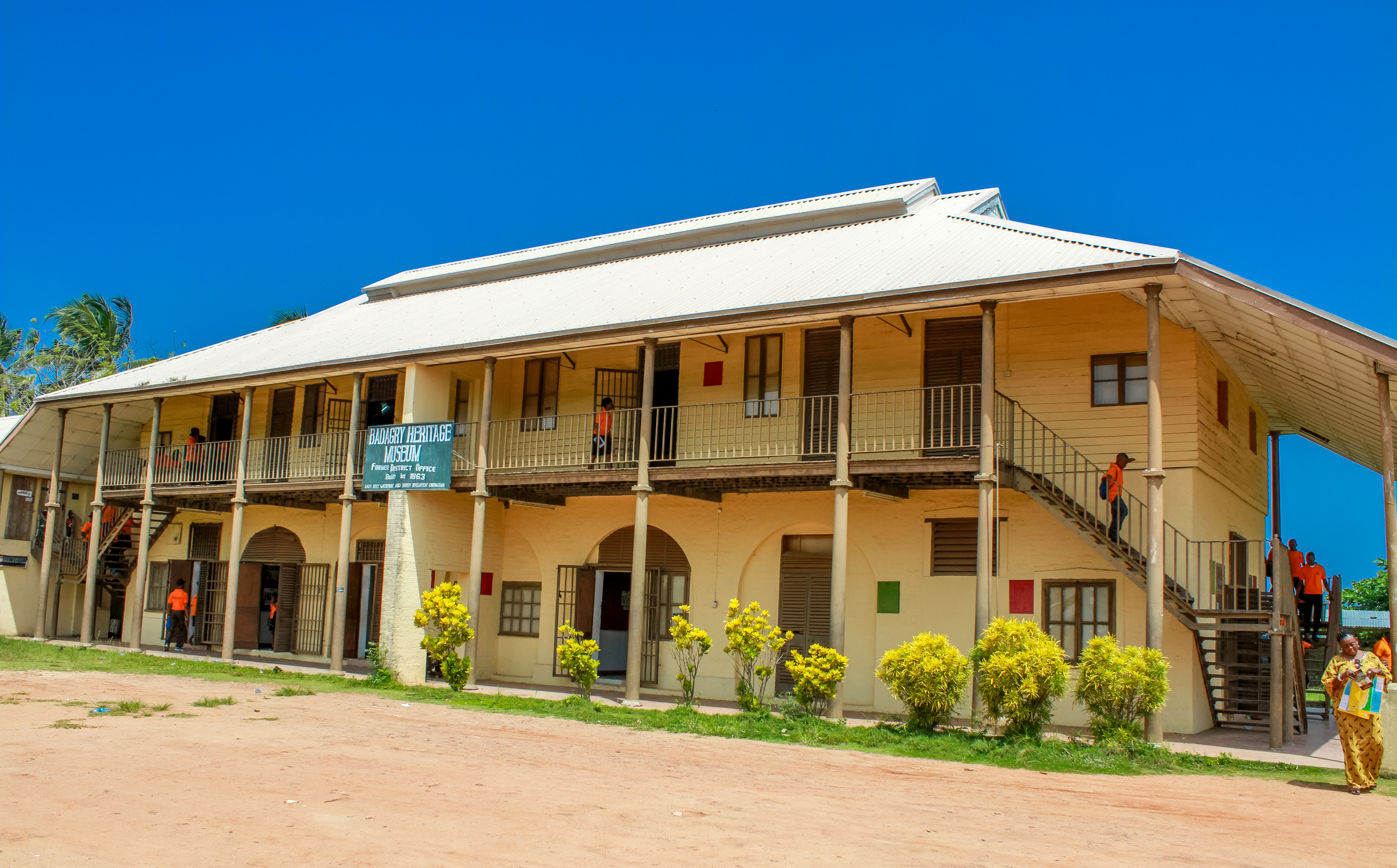

== See also ==
- Mobee Royal Family Slave Relics Museum
- Seriki Williams Abass Slave Museum
- Velekete Slave Market
