= Seriki Williams Abass Slave Museum =

Nigerian museum

Coordinates: 6.4120°N 2.8841°E

Seriki William Abass Museum
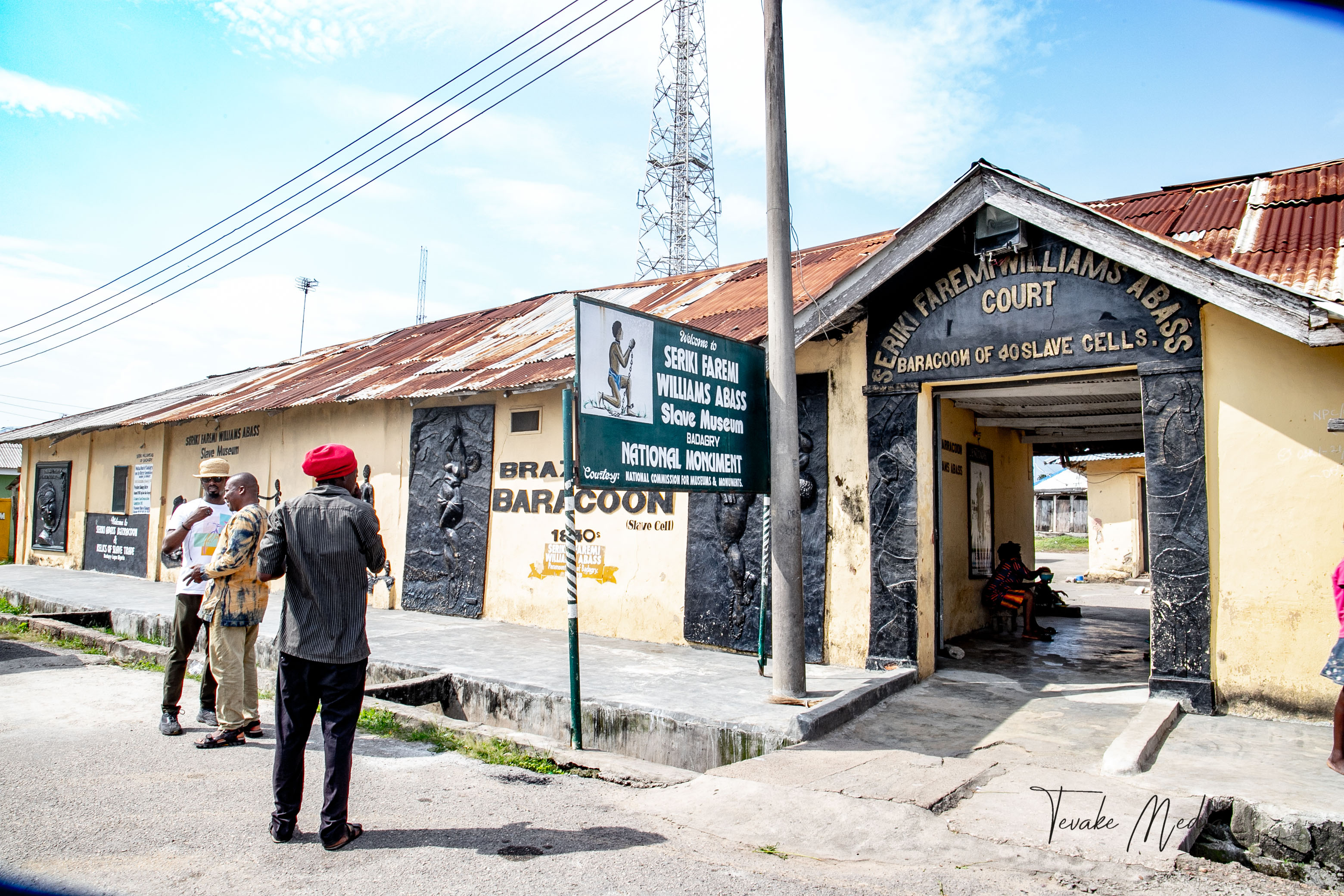
- Established: 1840
- Location: Lagos
- Type: Slave Museum

The Seriki Williams Abass Slave Museum is a historical site located in Badagry, Lagos State, Nigeria. Established in the early 1840s, serving both as the compound of Seriki Williams Abass and a place for holding slaves during the transatlantic slave trade.

== Background ==
The museum is located in a 19th-century slave barracoon, a structure built to confine enslaved people before their forced transportation, which is also the former residency of Chief Seriki Williams Abass, originally named Ifaremilekun Fagbami (born around 1835 in Orile, Ogun State).

In 2003, the Nigerian government designated the site a national monument, recognizing its historical significance. It was later converted into a museum to document the impact of slavery in Nigeria and educate visitors on the events that took place there.

The museum preserves original architectural elements of the barracoon. It also houses a collection of historical artifacts, such as chains and shackles used to restrain captives; documents and records detailing Badagry's involvement in the slave trade; maps of slave-trade routes, illustrating the movement of enslaved Africans; and photographs and illustrations related to the era.

== Gallery ==
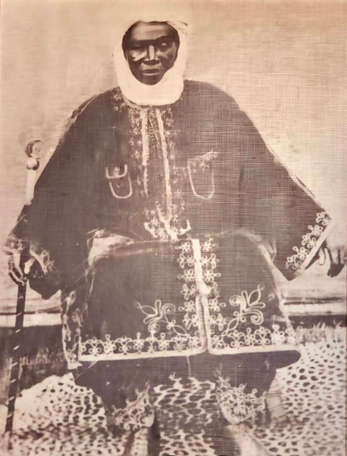
Seriki Williams Abass

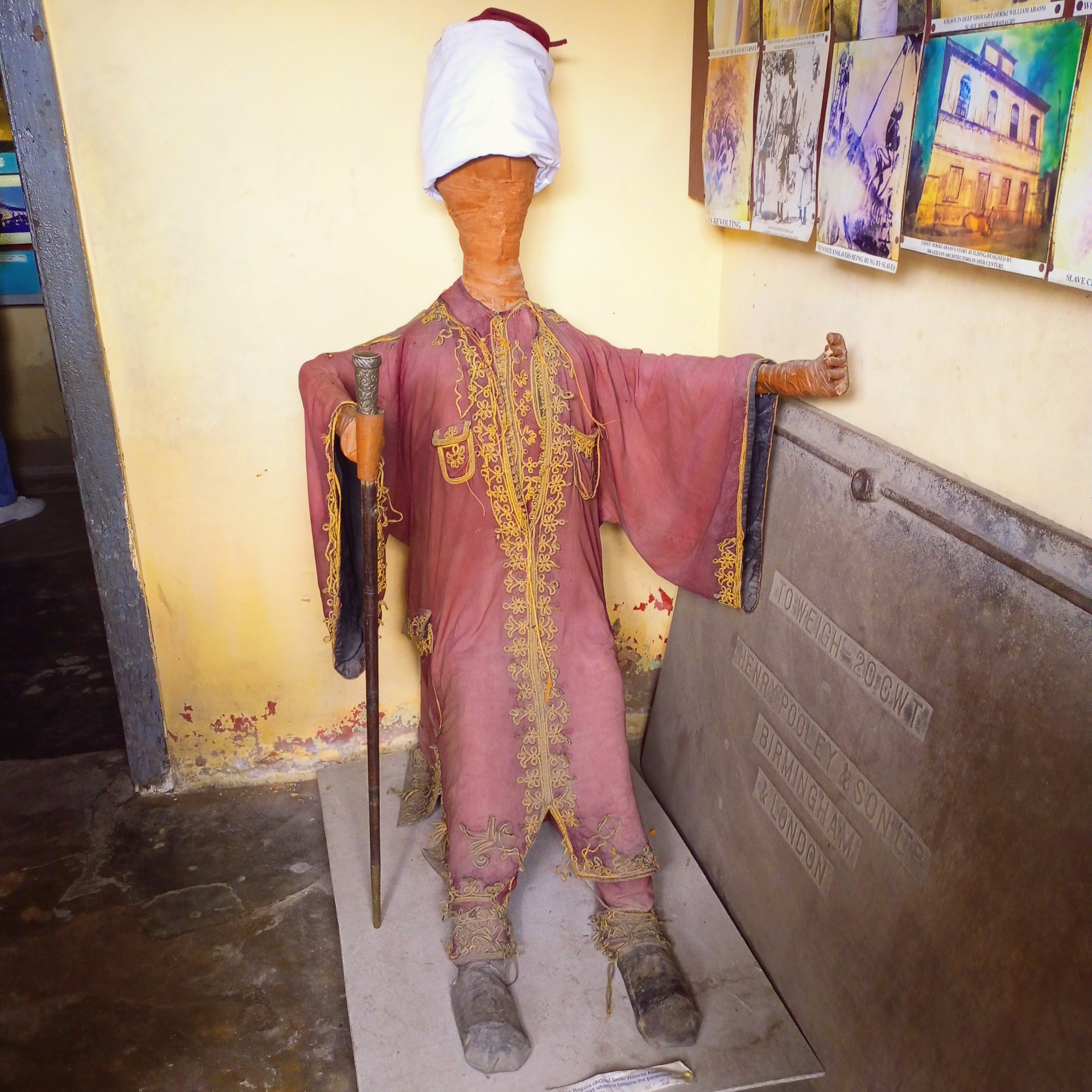
Regalia worn by Seriki Williams Abass

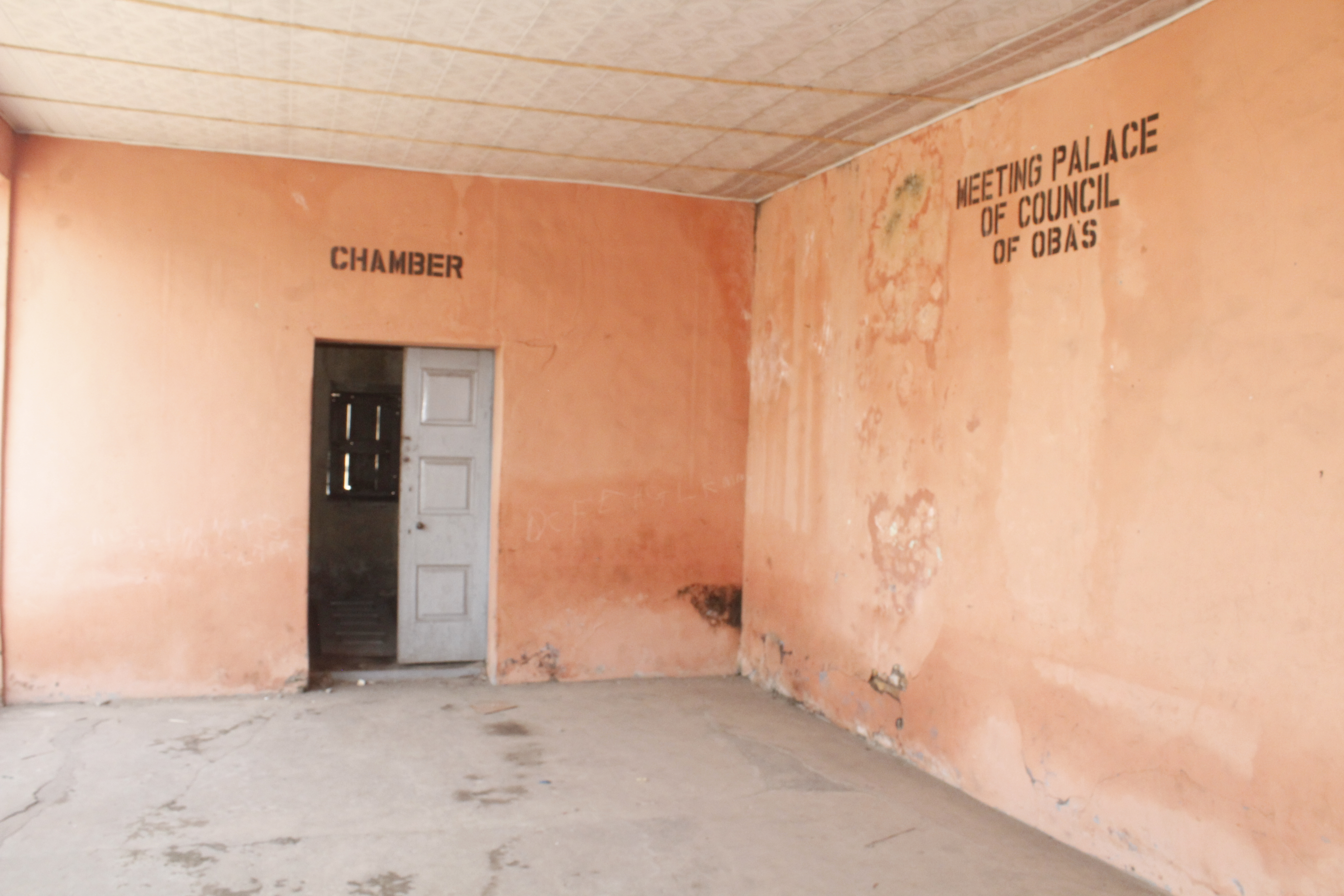
Chamber of the Brazilian Barracoon

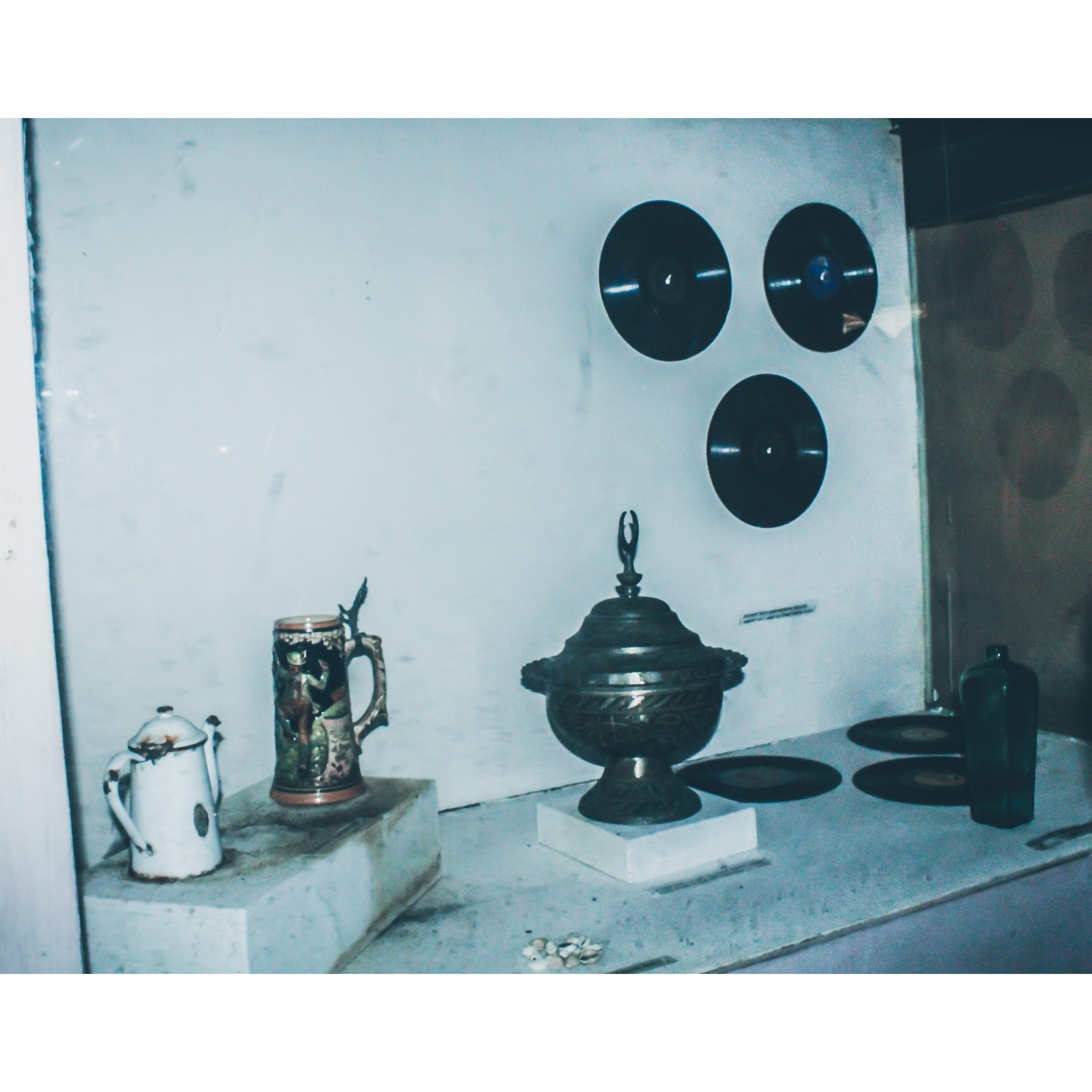
Items gifted to Seriki Williams Abass

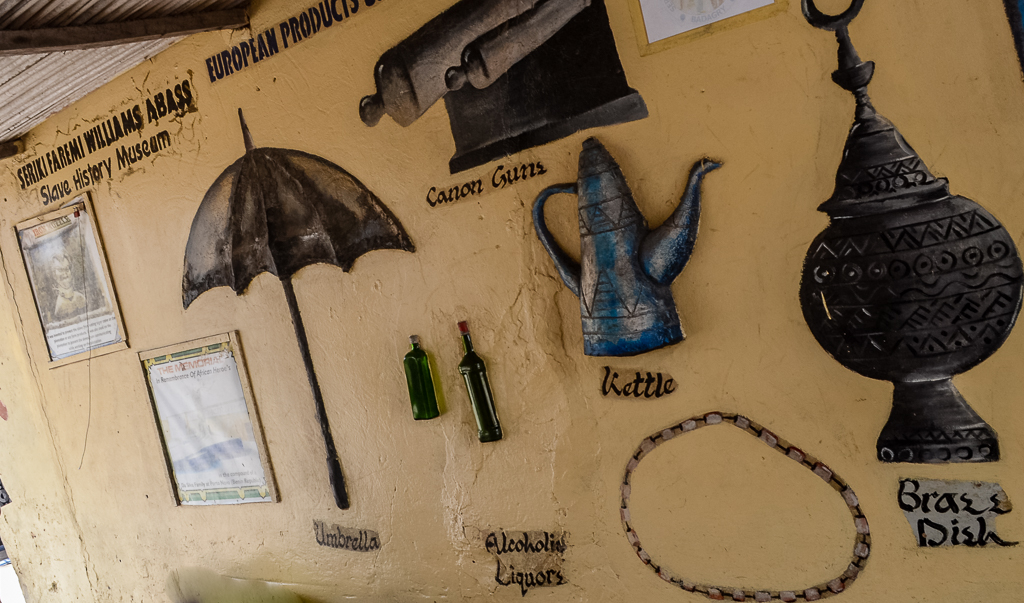
European products exchanged for slaves

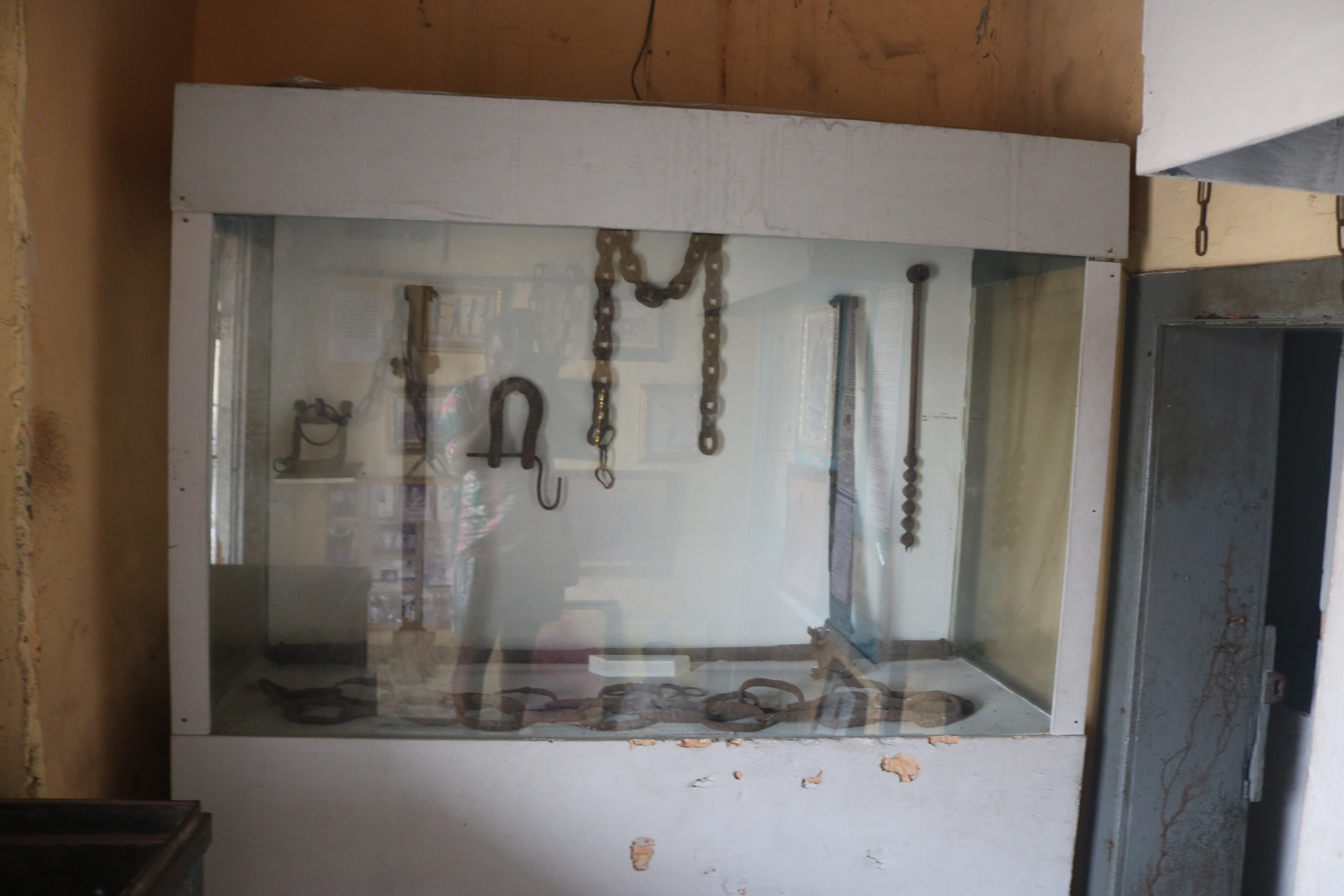
Relics on display inside the museum

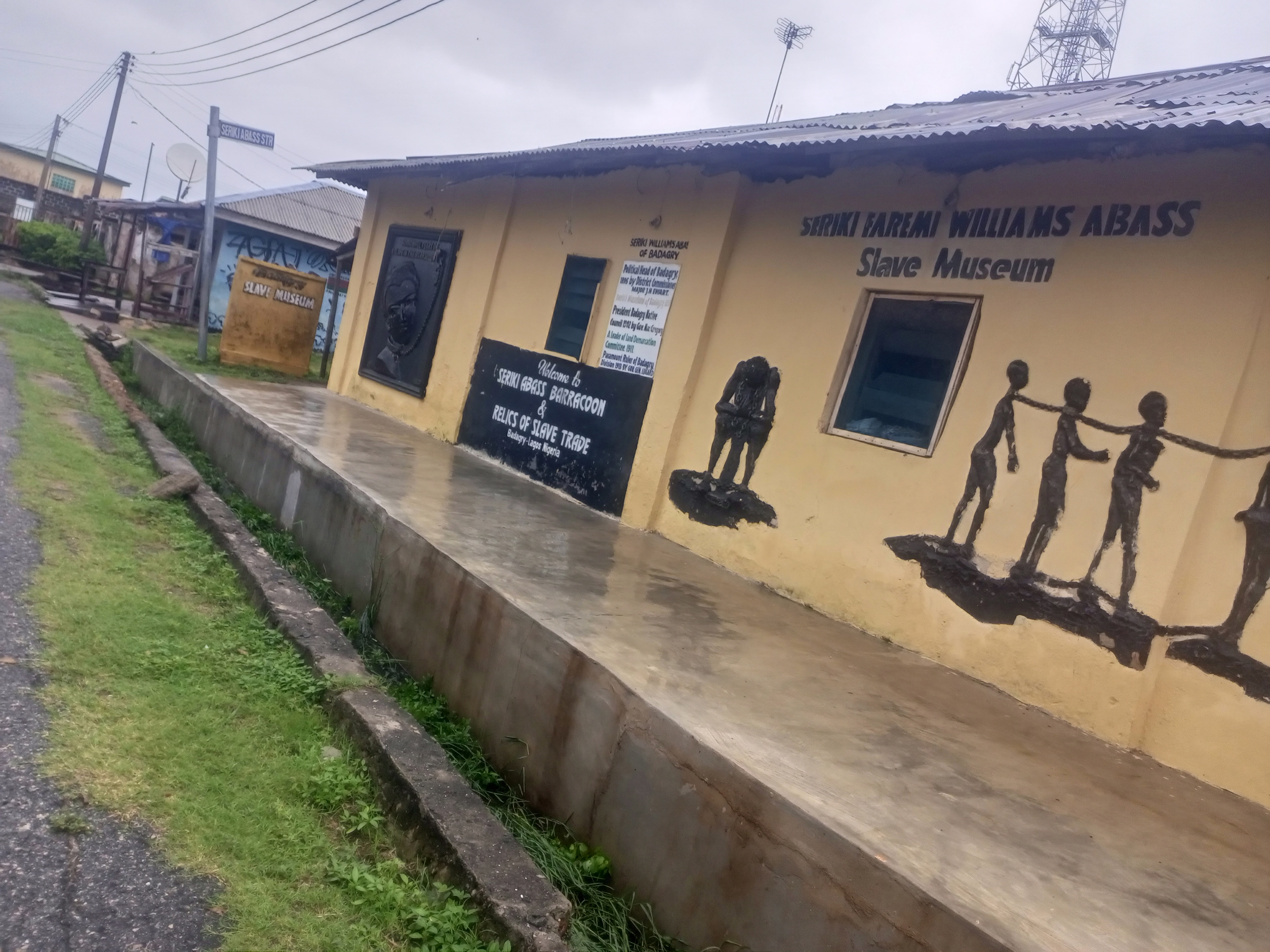
Brazilian Barracoon

== See also ==
- Badagry Heritage Museum
- Mobee Royal Family Slave Relics Museum
- Velekete Slave Market
