= Velekete =

Deity and goddess of the sea in the mythology of the people of Badagry

Vlekete or Verekete is a deity and goddess of the sea in the mythology of the people of Badagry in Nigeria. The Velekete Shrine and Velekete Slave Market are named after her.
