= Seriki Williams Abass =

Nigerian slave merchant

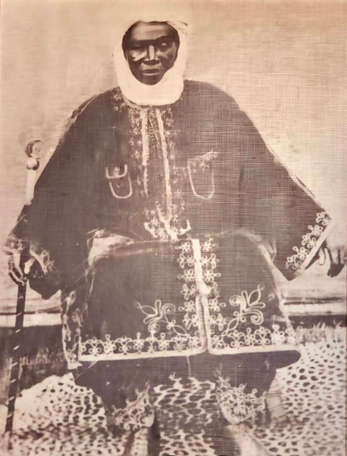
- Born: Ifaremilekun Fagbemi c. 1835; West Africa
- Died: 11 June 1919; Nigeria
- Occupations: Slave trader, later a government-appointed leader
- Known for: Slave trading, leadership in Badagry

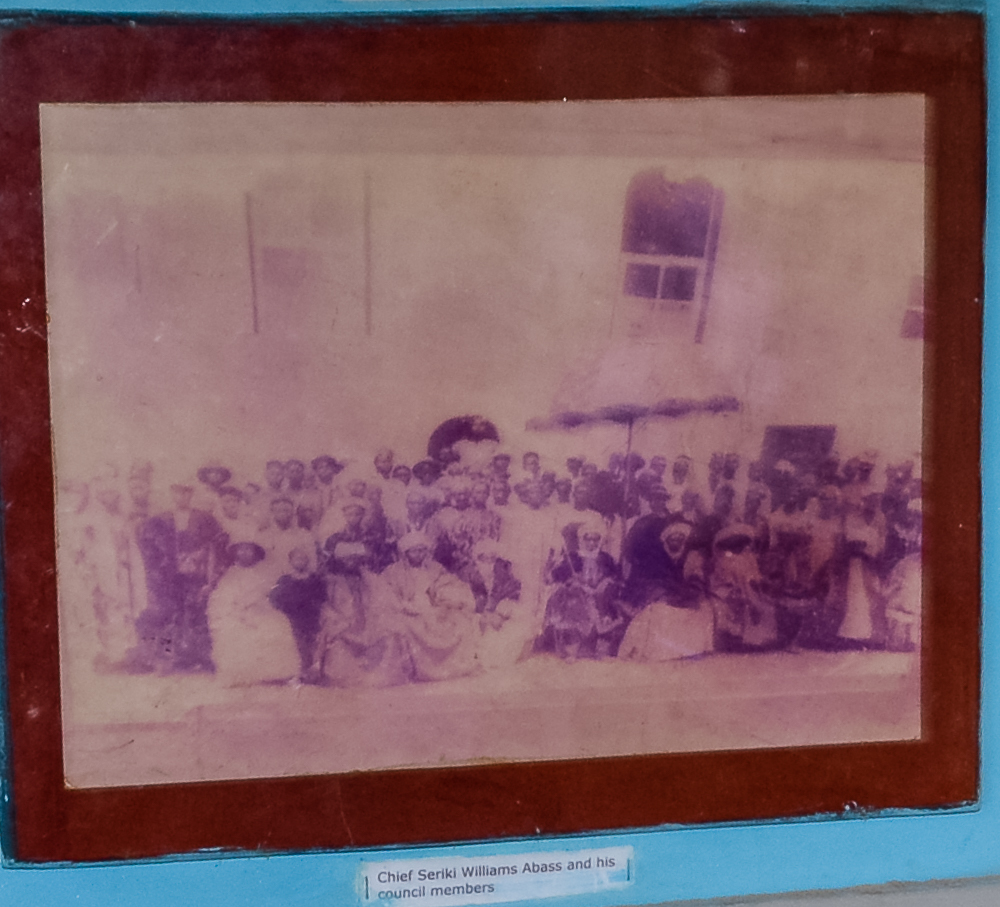
Group photo of Seriki Williams Abass and his council members

Seriki Williams Abass (born Ifaremilekun Fagbemi; c. 1835 – 11 June 1919) was a slave merchant in present-day southern Nigeria during the 19th century who became the "Paramount Ruler" of Badagry within the indirect rule structure established by the British.

== Life ==
Born Ifaremilekun Fagbemi in Joga-Orile, a town in Ilaro, Ogun State, Abass was captured as a slave by a Dahomean slave merchant called Abass^{a} during one of the Dahomey–Egba clashes. He was later sold to a certain Brazilian slave dealer called Williams who took Abass to Brazil as a domestic servant and taught him how to read and write in Dutch, English, Spanish and Portuguese languages.

He returned to Nigeria on the condition of working with Mr. Williams as a slave trade business partner. Seriki first settled at Ofin, Isale-Eko in the Colony of Lagos before he relocated to Badagry in the 1830s. In collaboration with his European partners and patrons, he built and maintained a 40-room Barracoon, small rooms in which captured slaves were held prior to being sold to European slave merchants and shipped away across the Atlantic, on the Lagoon's shore in Badagry. Richard Lander and other European explorers wrote travelogues and exploratory accounts describing the barbaric operations of the barracoon, or "slave factories" in Badagry.

Believed to have married 128 wives and had 144 children, his slave trade business thrived massively while in Badagry and soon became the first person in the Egbado division of Badagry to own a lorry, the "Seriki Ford" he bought in 1919 to ply the Abeokuta–Aiyetoro Road. His wealth brought him respect and earned him various political positions including "Seriki Musulumi" (roughly Chief of the Muslim Faithful) of Western Yorubaland following his induction in 1897 by Chief lmam Yusuf. He was later appointed as the "Paramount Ruler" of Badagry and the Western District in 1913 through the Indirect Rule.

== Death ==
He died on 11 June 1919, and was buried within his estate in Badagry. The 40-room barracoon and his cenotaph are currently maintained as a slave trade heritage museum.

== Note ==
^a It was a norm that slaves bear the same name as their master.
