= Velekete Slave Market =

Market located in Badagry, Lagos State, Nigeria

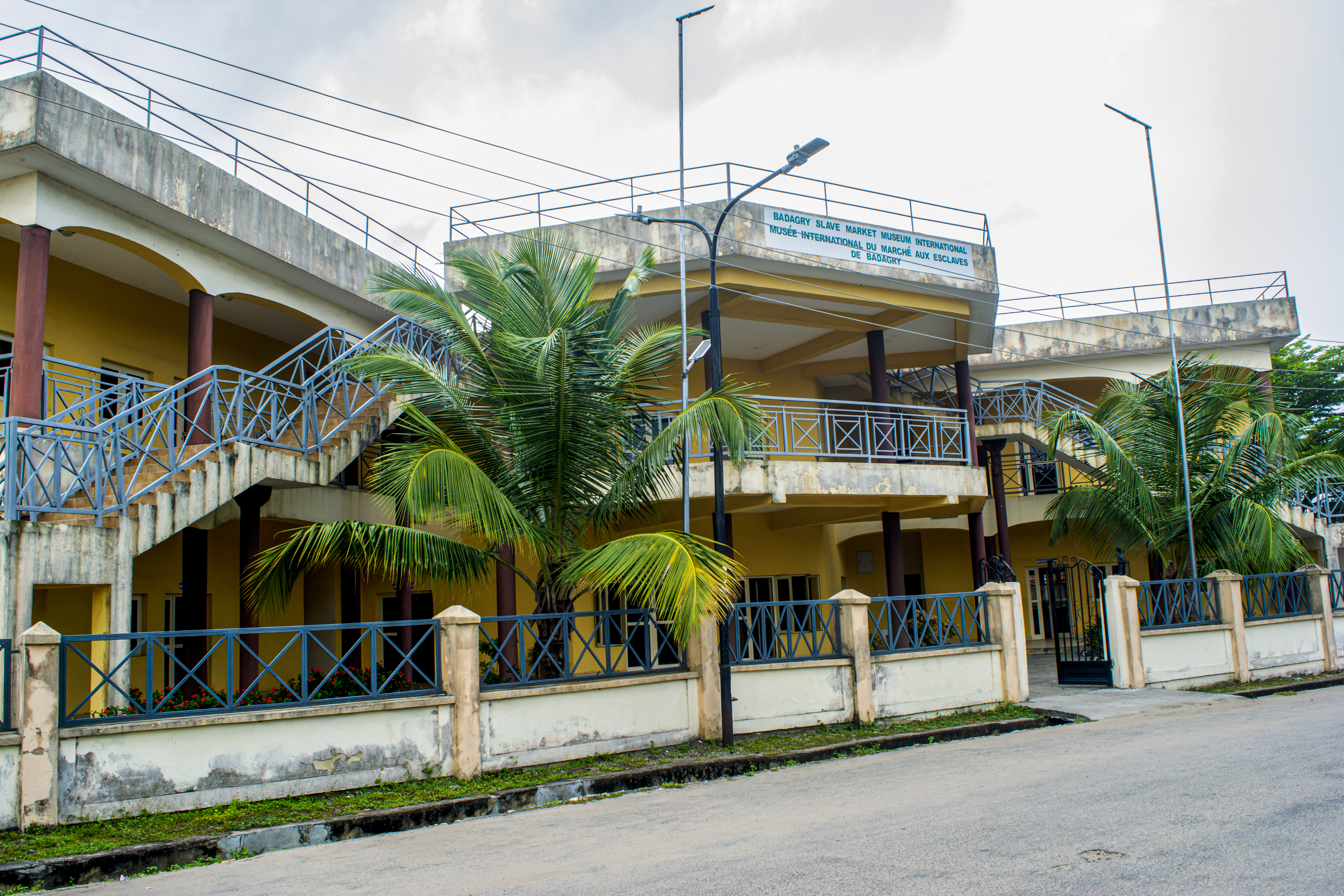
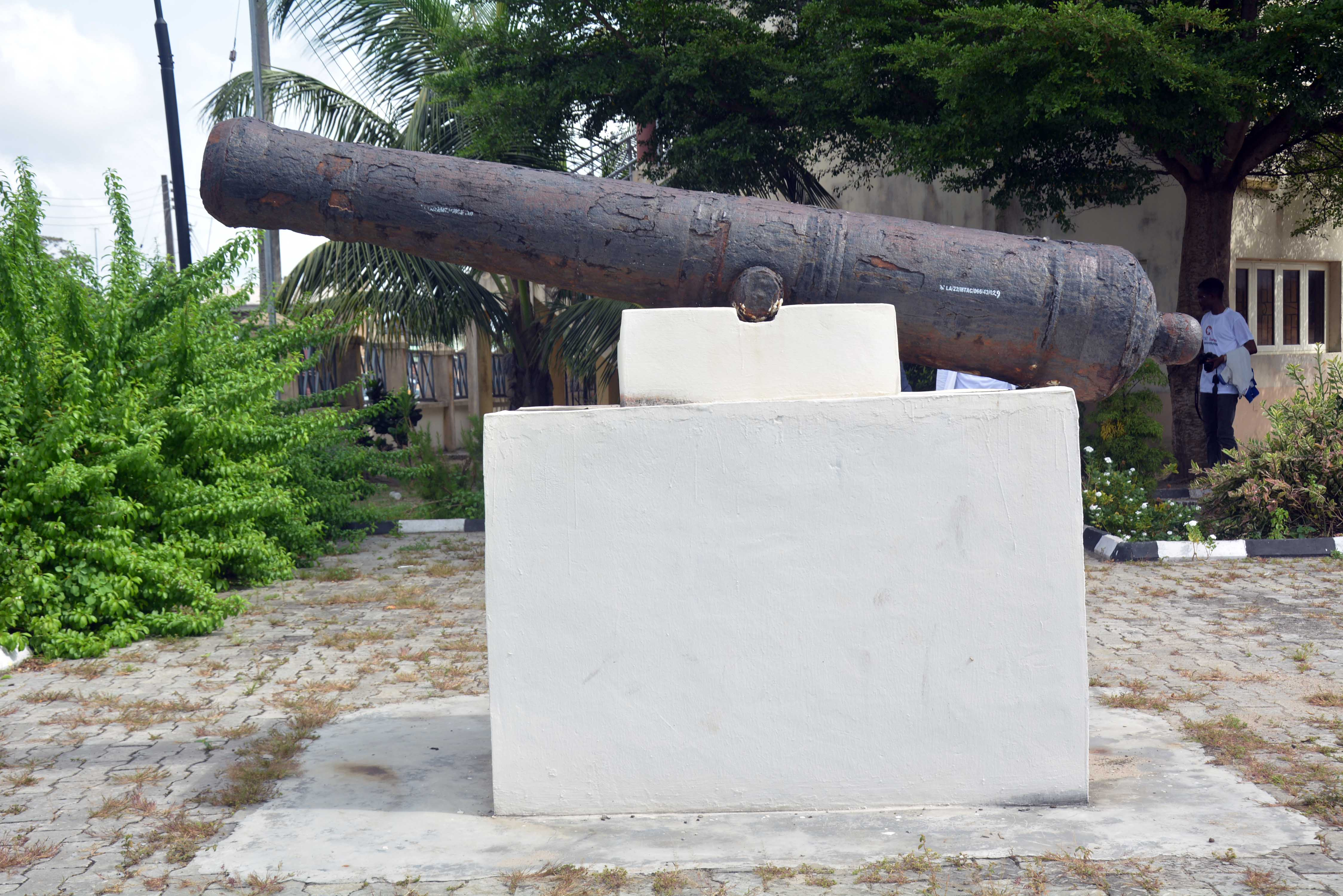
Velekete Slave Market Museum
- Established: 1502
- Location: Badagry, Lagos State, Nigeria
- Type: Museum

The Vlekete Slave Market is a former slave market located in Badagry, Lagos State. Established in 1502 and named after the Vlekete deity, the goddess of the ocean and wind the market was significant during the Atlantic slave trade in Badagry, as it served as a business point where African middlemen sold slaves to European slave merchants, thus making it one of the most populous slave markets in West Africa.

== Background ==
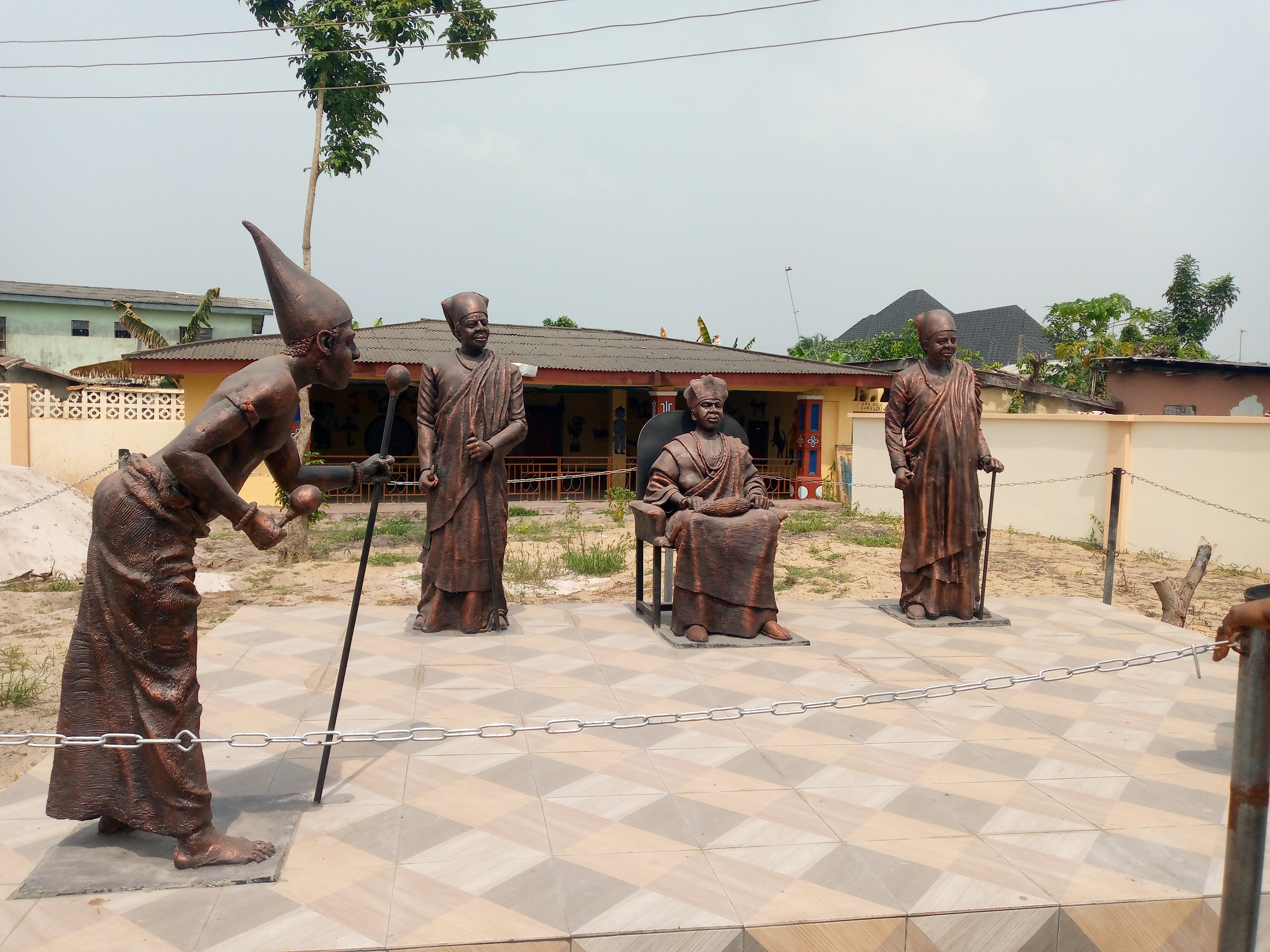
Monument depicting slave merchants

The settlement of Hendrik Hertog, a Dutch trader in Badagry who was locally known as Yovo Huntokonu sowed the seed for the establishment of the Vlekete Slave Market. He acquired land from the local people and turned the town into a trading post that was beneficial to the Chiefs of the land as more Europeans came to exchange their goods with what the Africans had. The slave trade boom started when the trading partners understood how lucrative it was due to high demand of workers for plantations in other lands. The Vlekete Shrine make it easy to becomes a Slaves markets on the account of the ritual activity in the place before the slaves trade began in Africa.

== Activities ==
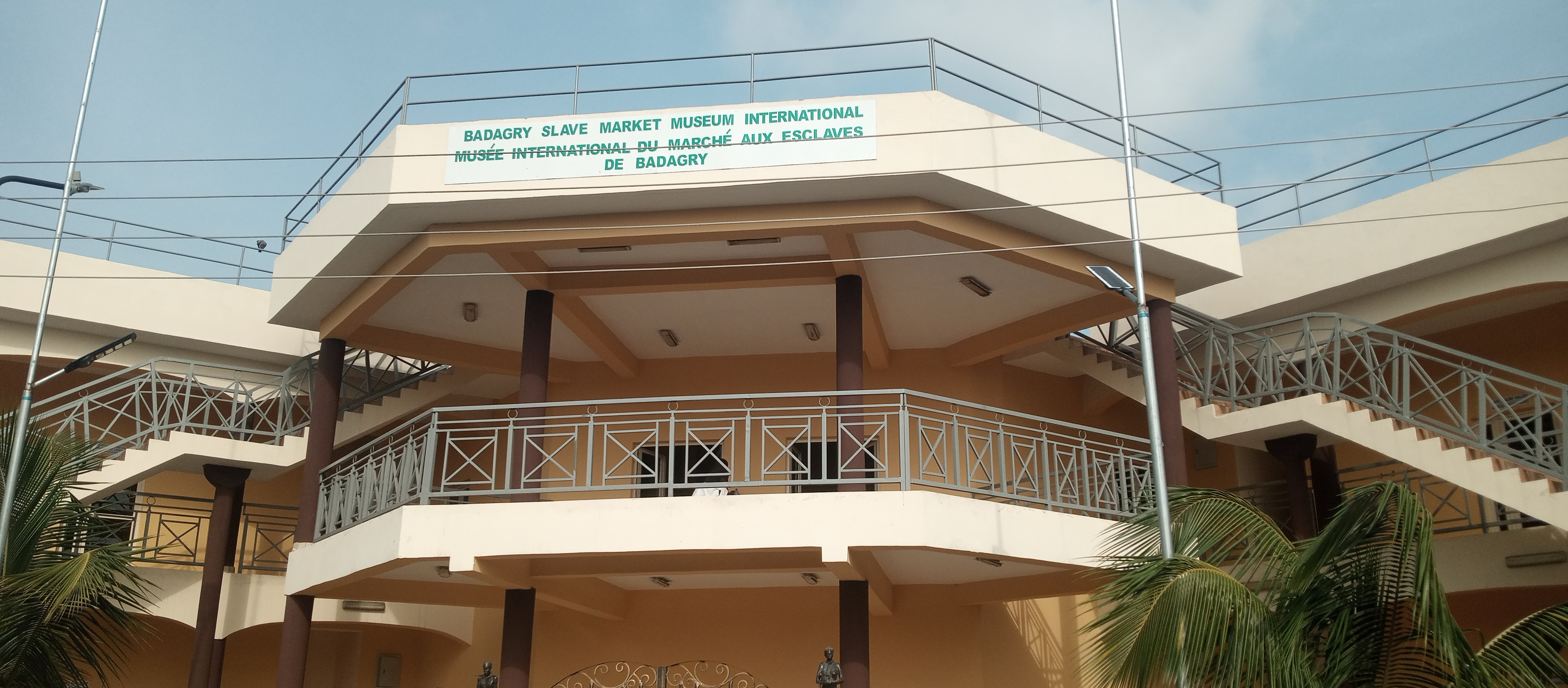
Badagry Slave Market Museum

In 1805, Scipio Vaughan who was a native of the Owu Kingdom, was captured by European trans-Atlantic slave trade and was taken to this Vlekete Slave Market in Badagry together with other captured slaves before he was shipped in a slave ship to America. Slaves were also brought from as far as present day Abia State, Nigeria to Vlekete Slave market. They were first kept in cells constructed adjacent to the market. The market sold slaves every five days. The slaves were exchanged for whiskey, gunpowder, cannon, ceramic plates, mirrors, umbrellas, iron wares and other articles.

In recent times, the market has become part of the tourist attractions for those who wish to further understand how the slave trade was carried out in parts of central West Africa alongside;

- the Mobee Family House and Relics Museum which houses the relics that portray how the family was involved in the slave trade,
- the Gberefu Island which was the path to the Point of No Return and where it is estimated that up to 500,000 boys, girls, young men and women who were captured for slavery passed through,
- the Spirit Attenuation Well from which the captives were made the drink the liquid and recite promises of non-revolt on the slave ships and to forget their origins, and:
- Point of No Return where the captives were formally handed over to Europeans who led them into the slave ships.

== Gallery ==
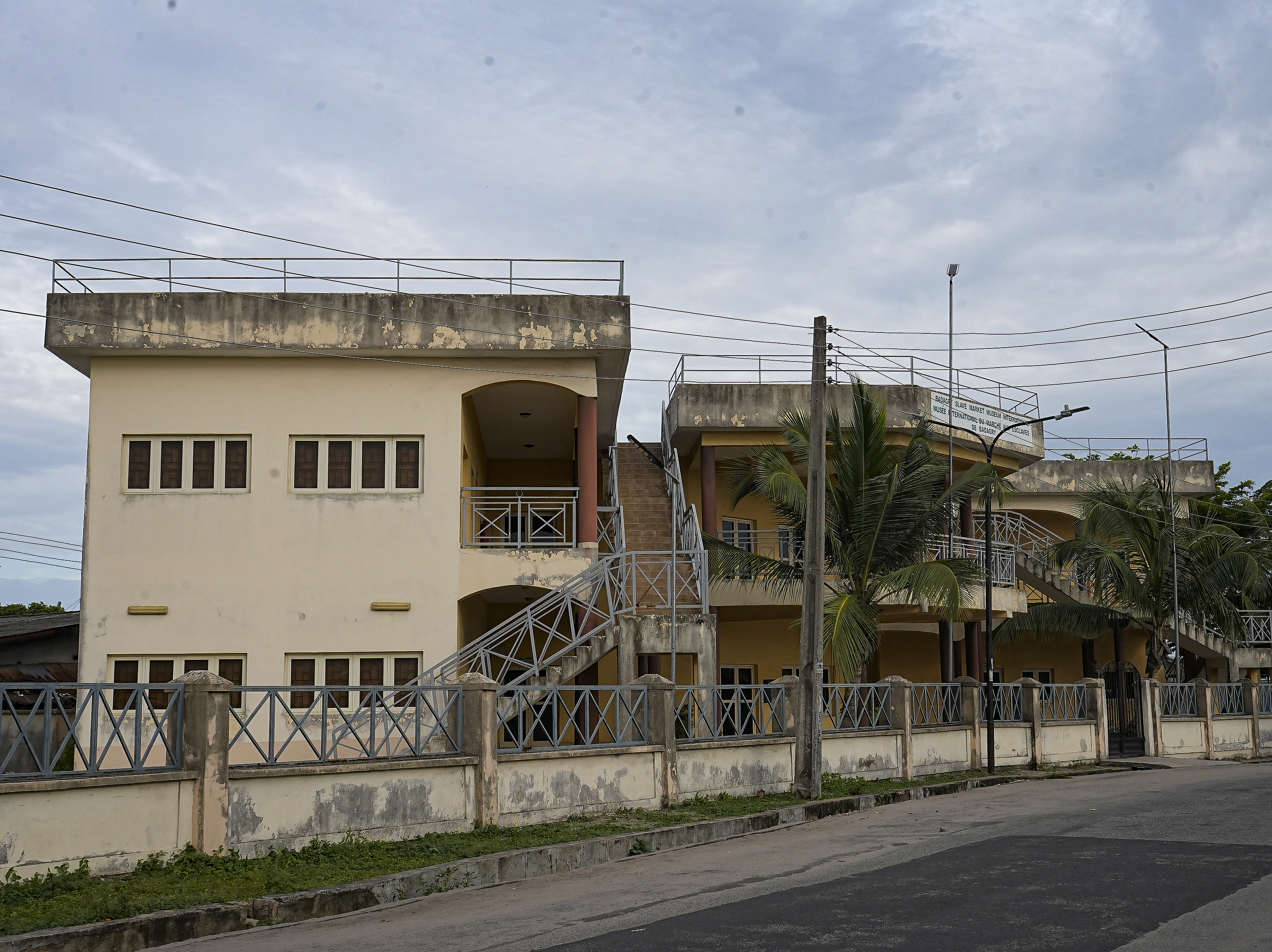
Vlekete Slave Market Museum

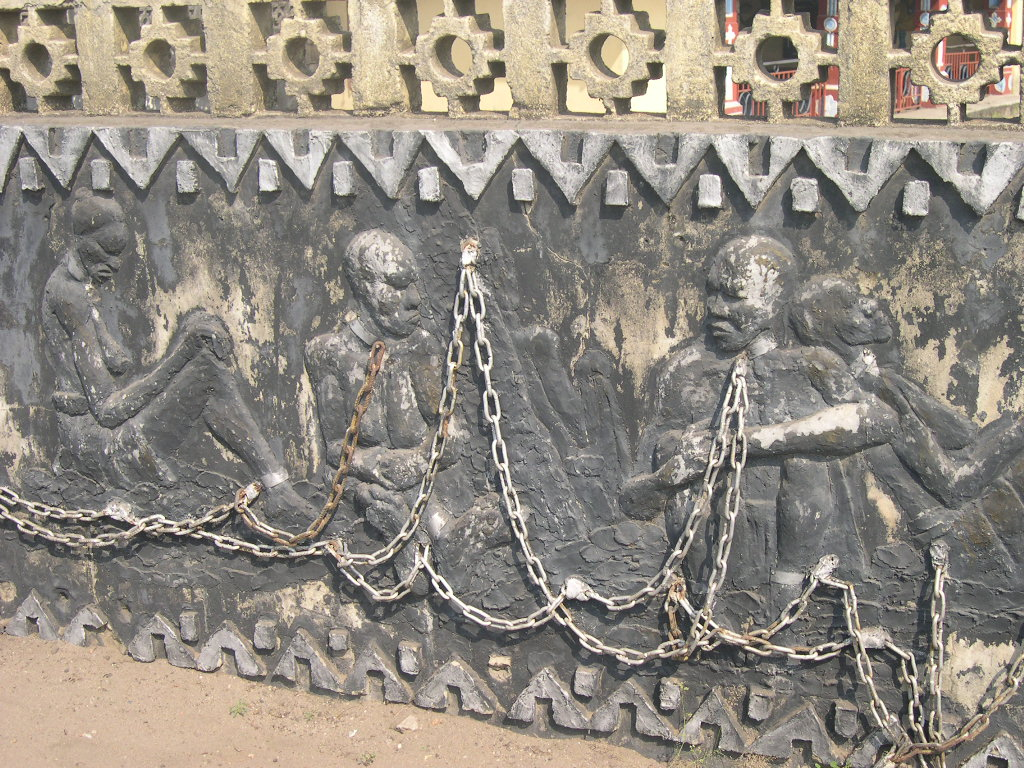
Slave relics

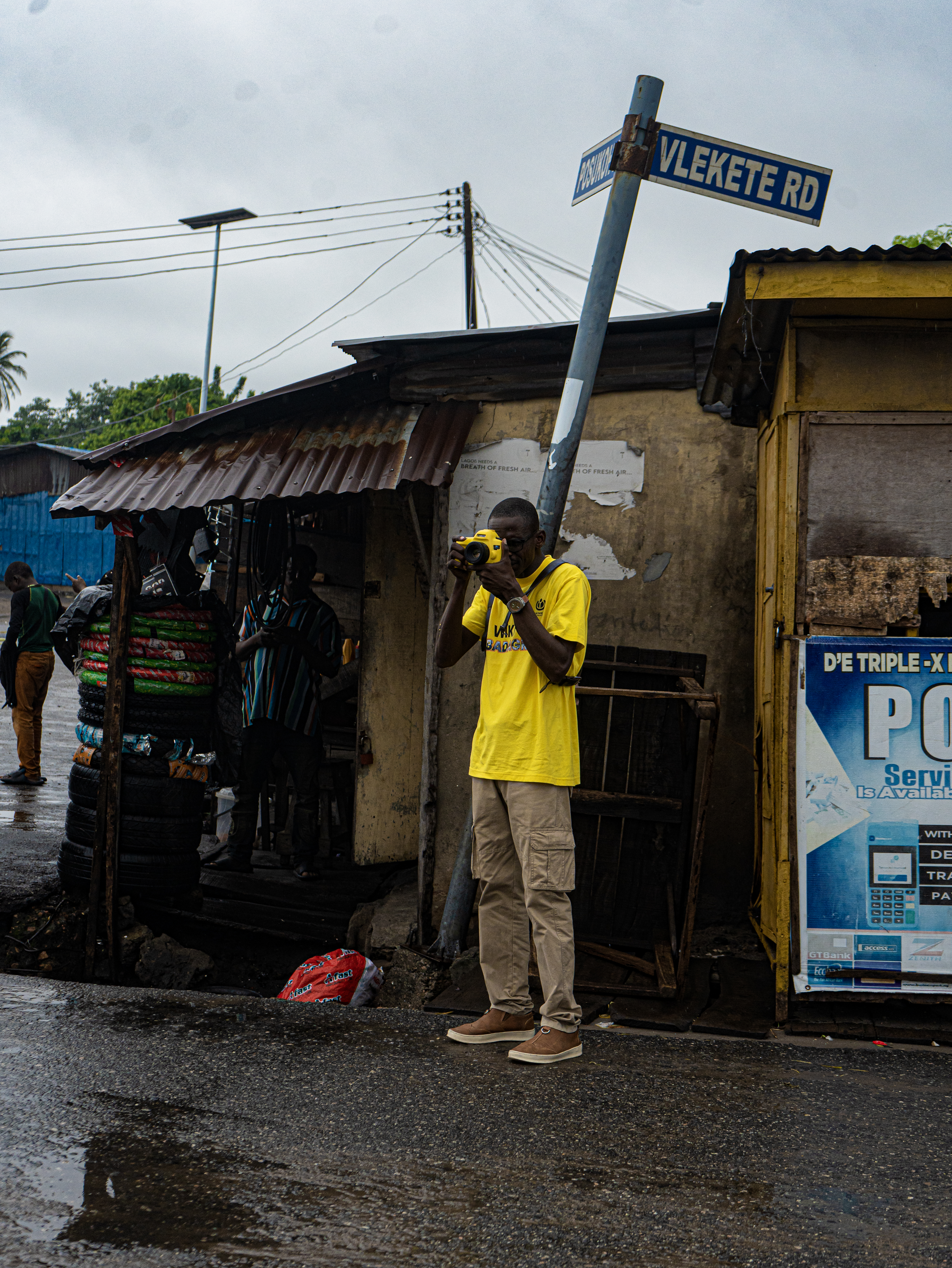
Vlekete road sign post
