= Mobee Royal Family Slave Relics Museum =

Nigerian museum

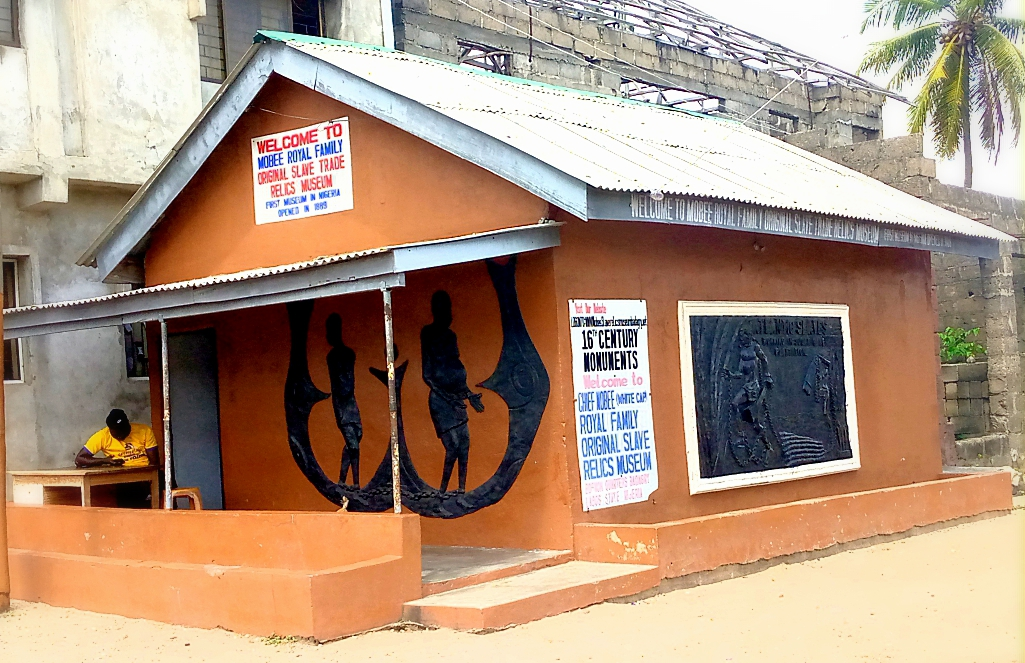
- Exterior of the museum
- Location: Badagry, Nigeria
- Type: Slave Museum
- Owner: Mobee Royal Family

The Mobee Royal Family Slave Relics Museum is a museum located in Badagry, Lagos State, Nigeria. Dedicated to relics of the slave trade, it is a privately owned museum operated by descendants of the traditional rulers of Badagry.

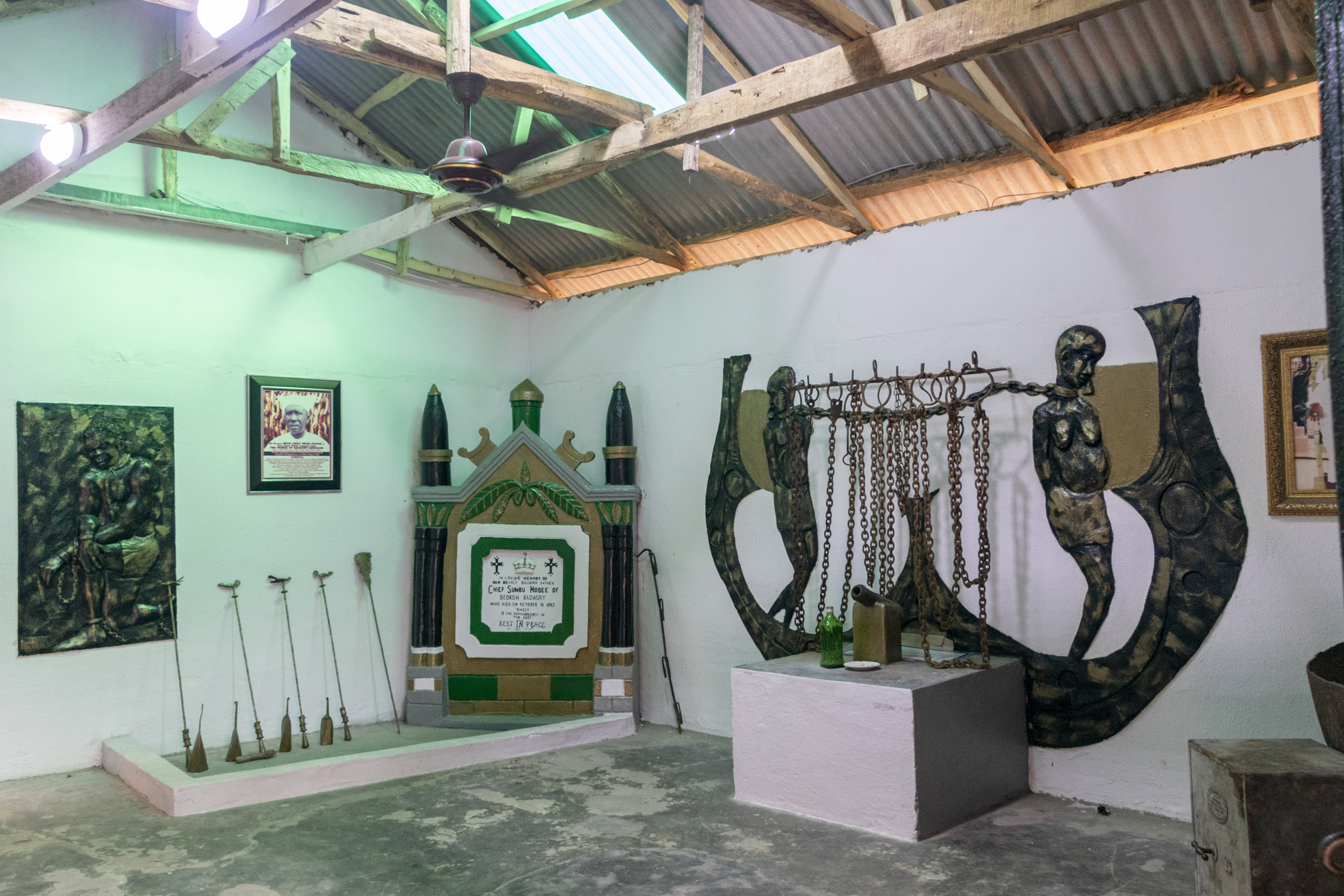
Inside the museum

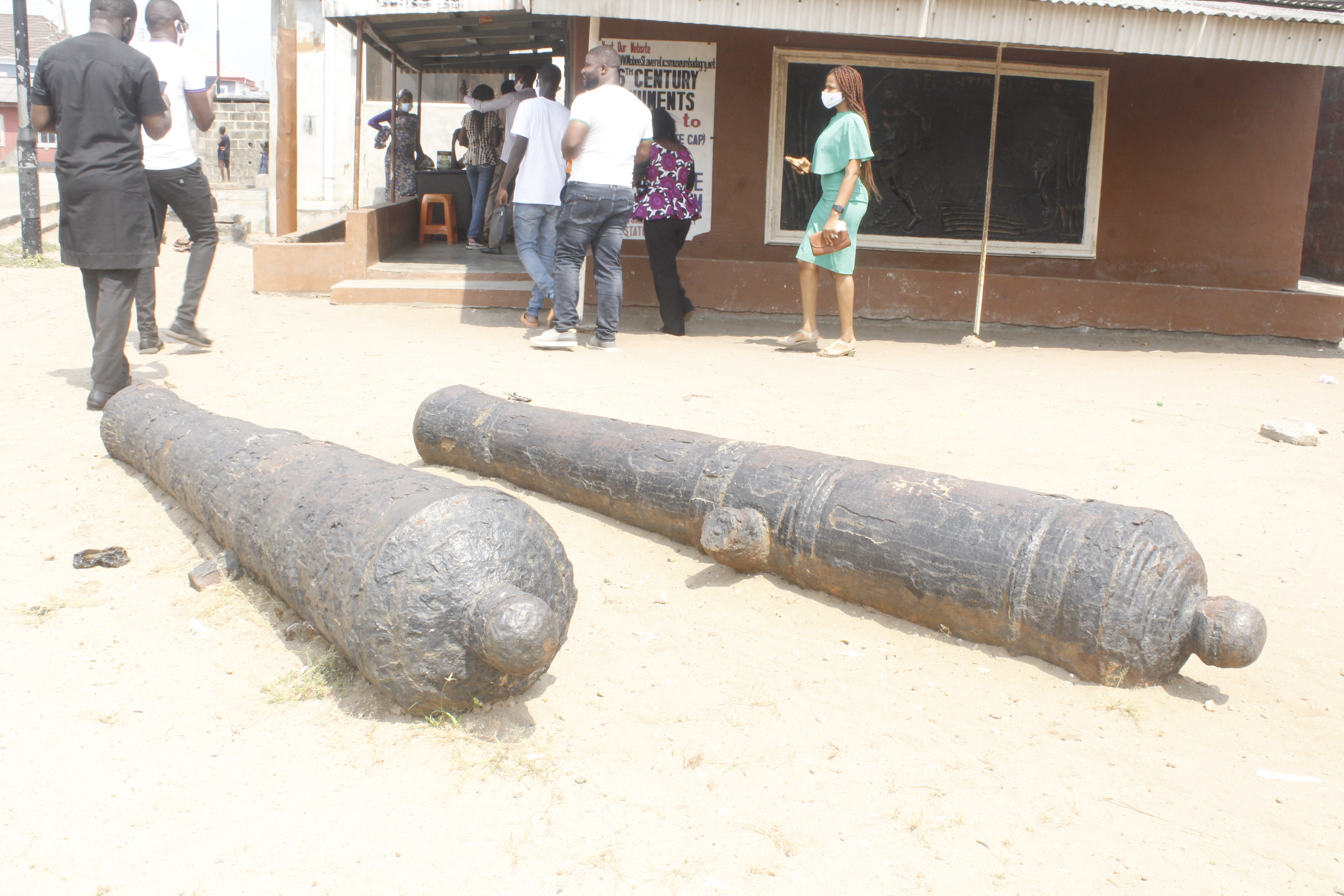
18th-century cannons outside the museum

The museum has manacles used by slave traders to shackle enslaved people, including those used to bind together the legs of two slaves to slow their movement. There is also a branding tool from the late 18th century which belonged to the slave merchant Sunbu Mobee, whose grave is located inside the museum. It was reportedly used to brand the name of the slave merchant onto the skin of enslaved people, and to pierce their lips to prevent them from eating while working in the fields. Other items include a ring-shaped tool which was used to punish enslaved people by being forced over a broken wrist and used to suspend them off the ground from a tree. Outside the museum are two 18th-century cannons, which could reportedly be exchanged for up to 100 slaves each.

== See also ==
- Seriki Williams Abass Slave Museum
- Velekete Slave Market
