= Gberefu Island =

Historical island located in Badagry, Lagos State

Nickname: Point of No Return
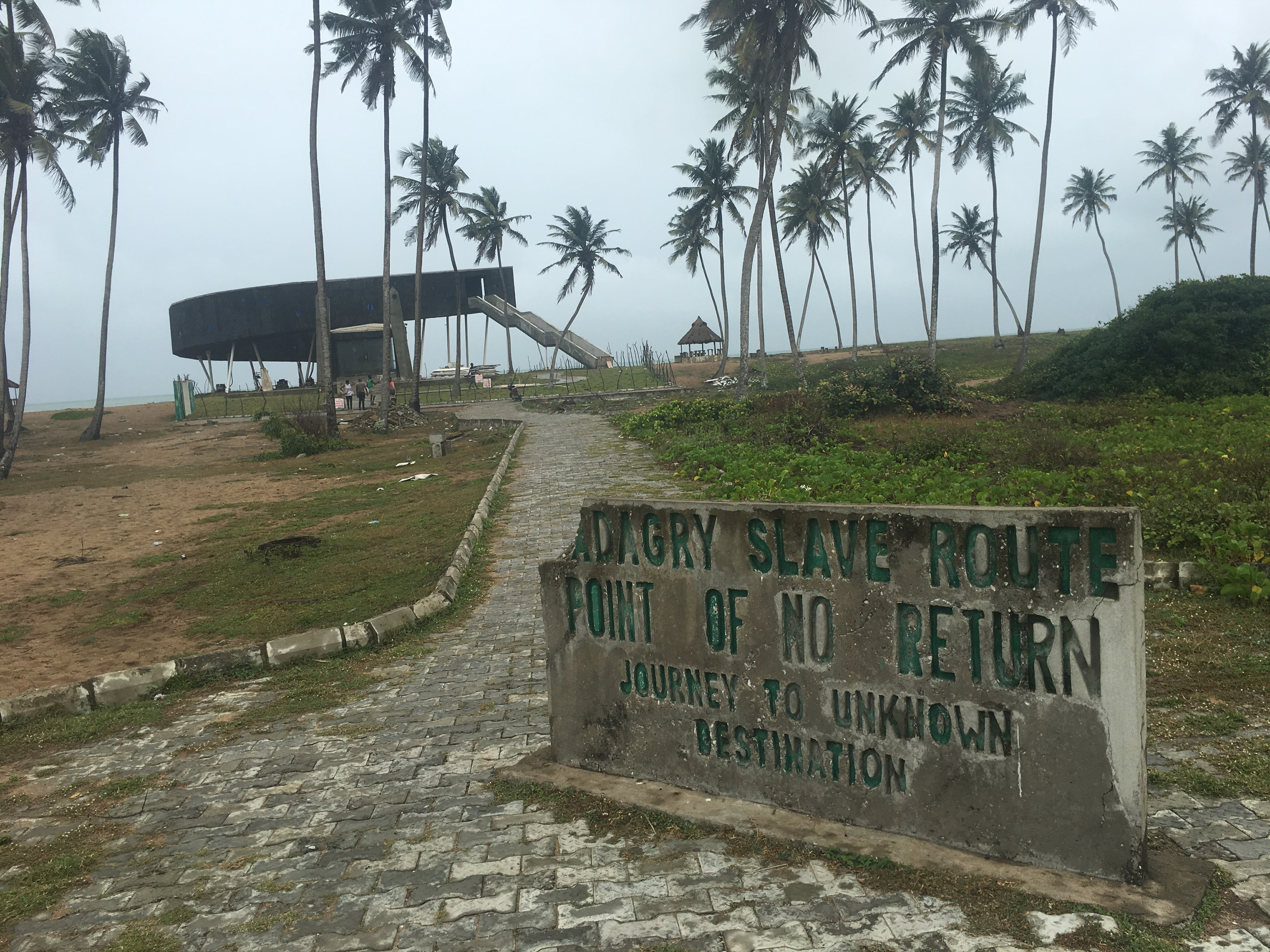
- Point of No Return, Gberefu Island

- Location within Nigeria

Geography
- Location: Close to Atlantic Ocean
- Coordinates: 6.417°N 2.883°E

Administration
- Nigeria
- State: Lagos State
- Local government area: Badagry

Demographics
- Ethnic groups: Ewes; Egun

Additional information
- Gberefu Island was opened as a slave port in 1473.

Gberefu Island also known as Point of No Return is a populated historical island located in Badagry, a town and local government area of Lagos State, South-Western Nigeria. Symbolized by two poles slightly slanted towards each other and facing the Atlantic Ocean, the island was a major slave port after it was opened in 1473 during the Trans-Atlantic Slave Trade era. According to Nigerian historians, as many as 3 million slaves were believed to have been shipped to the Caribbean and Americas between 1518 and 1880 from the island.

== People ==
Gberefu Island is headed by two chiefs, both crowned by the same Akran of Badagry Kingdom, and they are Chief Yovoyan (The Duheto of Badagry Yovoyan/Gbragada) II. and the late Chief Najeemu (The Numeto of Badagry Gberefu). The island's first settlers and real landlords are two Ewe communities (villages) under one umbrella, which are Gbragada, and Kofeganme (Yovoyan).

The Ewes of this island were salt merchants and fishermen from Keta (the KETAS) around 1734, but the majority of them are fishermen and farmers by occupation in the late 18th and early 19th centuries, although there are other ethnic groups living in the area, which comprises the Egun (Ogu) and Ilajes living in one harmony with their landlords.

== Etymology ==
Gberefu or Agbedefu-Gbe language, principally in Ewe means life is trouble/difficult.

== Tourism ==
Since Gberefu Island is an historic site, it has attracted several tourists around the world thereby increasing its notability. According to statistics released in 2015 by The Guardian, a total number of 3,634 people visited the island in 6 months.

== Gallery ==
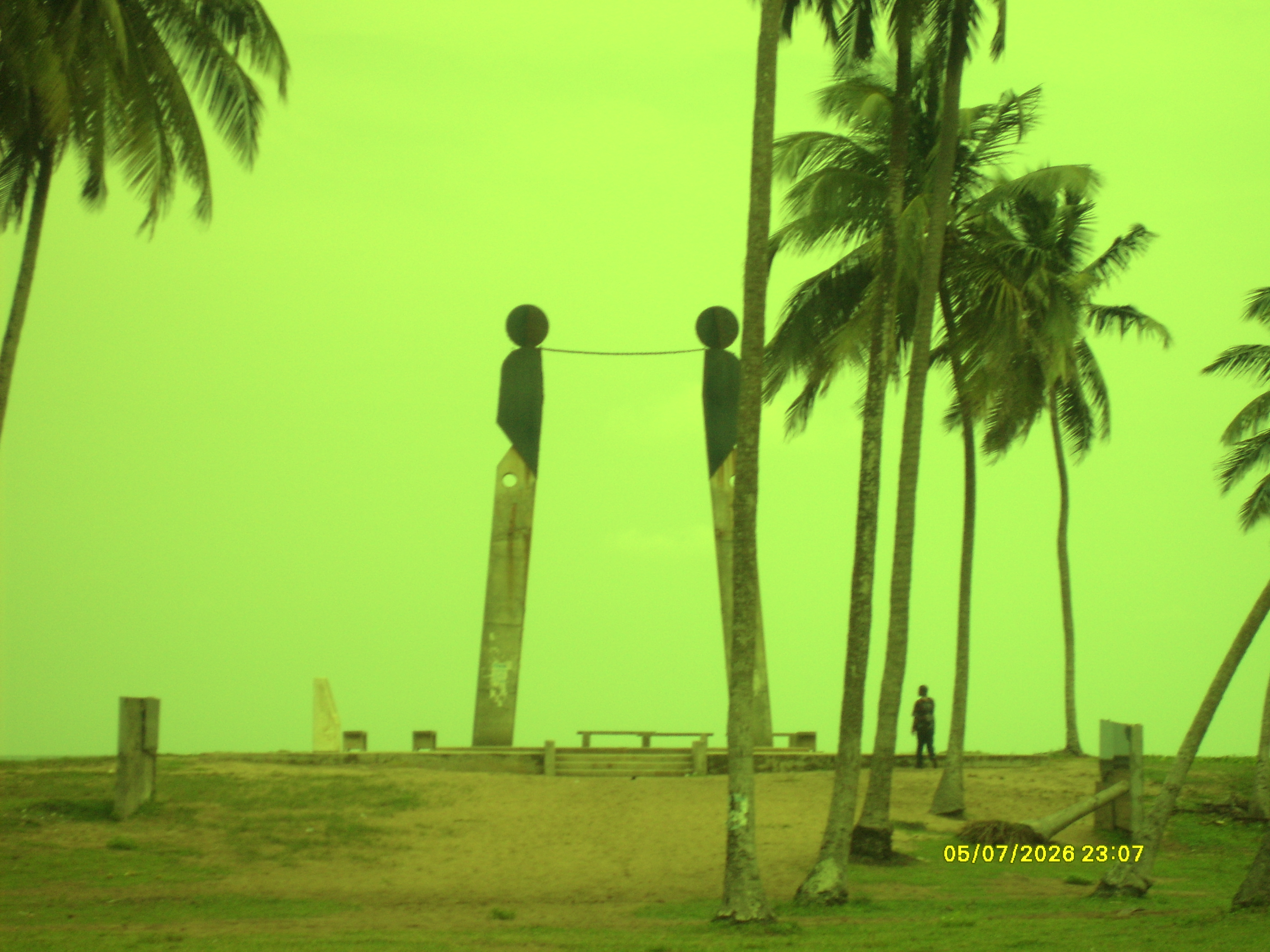
Point of No Return monument pictured in 2008

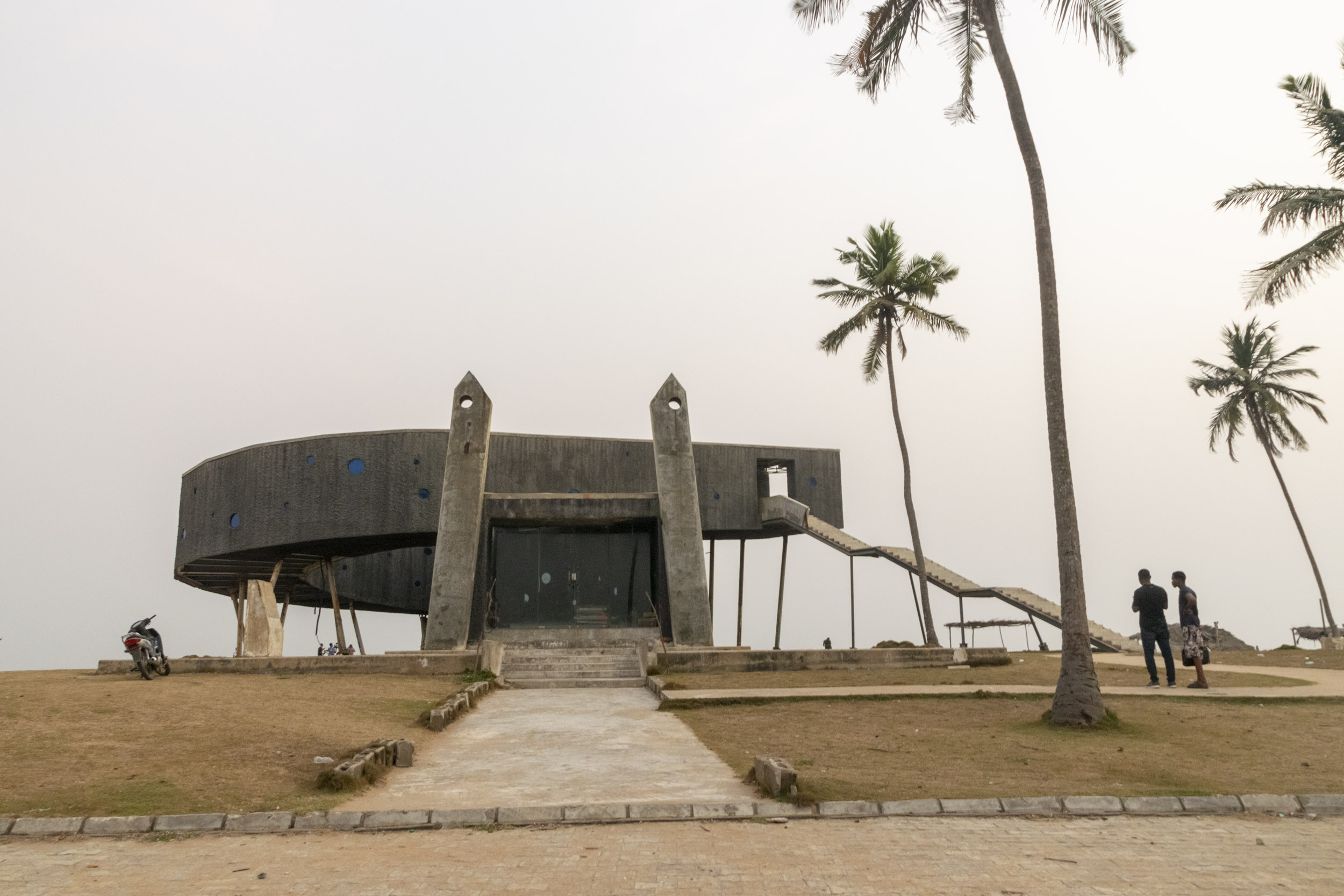
"Ark of Embarkation" built onto existing monument, pictured 2022

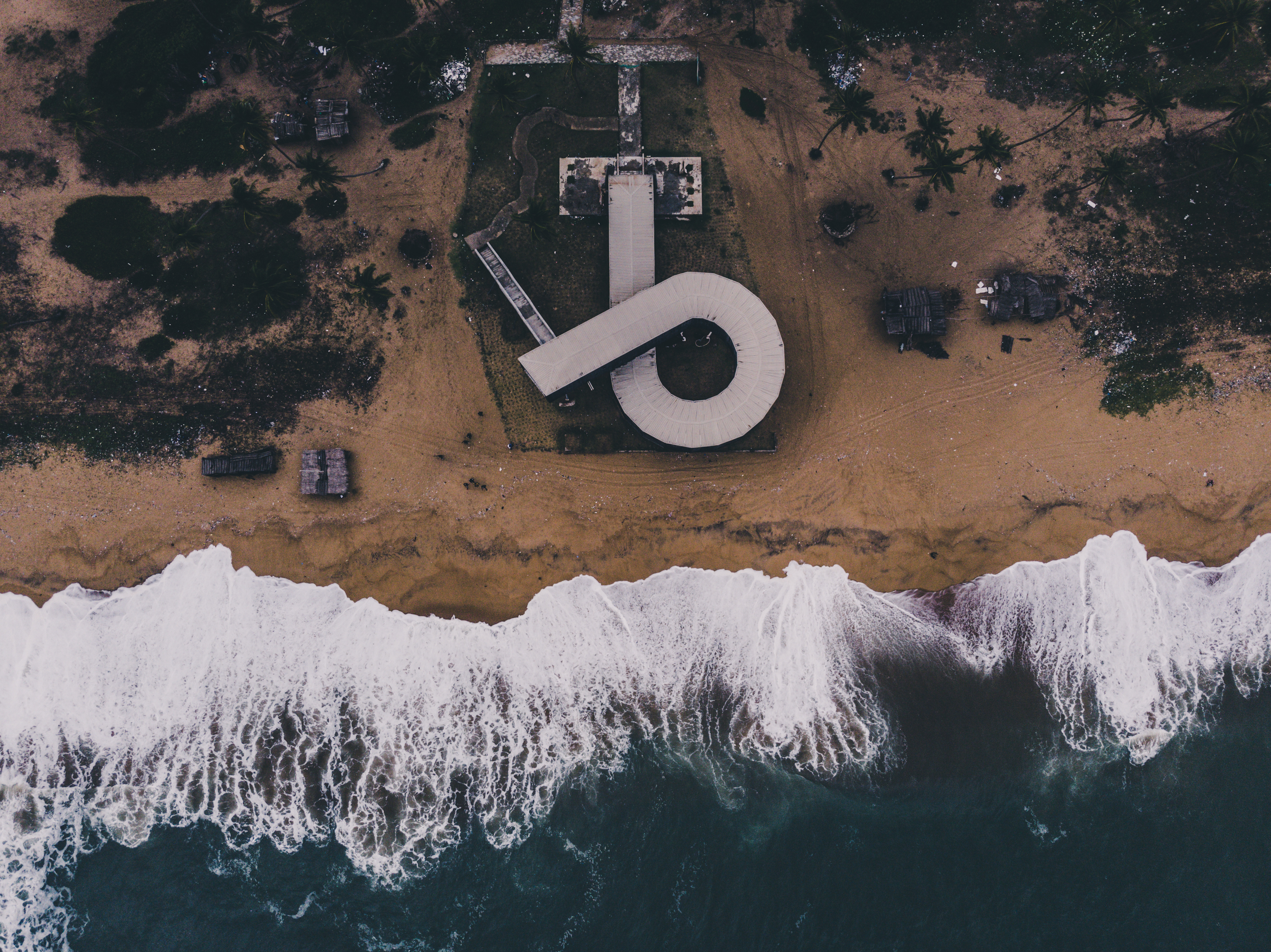
Structure from above

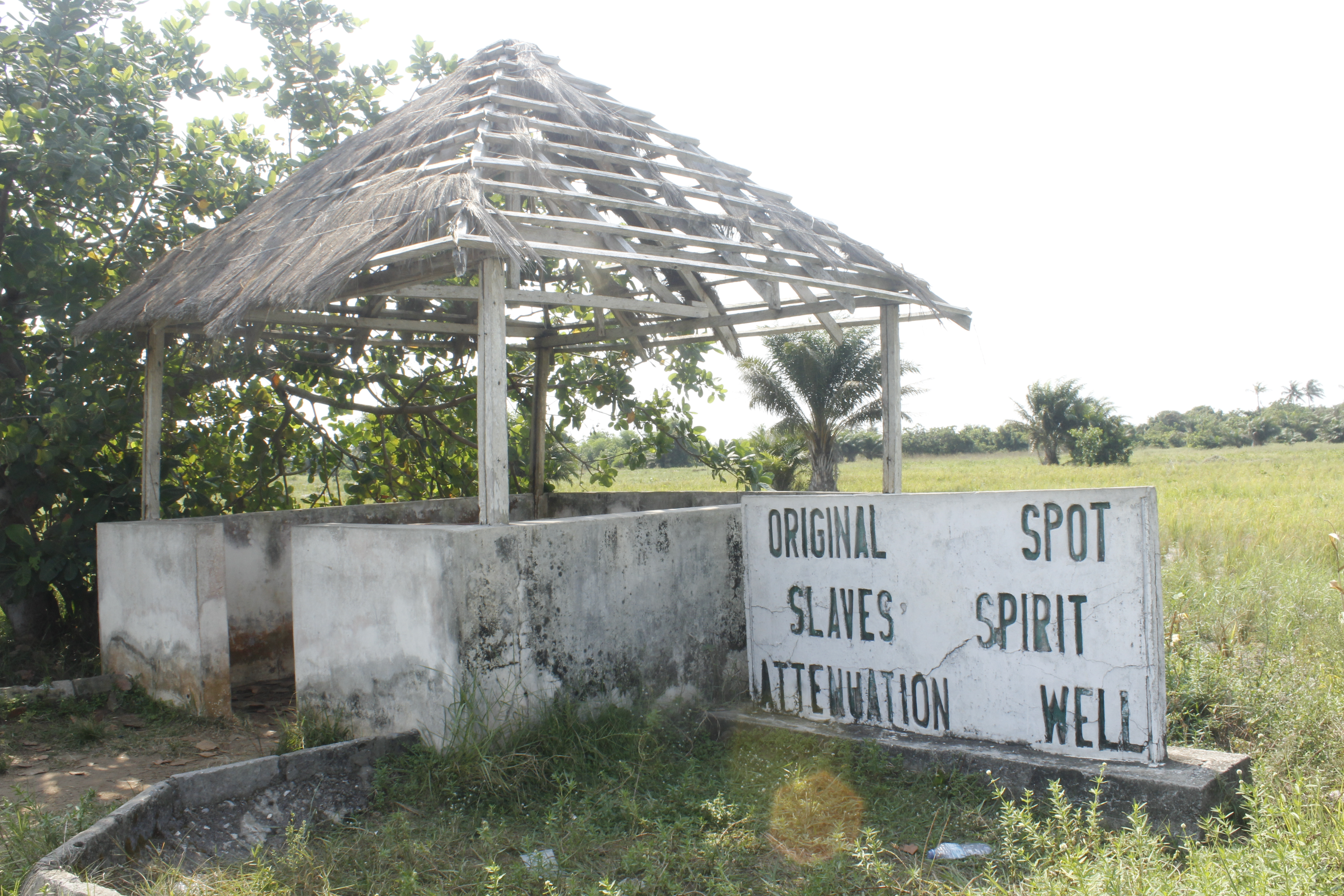
Spirit Attenuation Well

== Bibliography ==
- Africa Today. Afro Media. 2006.
- Hakeem Ibikunle Tijani (2010). The African diaspora: historical analysis, poetic verses, and pedagogy. Learning Solutions. ISBN 978-0-558-49759-0.
- Tigani E. Ibrahim; Babatope O. Ojo (1992). Badagry, past and present: Aholu-Menu-Toyi 1, Akran of Badagry, reign of peace. Ibro Communications Limited.
