= Holy Cross Cathedral, Lagos =

Holy Cross Cathedral
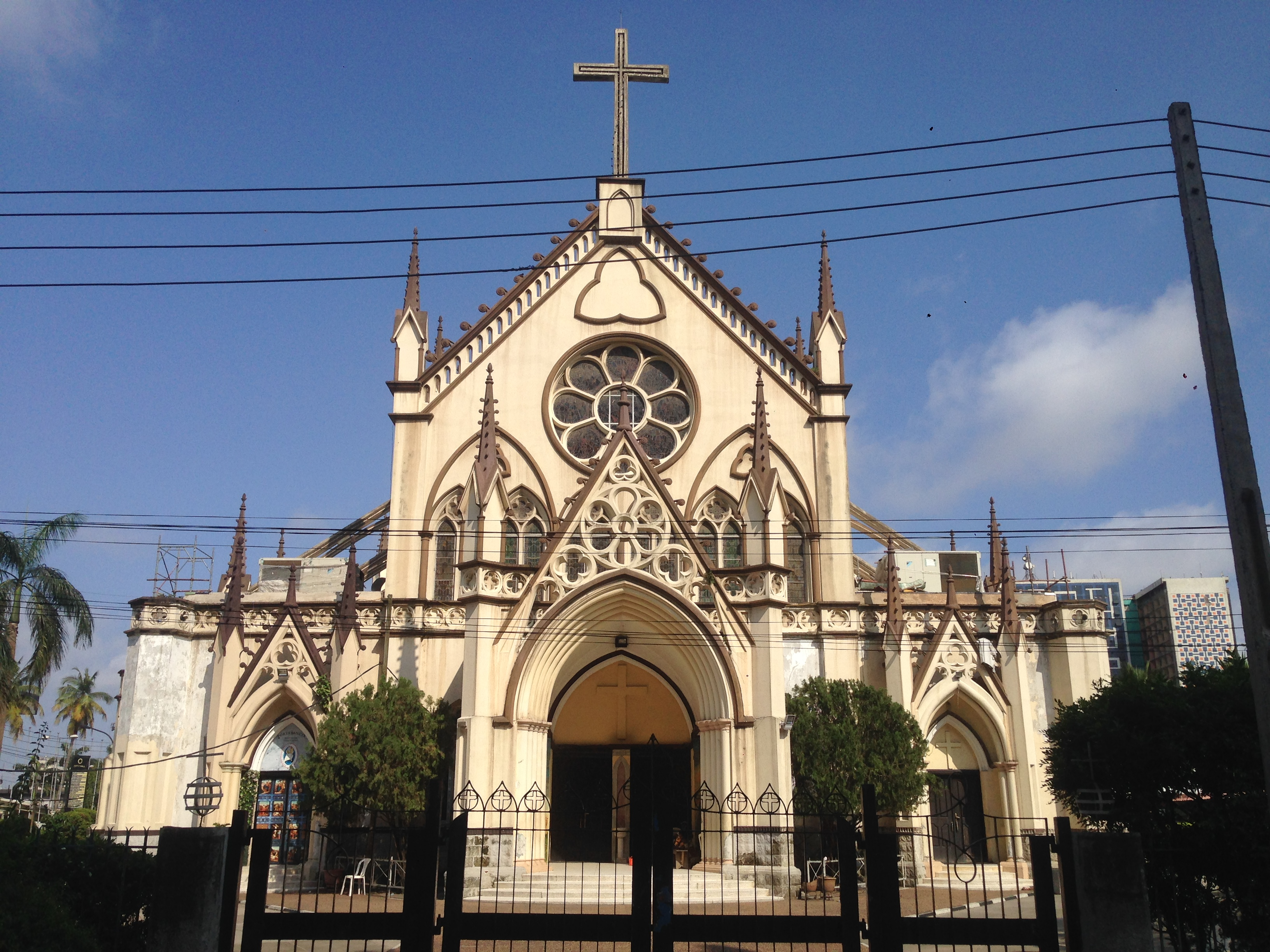
- Holy Cross Cathedral
- 6.4499°N 3.3966°E
- Location: Lagos
- Country: Nigeria
- Denomination: Catholic
- Website: www.hcclng.org

Architecture
- Heritage designation: Lagos State Grade 3 listed building
- Designated: Listed Sites Preservation Law 2011 Properties Law
- Architect(s): Lazarus Borges da Silva and Francisco Nobre
- Style: French Gothic
- Years built: 1934–1939
- Completed: 1939

Administration
- Archdiocese: Lagos

Clergy
- Archbishop: Alfred Adewale Martins

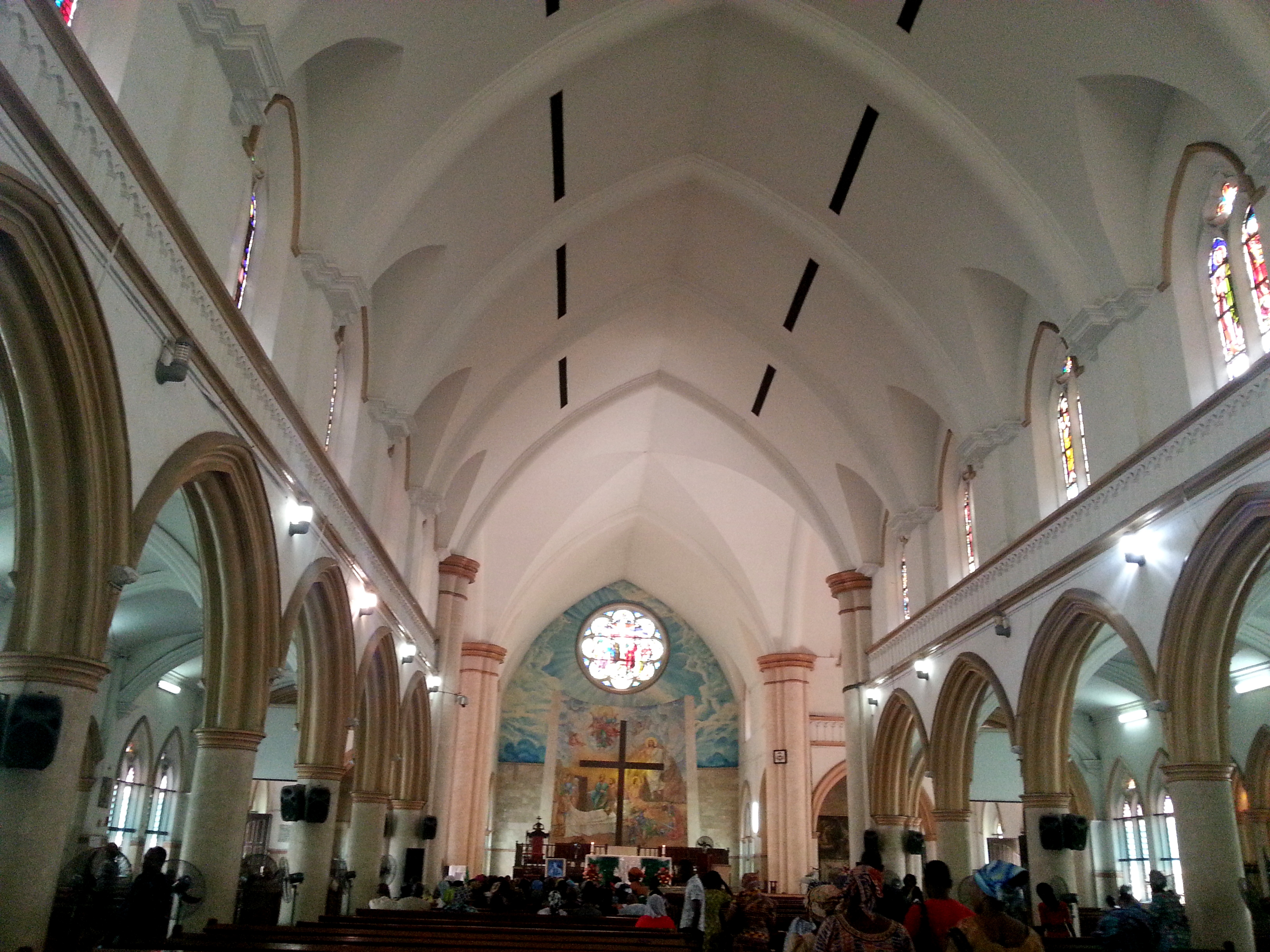

Holy Cross Cathedral is a Roman Catholic cathedral located in Lagos, Nigeria, and is the seat of the Archdiocese of Lagos. The Gothic style building was constructed in 1939, when the region was still administered as an apostolic vicariate, and thus was only elevated to the status of cathedral in 1950.

== History ==
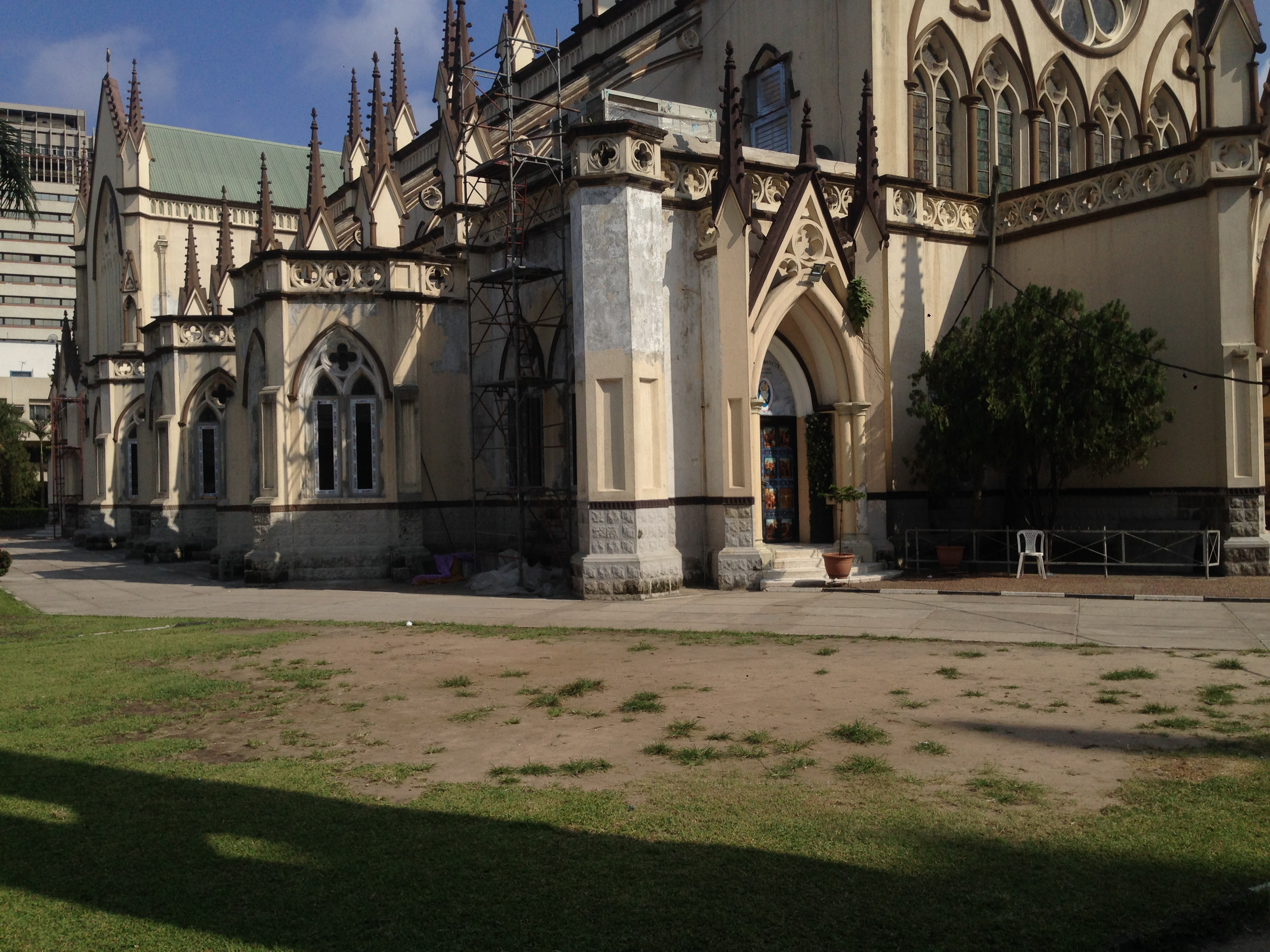

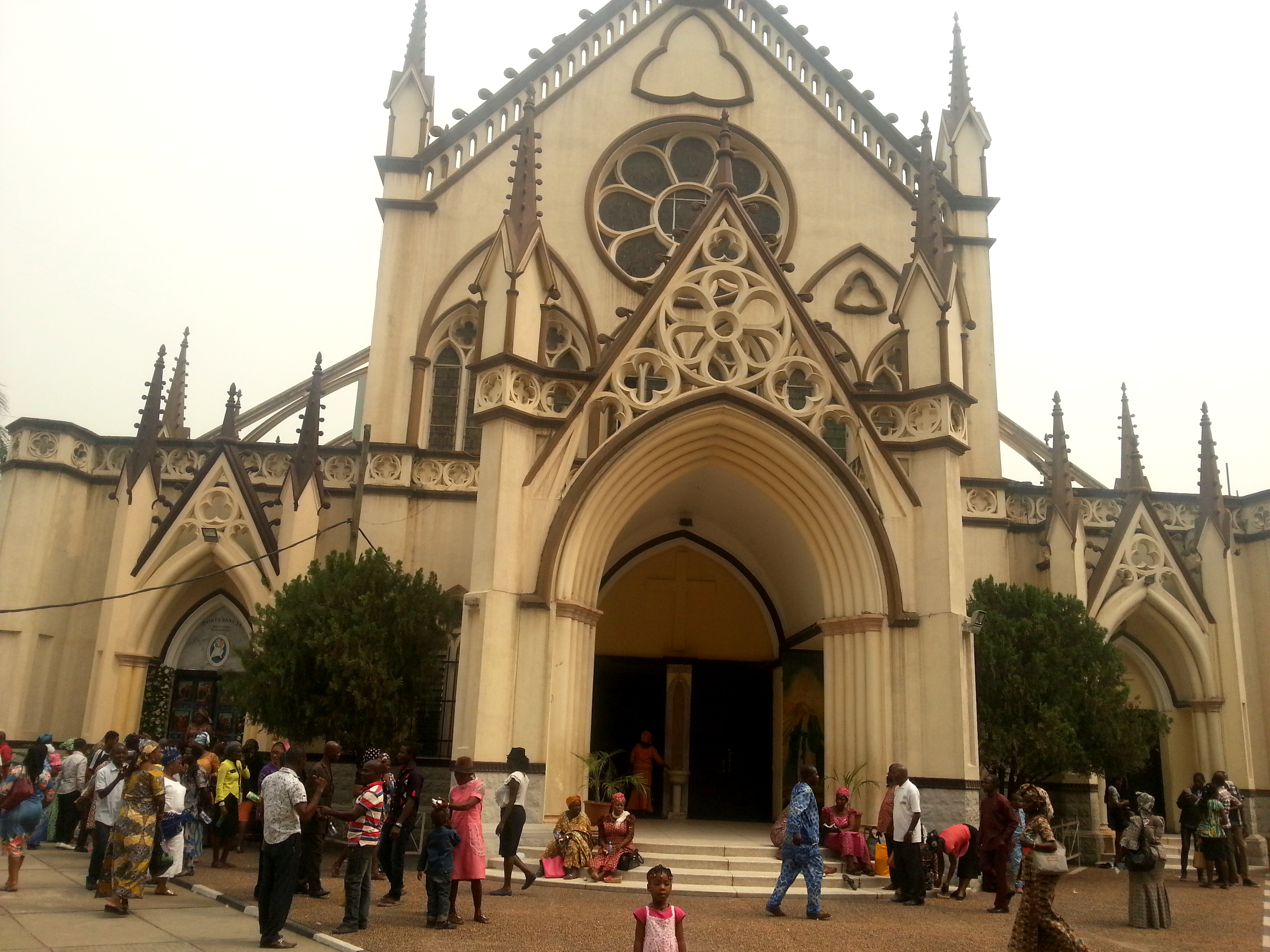

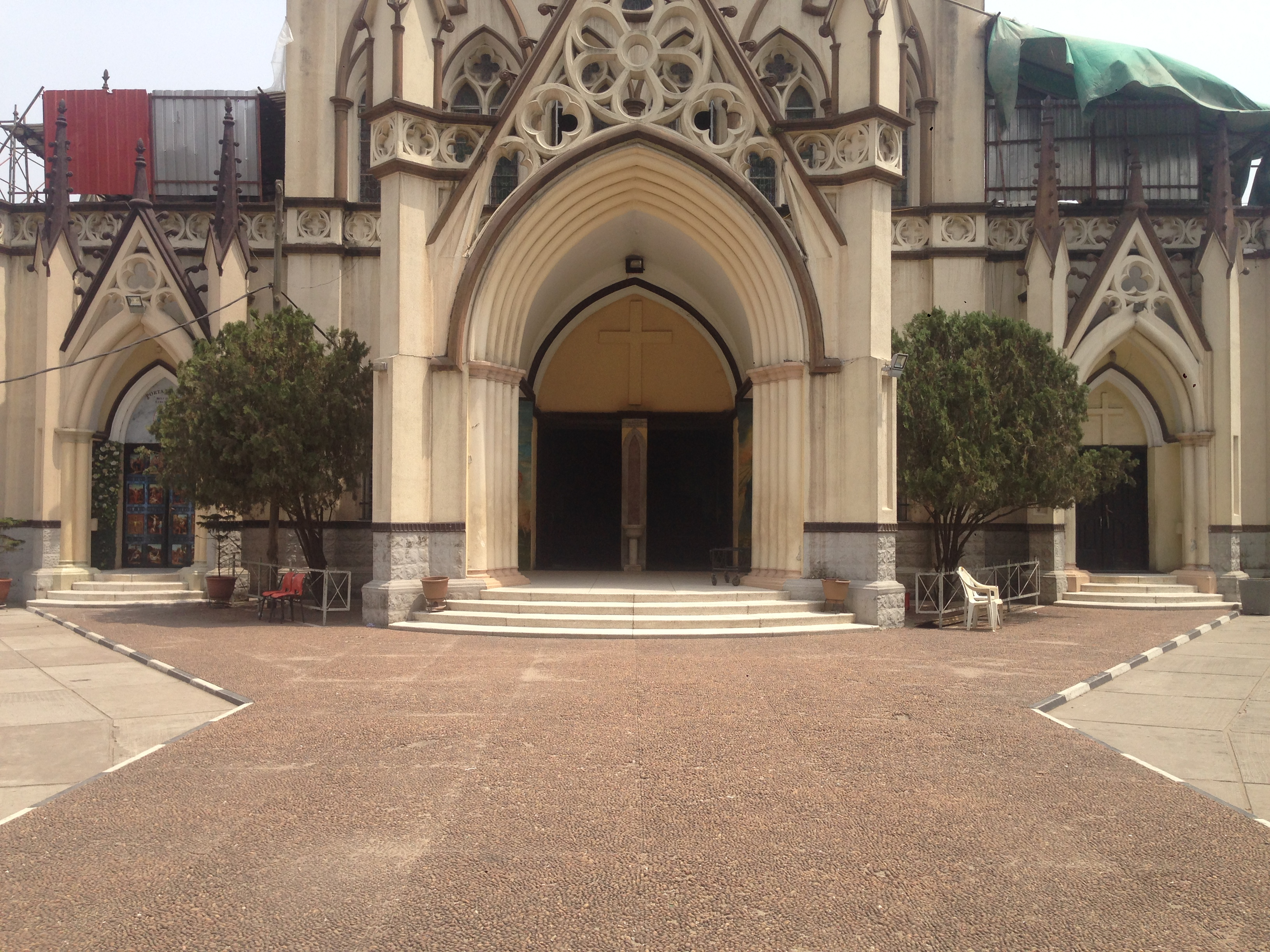

The first cathedral (considered a pro-cathedral) building was inaugurated in 1881 and built by stonemasons and architects Lazarus Borges da Silva and Francisco Nobre. After the death of Bishop Ferdinand Terrien in 1929, this original cathedral saw the ordination of the first three Yoruba priests, the late monsignors Lawrence Layode, Julius Onih, and Stephen Adewuyi, by Bishop Thomas Brodericks, the apostolic vicar of Western Nigeria. By the 1930s, a larger cathedral was needed, and the older one was demolished. The current church building, of French Gothic style architecture, had its foundation stone laid on 6 August 1934 by Bishop Francis O'Rourke and was completed in 1939.

Notable Members in the church's history include: 1. S. J. Sawyerr 2. Lourenzo Antonio Cardoso 3. Lazaro Borges da Silva 4. Francisco Nobre 5. J. F. D. Branco 6. Walter P. Siffre 7. Albert Carrena 8. David Evaristo Akerele 9. J. T. Munis 10. P. F. Gomes

On 18 April 1950, the apostolic vicariate of Lagos was elevated to metropolitan archdiocese in accordance with the papal bull entitled Laeto accepimus, issued by Pope Pius XII.

The latest Archbishop to be installed at the cathedral is Alfred Adewale Martins, who is incumbent since 2012.

By year-end 2016, the archdiocese counted 3,274,000 baptized out of a total population of 12,276,000 which corresponds to 26.7% of the total.

== Succession of pastors ==
- Francesco Borghero (1861 – 1865)
- Pierre Bouche (1867 – 1871)
- Jean-Baptiste Chausse, SMA (12 May 1891 – 30 January 1894, deceased)
- Paul Pellet, SMA (15 January 1895 – 1902, resigned)
- Joseph-Antoine Lang, SMA (19 July 1902 – 2 January 1912, deceased)
- Ferdinand Terrien, SMA (1 March 1912 – 3 August 1929, deceased)
- Francis O'Rourke, SMA (31 March 1930 – 28 October 1938, deceased)
- Leo Hale Taylor, SMA (13 June 1939 – 27 October 1965, deceased)
- John Kwao Amuzu Aggey (6 July 1965 – 13 March 1972, deceased)
- Anthony Olubunmi Okogie (13 April 1973 – 25 May 2012, retired)
- Alfred Adewale Martins, (25 May 2012 – present)

== Gallery ==
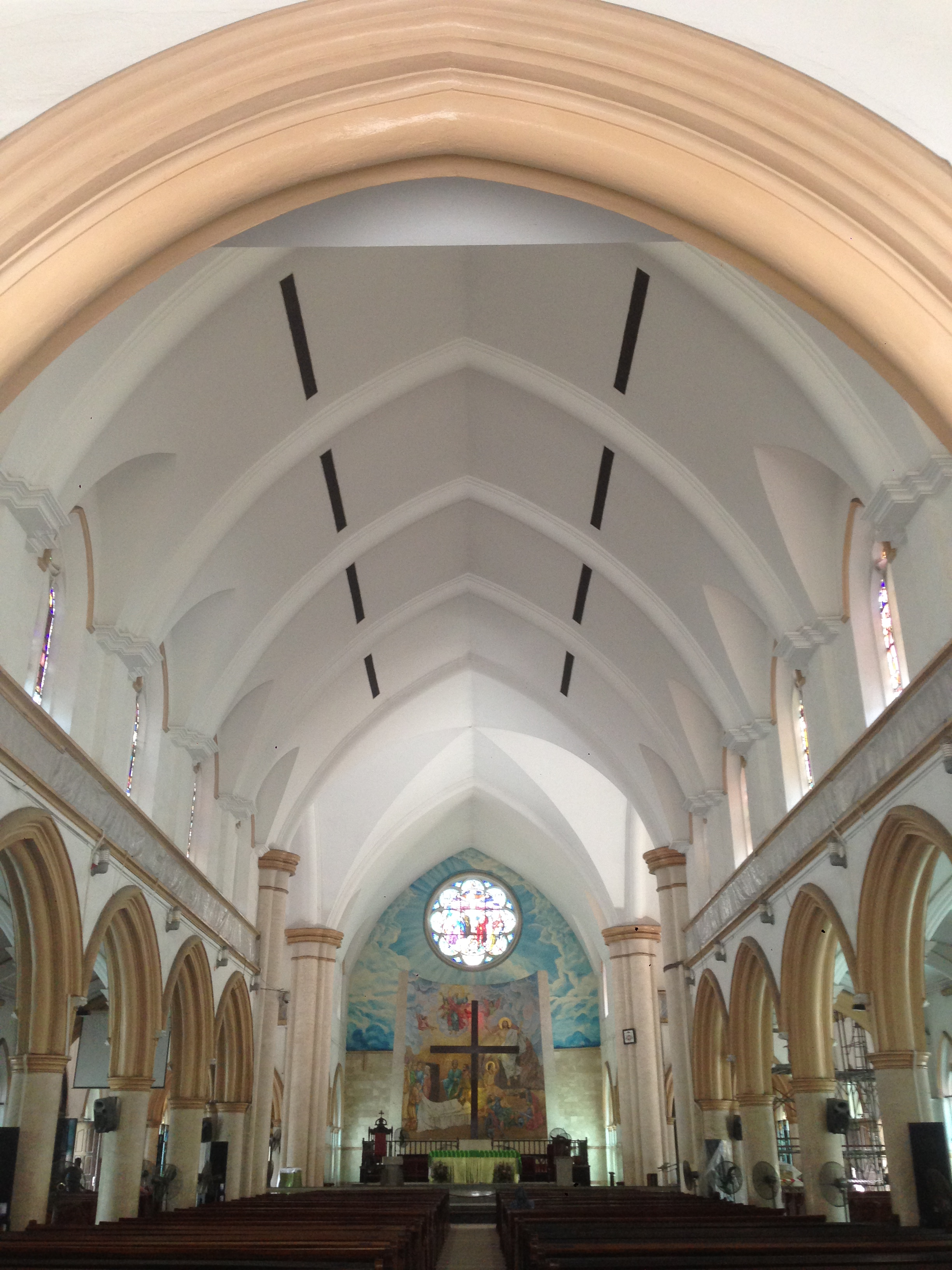
View of the cathedral ceiling

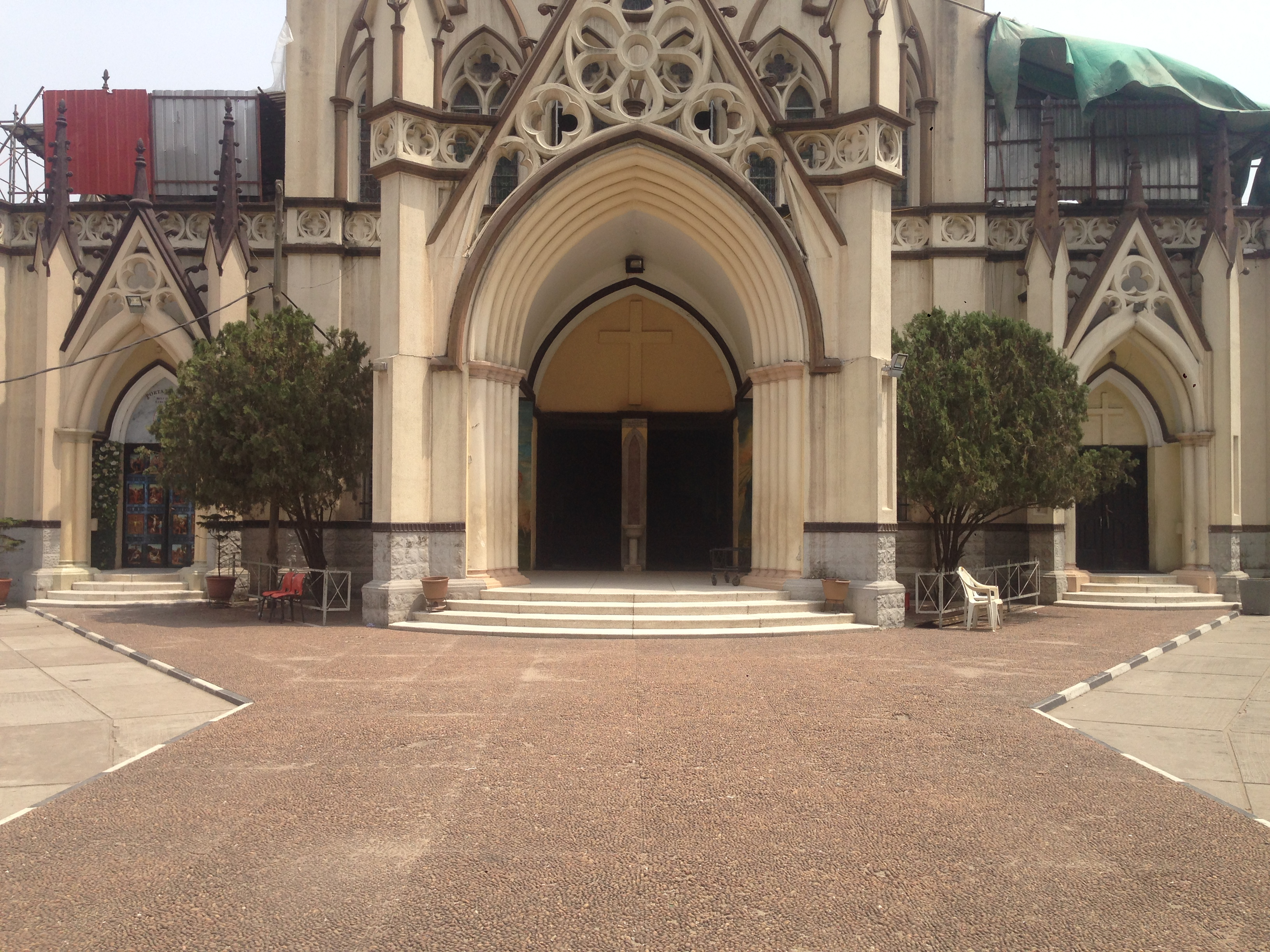
Façades of Holy Cross showing the three entrances

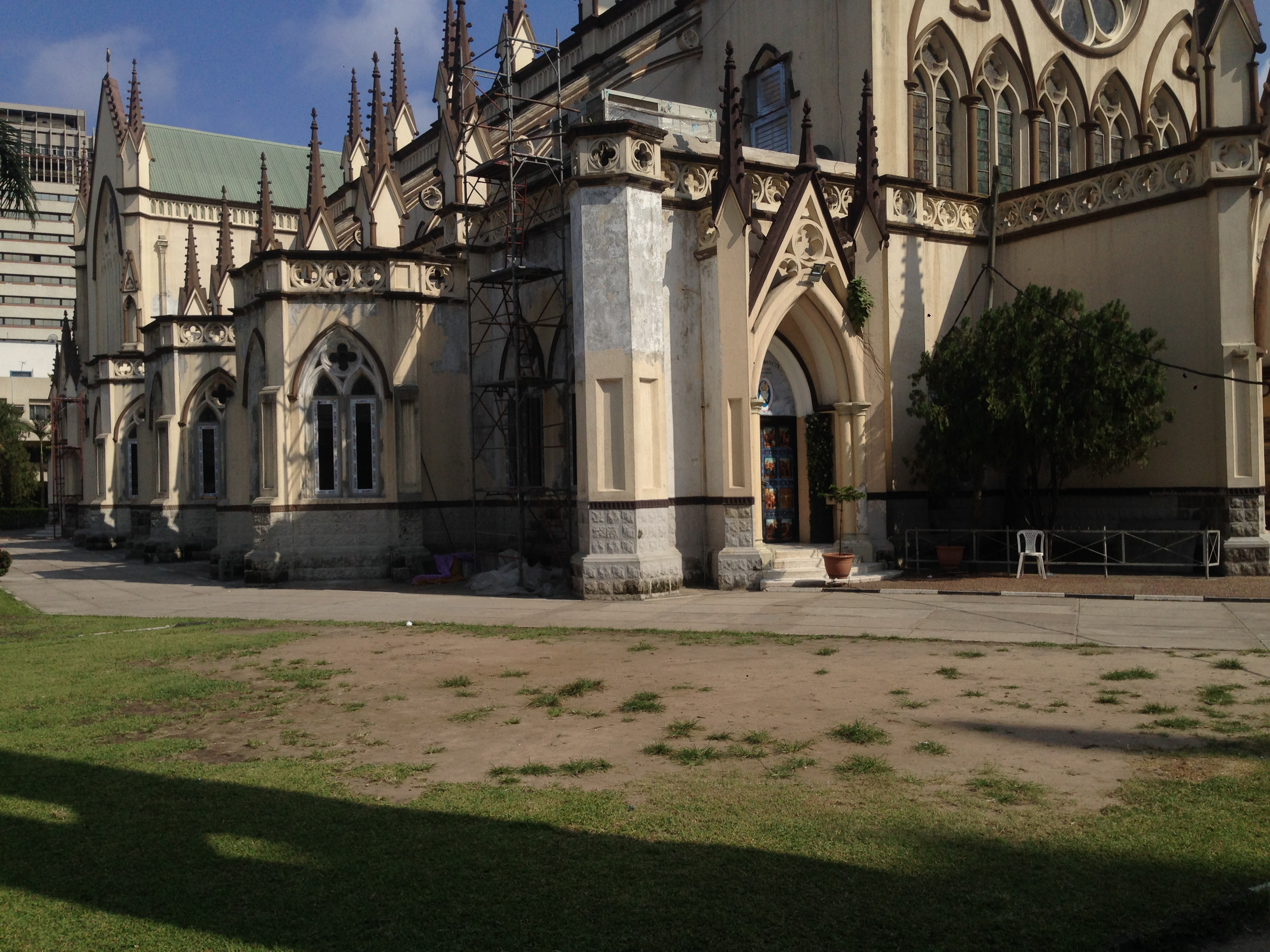
View of the cathedral exterior
