= Archdiocese of Lagos =

Roman Catholic archdiocese in Nigeria

Archdiocese of Lagos Archidioecesis Lagosensis
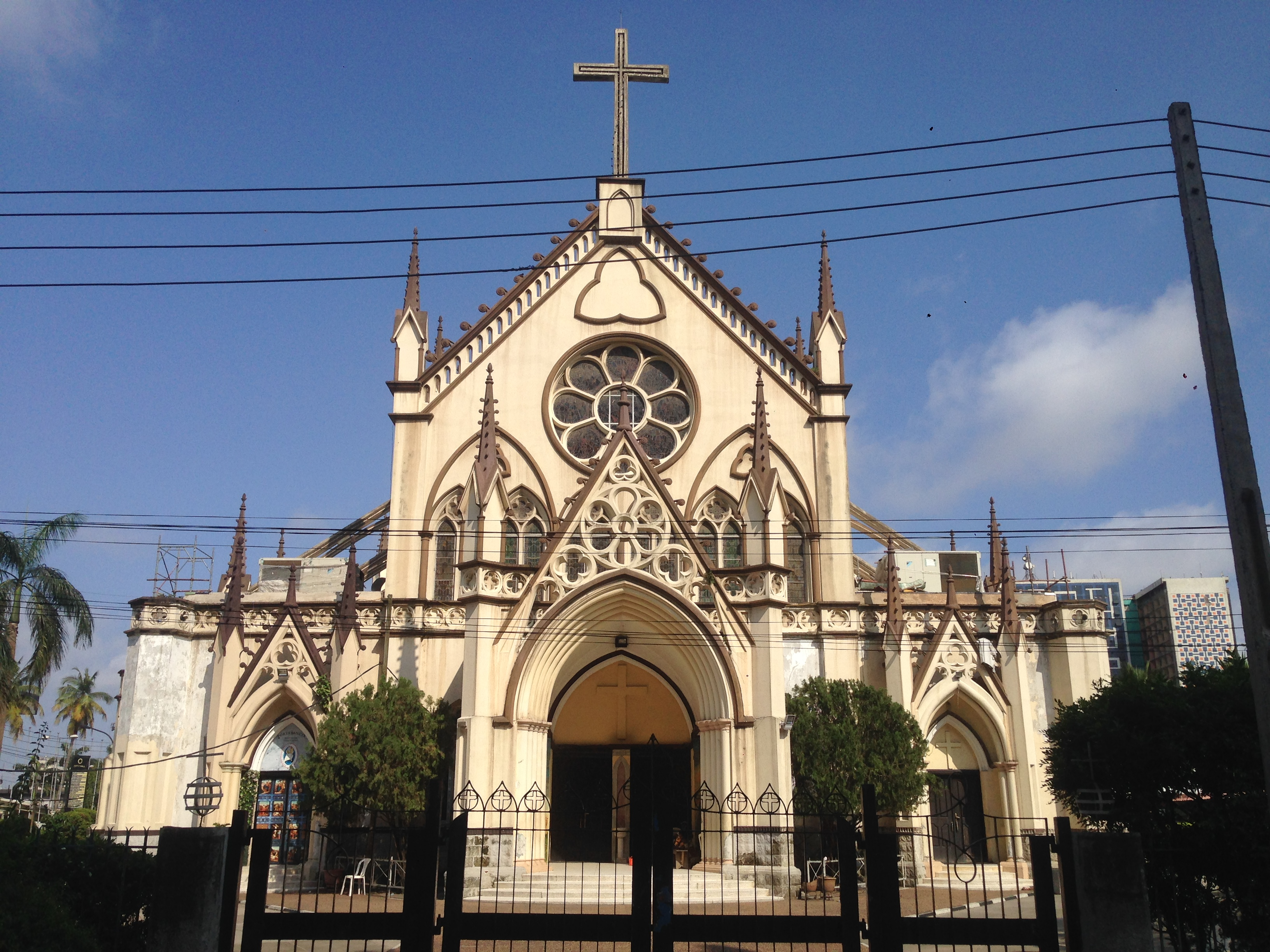
- Holy Cross Cathedral, Lagos

Location
- Country: Nigeria
- Territory: Lagos State
- Coordinates: 6°27′11″N 3°23′45″E

Statistics
- Area: 3,345 km^{2} (1,292 sq mi)
- Population: Total; Catholics: (as of 2022); 13,205,750; 3,365,461 (25.5%)
- Parishes: 204

Information
- Denomination: Roman Catholic
- Rite: Latin Rite
- Cathedral: Cathedral of the Holy Cross, Lagos
- Secular priests: 519

Current leadership
- Pope: Leo XIV
- Archbishop: Most Rev. Alfred Adewale Martins
- Suffragans: Abeokuta, Ijebu-Ode
- Bishops emeritus: Anthony Olubunmi Okogie

Map
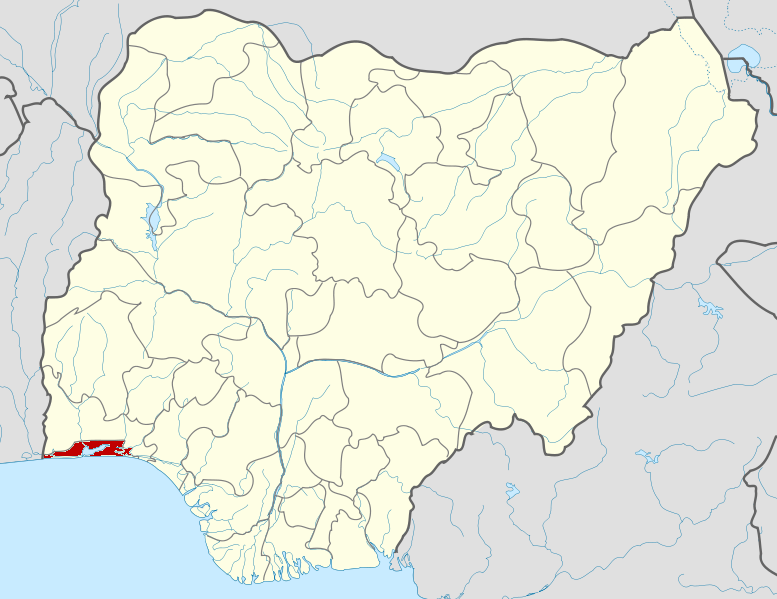
- Lagos State shown in red

Website
- www.archdioceseofLagos.org

The Roman Catholic Archdiocese of Lagos (Lagosen(sis)) is a Catholic Archdiocese in Lagos, Nigeria, which serves as the seat of the Metropolitan bishop of Lagos ecclesiastical province.

== History ==
=== Background ===
The origin of the Archdiocese of Lagos dates back to the effort of Irish and French missionaries of the Society of African Missions (SMA) to plant the seed of Catholicism in West Africa. The first venture by SMA to establish an African Mission in West Africa began in 1858 under the leadership of a Lyon based father, Melchior Joseph de Marion Bresillac. A member of the Paris Foreign Missions Society, Bresillac had spent time in India and his desire for the new society was to spread the church and train Africans as priests to continue the work of the mission. The proposal was originally opposed by Pope Pius IX but with Bresillac's determination, the propaganda prefect approved the mission. When the mission's objective was granted in 1856, Dahomey was chosen as location. In November 1858, when the first batch of missionaries sailed for West Africa, the location was changed to Sierra Leone as Dahomey was considered too dangerous. The missionaries consisted of two French fathers, Reymond and Bresson and one Brother. The missionaries arrived in January 1859. The news of their safe arrival reached Bresillac and in March, Bresillac and two other missionaries sailed for West Africa. Bresillac arrived Freetown in May 1859 but his expedition ended in gloom; Reymond and Bresillac died weeks after his arrival. Bresillac's assistant in Lyon, Augustin Planque took his position as Superior General, but unlike Bresillac, Planque stayed in Europe to provide support for the mission and in the eyes of the pope to ensure credibility of the mission. A third missionary expedition was approved, the superior of the mission was an Italian priest, Father Francesco Borghero. In 1860, Father Borghero traveled to Africa to start new a mission in Dahomey. The missions' first location was at Whydah, the second Church was in Porto-Novo and in 1868, the third location was Lagos.

=== Bight of Benin Vicariate ===
Lagos like Ouidah and Porto-Novo, Lagos had a sizable Brazilian and Catholic population. Prior to the establishment of the Lagos mission, mass service was already being performed by a Cathechist who went by Padre Anthonio. Starting in 1863, appeals by the Catholics resulted in two visits and one infant baptism by Fr. Borghero. By 1868, land had been secured for a Lagos mission, construction of a bamboo church and residence began at the present location of the Holy Cross Cathedral. Fr. Bouche and a brother were assigned to the new mission. However, West Africa was treacherous for the missionaries, one out of four died as a result of malaria or yellow fever

In 1870, the name of the Dahomey mission became Apostolic Vicariate of Bight of Benin. The land was severe for the missionaries and the conditions of operations was not helped by the Franco-Prussian War which affected SMA's supplies and communication to West Africa. But the missionaries in Nigeria placed zeal in their work, many learned Yoruba quickly, ate Yoruba food and established small primary schools. In 1873, the entry of sisters and Fr Chausse boosted the mission. The sisters operated St Mary's Convent which was the first in Nigeria. By 1880, the population of the Lagos mission was 2500 Catholics larger than that of Porto-Novo. Trekking tours by priests, led by Fr Chausse and Fr. Holley outside Lagos also showed a number of existing Catholics mostly returnee slaves from Brazil. During one of the tours, Abeokuta in Egbaland was chosen as the second location within Nigeria. The mission's entry into the city was supported by an Ogboni chief, Ogundipe and assisted by Marcollino Assumpcao. A land close to an existing Wesleyan church was provided to the Church to build a mission house. Another mission was also founded in Oyo. In 1883, Dahomey was carved out of the Bight of Benin Vicariate and Lagos became the headquarters of the Vicariate of Bight of Benin. In 1891, after letters by Lagosians to have their priest promoted, the Pro-Vicar of the Lagos mission, Jean Baptiste Chausse attained the title of Vicar Apostolic (similar to a Bishop). Due to a swamp close to Igbosere in Lagos Island, a Holy Rosary Confraternity was established as a second base for mass.

=== Building of schools ===
The propagation of the faith in Lagos and in the hinterland was effective through the provision of education to children as adults were not too impressed to drop their traditional values. In 1869, Fr. Bouche started a small school close to the bamboo church.

In 1875, the mission tried to establish a thriving community at Topo Island on the outskirts of Lagos. The community was to combine education and practical work. But lack of further cooperation from the Catholic community who were just Church attending Portuguese speaking people did not make the project a sustainable effort.

In 1884, St Gregory's School was opened in Lagos and in 1889 St John the Evangelist School began taking students. The Sisters of Our Lady of Apostles also developed St Mary's School in Lagos.

=== Archdiocese of Lagos ===
Between 1895 and 1901, Fr. Paul Pellet was bishop until he left for Lyon to become Vicar-General of SMA. Between 1912 and 1929, Ferdinand Terrien was bishop; during this period, three Africans from Oyo and Ibadan, Julius Oni, Lawrence Layode and Stephen Adewuyi were consecrated as priests in 1929. The Catholic Herald was founded during Terrien's tenure. Bishop Francis O'Rourke succeeded Terrien, he became the first Irish bishop of Lagos in 1930. In 1934, construction of the new Holy Cross Cathedral began, O'Rourke did not see the completed building but his was buried in the cathedral in 1938.

By 1950, Oyo and Ondo-Ilorin had been separated from the Bight of Benin Vicariate, and Lagos became headquarters of the Archdiocese of Lagos. Leo Taylor, a former principal at St Gregory's College, Lagos, was Archbishop of the Metropolitan See of Lagos. In 1954, the first Marian congress commemorating the apparition of Blessed Virgin Mary at Lourdes was held in Lagos. Cardinal McIntyre was the papal legate; it was the first time a cardinal set foot in the diocese.

- 1860.08.28: Established as Apostolic Vicariate of Dahomey from the Apostolic Vicariate of Two Guineas and Senegambia in Gabon
- 1870.08.24: Renamed as Apostolic Vicariate of Benin Coast
- 1943.01.12: Renamed as Apostolic Vicariate of Lagos
- 1950.04.18: Promoted as Metropolitan Archdiocese of Lagos

== Special churches ==
The seat of the archbishop is Cathedral of the Holy Cross in Lagos.

== Bishops ==
- Vicars Apostolic of Benin Coast (Roman rite)
  - Bishop Jean-Baptiste Chausse 1891.05.12 – 1894.01.30
  - Bishop Paul Pellet, S.M.A. 1895.01.15 – 1902
  - Bishop Joseph-Antoine Lang, S.M.A. 1902.07.19 – 1912.01.02
  - Bishop Ferdinand Terrien, S.M.A. 1912.03.01 – 1929.08.03
  - Bishop François O'Rourke, S.M.A. 1930.03.31 – 1938.10.28
- Vicar Apostolic of Lagos (Roman rite)
  - Bishop Leo Hale Taylor, S.M.A. 1939.06.13 – 1950.04.18 see below
- Metropolitan Archbishops of Lagos (Roman rite)
  - Archbishop Leo Hale Taylor, S.M.A. see above 1950.04.18 – 1965.10.27
  - Archbishop John Kwao Amuzu Aggey 1965.07.06 – 1972.03.13
  - Archbishop Anthony Olubunmi Okogie 1973.04.13 – 2012.05.25 (Cardinal in 2003)
  - Archbishop Alfred Adewale Martins since 2012.05.25

=== Auxiliary Bishops ===
- John Kwao Amuzu Aggey (1957-1965), appointed Archbishop here
- Anthony Olubunmi Okogie (1972-1973), appointed Archbishop here (Cardinal in 2003)

=== Other priests of this diocese who became bishops ===
- Anthony Olubunmi Okogie, appointed auxiliary bishop of Oyo in 1971; later returned here as auxiliary bishop; future Cardinal
- Anthony Saliu Sanusi, appointed Bishop of Ijebu-Ode in 1969

== Suffragan Dioceses ==
- Abeokuta
- Ijebu-Ode

== See also ==
- Roman Catholicism in Nigeria

== Sources ==
- GCatholic.org Information
