= Leo Hale Taylor =

Leo Hale Taylor CBE SMA
- Archbishop of Lagos
- Church: Catholic Church
- Archdiocese: Archdiocese of Lagos
- In office: June 30, 1939 – July 6, 1965
- Predecessor: Francis O’Rourke
- Successor: John Kwao Amuzu Aggey
- Other post: Titular Archbishop of Madytus (1965)
- Previous posts: Titular Bishop of Vartana (1934-1950); Vicar Apostolic of Western Nigeria (1934-1939)

Orders
- Ordination: June 21, 1914 by Daniel Cohalan
- Consecration: June 24, 1934 by Francis O’Rourke

Personal details
- Born: September 27, 1889 Montevideo, Minnesota, United States
- Died: October 27, 1965 (aged 76) Lagos, Federal Territory of Lagos, Federal Republic of Nigeria

Leo Hale Taylor CBE, SMA (born September 27, 1889 in Montevideo – died October 27, 1965 in Lagos) was an American-born priest of the Catholic Church and member of the Society of African Missions. He was Archbishop of Lagos from 1939 to 1965. Taylor was the first principal of St Gregory's College, Lagos and as bishop, he was considered a pillar of support for the school.

== Life ==
Taylor was born in Minnesota to parents of English and Irish background. Educated at St Joseph's College,

Wilton, Cork city, he was ordained a priest on June 23, 1914. Taylor was among the first group of trainee missionaries to attend SMA's seminary in Cork, Ireland. He was lifelong friends with Father Michael O'Flanagan, a nationalist sympathizer, a relationship that must have provoked nationalistic sentiments in Taylor. As founder of African Missionary, an SMA monthly newsletter, his writings were sympathetic to the nationalist cause.

His first missionary appointment was as a staff of the Vicariate of the Bight of Benin's Holy Cross Primary School in Lagos. He served at the school from 1920 to 1924, he then moved to Ibadan to serve as a teacher at St Theresa's Minor Seminary. When St Gregory's College Lagos became a full fledged college, Taylor was appointed its first principal. In February 1934, upon the death of the Irish Bishop of Western Nigeria, Taylor was nominated to succeed him. After the death of Bishop O'Rourke in Lagos, Taylor was brought back to Lagos as the new bishop.

=== Archbishop ===
At the beginning of his tenure, the Abeokuta, Oyo and Ibadan Diocese was within the Archdiocese of Lagos. Taylor had the zeal of the early missionaries in West Africa, he spoke Yoruba and was known to sometimes correct the Yoruba interpreter. He was also an avid cyclist and frequently traveled to out stations by road or forest path to practice the sacrament of confirmation or minister to a dying baptized Catholic.

To progress the mission of the church in Lagos and to close a gap in the need for elementary school teachers, Taylor established a teachers training school, Blessed Murumba's College at Ile-Ife in 1944. In 1943, he founded the Eucharistic Heart of Jesus Sisters at Ibonwon, an institution that practices chastity and vows to poverty.

In 1951, Taylor accepted a request from Dominican fathers to manage a new parish in Yaba. The fathers came from St Alberts Province in Chicago. The Parish is now called St Dominic's Parish, Yaba.

He died in 1965.
