= Diocese of Ijebu-Ode =

Roman Catholic diocese in Nigeria

Diocese of Ijebu-Ode Dioecesis Iiebuodensis
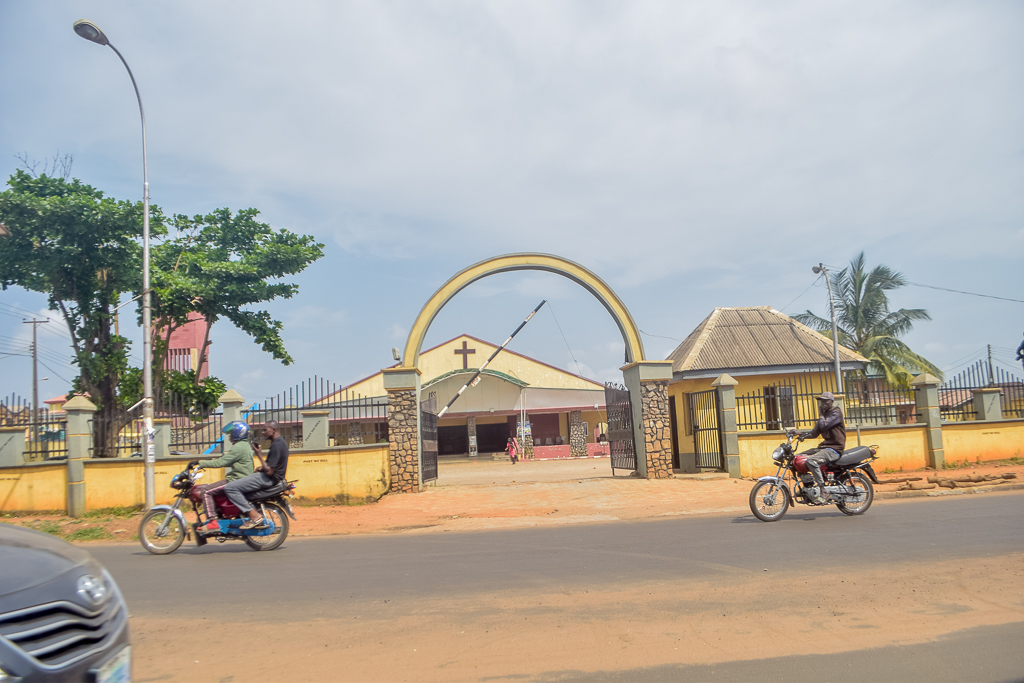
- Cathedral of Ijebu-Ode

Location
- Country: Nigeria
- Territory: Ogun State
- Ecclesiastical province: Lagos
- Metropolitan: Lagos
- Coordinates: 6°49′15″N 3°55′15″E

Statistics
- Area: 5,690 km^{2} (2,200 sq mi)
- Population: Total; Catholics: (as of 2022); 2,195,799; 84,774 (3.9%)
- Parishes: 41

Information
- Denomination: Roman Catholic
- Rite: Latin Rite
- Established: 29 May 1969
- Cathedral: Saint Sebastian Cathedral in Ijebu-Ode
- Secular priests: 52

Current leadership
- Pope: Leo XIV
- Bishop: Most Rev. Francis Obafemi Adesina
- Bishops emeritus: Albert Ayinde Fasina

Map
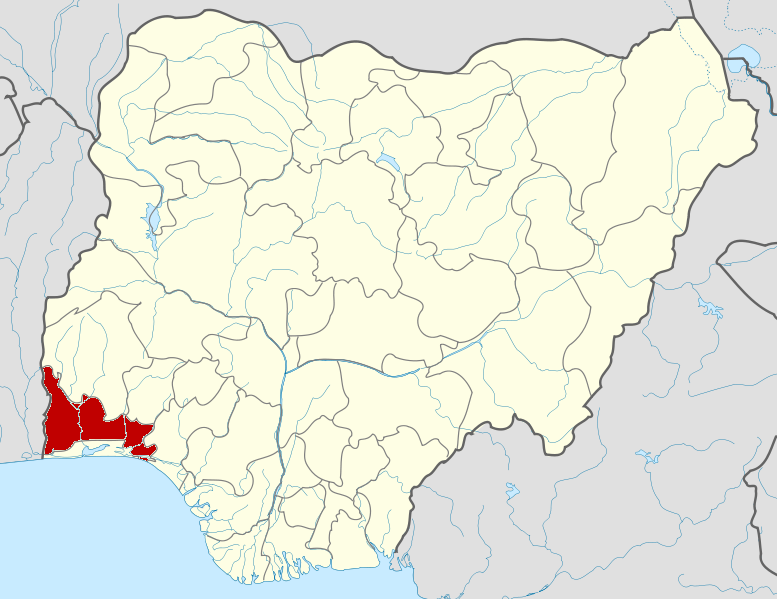
- Ijebu-Ode is located in Ogun State which is shown here in red.

The Roman Catholic Diocese of Ijebu-Ode (Latin: Iiebuoden(sis)) is a diocese located in the city of Ijebu-Ode in the ecclesiastical province of Lagos in Nigeria.

== History ==
- 29 May 1969: Established as Diocese of Ijebu-Ode from Metropolitan Archdiocese of Lagos
- 1883 Rev. Fathers Chause and Holley came to Epe, but the pagans prevented an establishment of the Faith.
- 1892 Conquest of Ijebu by the English, Freedom of Religion, Msgr. Joseph Lang with Revd. Fathers Pied, and Barlaglia travelled from Ibadan to Ijebu-Ode, stayed one night at Chief Olisa's house and said Mass, before leaving the next day. Revds. Elliot and Payne established in Ijebu-Imusin a Church of the Church Mission Society, in Esure.
- 29 July 1902 – Santa Congregation de Propaganda introduced the Catholic Church to lbonwon.

== Special churches ==
The Cathedral is St Sebastian's Cathedral in Ijebu-Ode.

== Bishops ==
- Bishops of Ijebu-Ode (Roman rite)
  - Bishop Anthony Saliu Sanusi (1969.05.29 – 1990.08.14)
  - Bishop Albert Ayinde Fasina (1990.08.14 - 2019.01.17); retired, Bishop Emeritus
  - Bishop Francis Obafemi Adesina (since 2019.01.17); formerly Rector of Saints Peter and Paul Seminary in Ibadan, Nigeria

=== Coadjutor Bishop ===
- Albert Ayinde Fasina (1988-1990)

== See also ==
- Roman Catholicism in Nigeria

== Sources ==
- GCatholic.org Information
- Catholic Hierarchy
