= Diocese of Abeokuta =

Roman Catholic diocese in Nigeria

Diocese of Abeokuta Dioecesis Abeokutanus
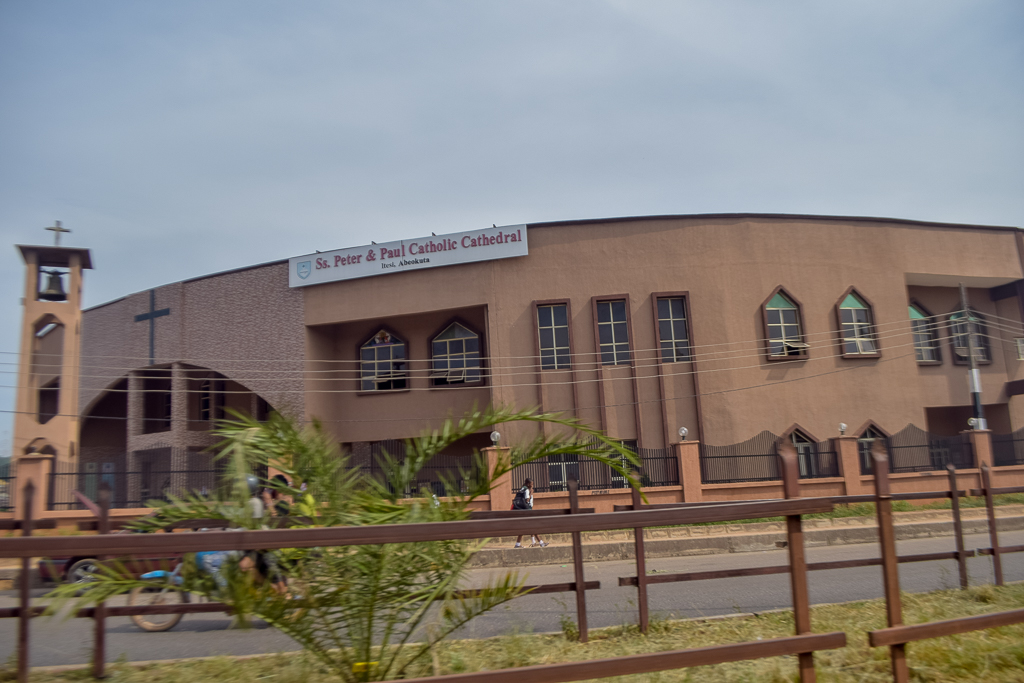
- Cathedral of Abeokuta

Location
- Country: Nigeria
- Territory: a portion of Ogun State
- Ecclesiastical province: Lagos
- Metropolitan: Lagos
- Coordinates: 7°9′39″N 3°20′54″E

Statistics
- Area: 9,636 km^{2} (3,720 sq mi)
- Population: Total; Catholics: (as of 2022); 5,348,140; 104,700 (2.0%)
- Parishes: 67

Information
- Denomination: Roman Catholic
- Rite: Latin Rite
- Established: October 24, 1997
- Cathedral: Cathedral of Saints Peter and Paul in Abeokuta
- Secular priests: 95

Current leadership
- Pope: Leo XIV
- Bishop: Bishop Peter Kayode Odetoyinbo
- Metropolitan Archbishop: Archbishop Alfred Adewale Martins
- Vicar General: Rev. Fr. Emmanuel Abiodun Oriyomi

Map
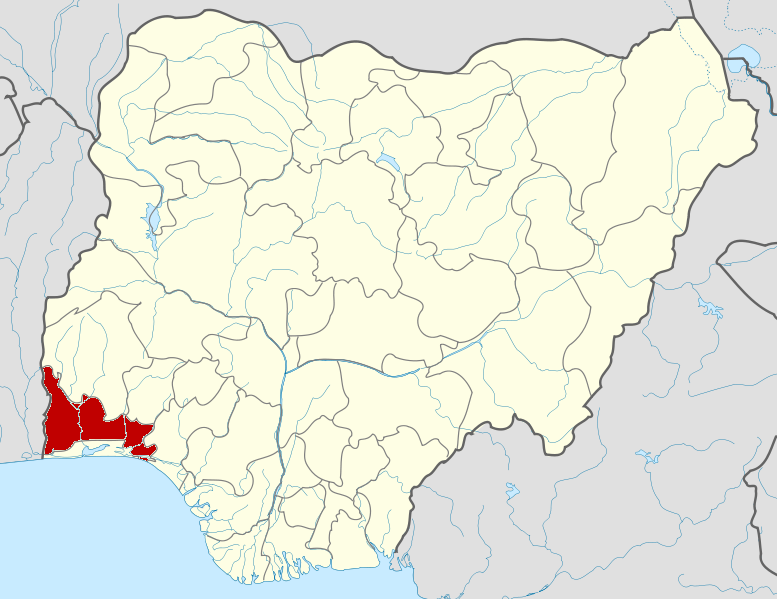
- Abeokuta is located in Ogun State shown here in red.

The Roman Catholic Diocese of Abeokuta (Latin: Abeokutan(us)) is a diocese located in the city of Abeokuta in the ecclesiastical province of Lagos in Nigeria.

== History ==
- October 24, 1997: Established as Diocese of Abeokuta from Metropolitan Archdiocese of Lagos. The area in question covers the Abeokuta Province of the British colonial era, which now comprises the Ẹ̀gbá, Yewa (Ẹ̀gbádò), Àwórì, Ègùn and Ànàgó divisions of Ogun State, the other division in the state being Ijebu which is co-terminus with the Diocese of Ijebu-Ode. Thus there are presently two dioceses in Ogun State: Ijebu-Ode and Abeokuta. The total landmass of the state (16,369.40 km^{2}.) is shared by the two dioceses thus: Abeokuta (10,679.38 km^{2}.) and Ijebu-Ode (5,690.02 km^{2}.)

Christianity was introduced into the diocese in the early part of the 19th century and the seat of the diocese, Abeokuta, currently houses the first Bible that was brought into the country by the early Missionaries. Catholicism came to Abeokuta in 1880 from where it spread to the other parts of what is now Abeokuta Diocese. The history of the Catholic Church in the Diocese of Abeokuta is intertwined with the wider history of the missionary works of the Fathers of the Society of African Missions (SMA) and Sisters of Our Lady of Apostles (OLA). While the SMA Fathers arrived in 1880, the OLA Sisters followed in 1886. Since then, the Church has continued to grow.

There are in the diocese approximately 68,000 adherents of the Catholic faith, presently distributed into 28 parishes and 7 quasi parishes, administered by a total number of 63 priests with His Lordship, Most. Rev. Dr. Peter Kayode Odetoyinbo. To the present The Diocese has witnessed a rapid growth from 9 parishes and 11 priests in 1998 to what we have now. Its pastoral strategy includes the formation and maintenance of Small Christian Communities and particular attention to the youth and young adults, the future of the Church.

The Diocese of Abeokuta, like Ogun State in which it is situated, is typically a 'Gateway' diocese. Not only does it connect the Archdiocese of Lagos with the closely situated Diocese of Ijebu Ode and the Archdiocese of Ibadan in Nigeria, it is also strategically interconnected with the Church in the wider area of the Economic Community of West African States (ECOWAS), especially the adjacent Diocese of Porto-Novo in the Republic of Benin.

There is visible peaceful co-existence among the religious groups in the diocese as we have close ecumenical relationship as well as cordial relationship with the other religious bodies. There are a lot of joint religious programmes between the various Christian denominations.

== Special churches ==
The Cathedral is Cathedral of Sts. Peter and Paul in Abeokuta.

== Leadership ==
- Bishops of Abeokuta (Roman rite)
  - Bishop Alfred Adewale Martins (24 Oct 1997 - 25 May 2012), appointed Archbishop of Lagos
  - Bishop Peter Odetoyinbo (June 25, 2014 till date)

== See also ==
- Roman Catholicism in Nigeria

== Sources ==
- GCatholic.org Information
- Catholic Hierarchy
