= Topo Island =

Island located in Badagry, Lagos

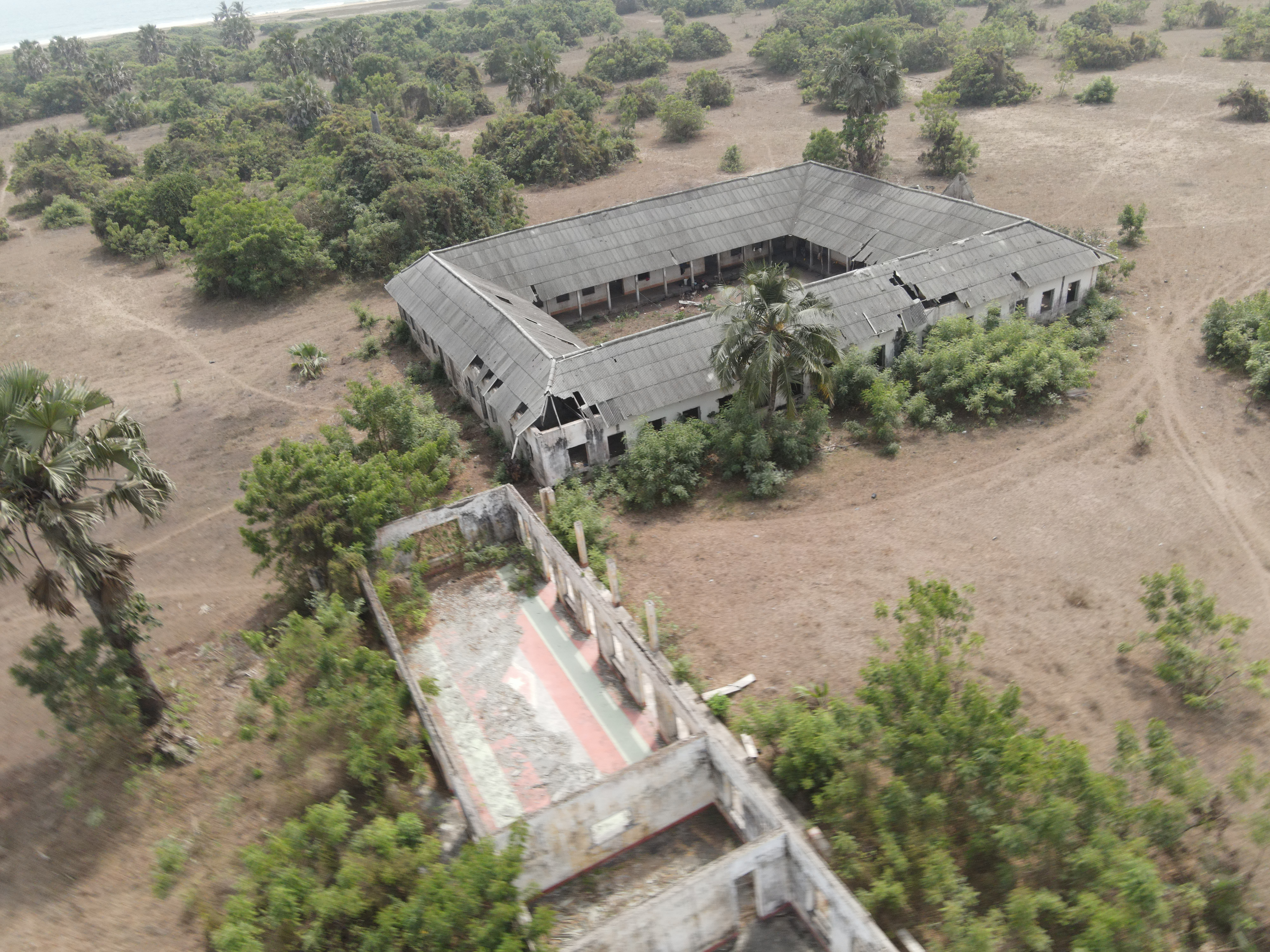
- Interactive map of Topo Island

Geography
- Location: Badagry
- Coordinates: 6°24′20″N 2°56′24″E

Administration
- Nigeria

Topo Island is an island located in the Topo town area of Badagry Local Government of Lagos State, in South-west Nigeria. The island was home to the missionaries who built a Chapel, Convent, Teacher training college, cemetery and also a coconut plantation. The island was later abandoned in 1962 when the missionaries left and the locals also left once the plantation could no longer support them.

The island is known for coconut plantation, tourism attractions, and Catholics pilgrimage to a site where an early missionary cemetery is located.

== Photo Gallery ==
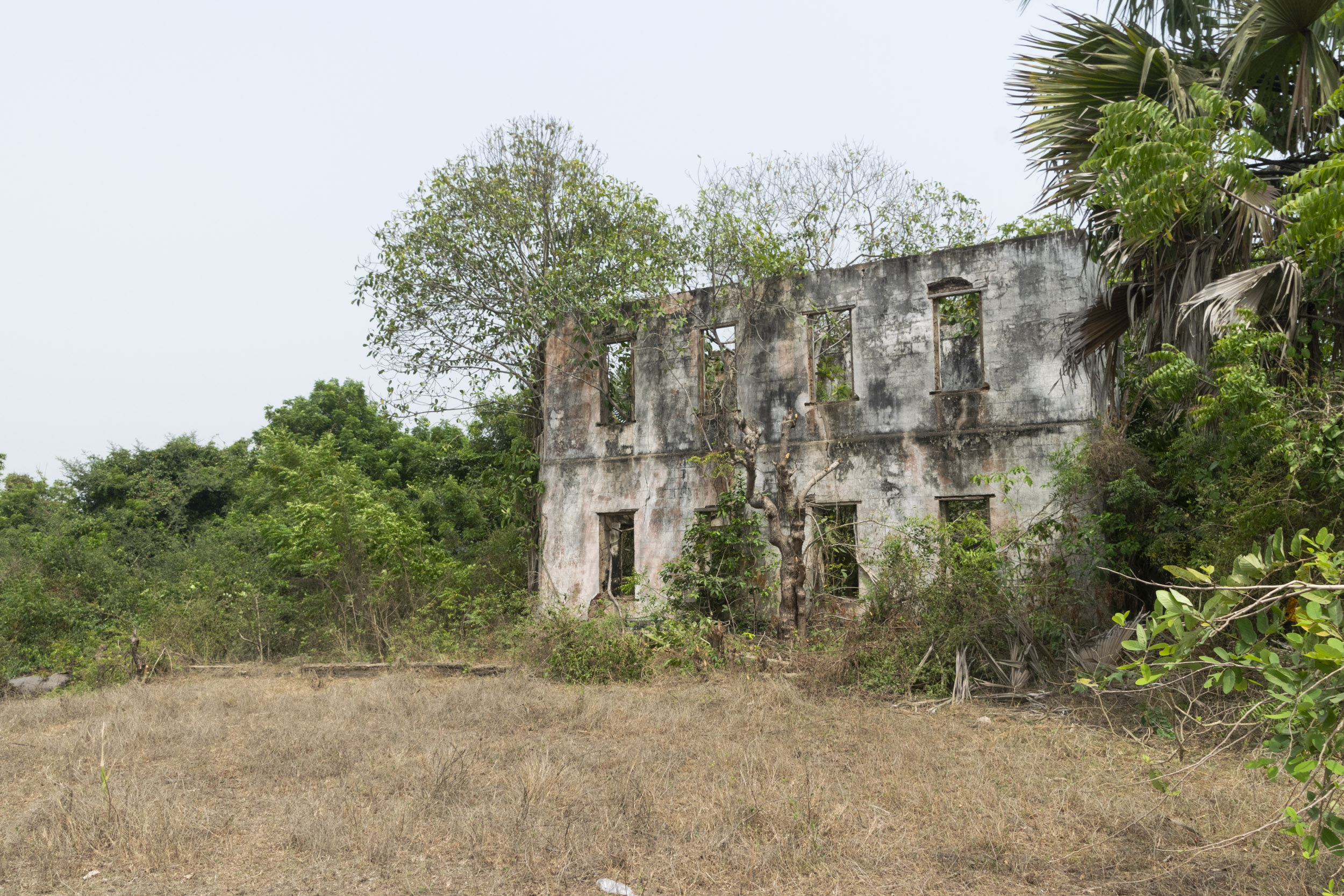
File:Missionary_Father's_House_Topo_Island_02.jpg

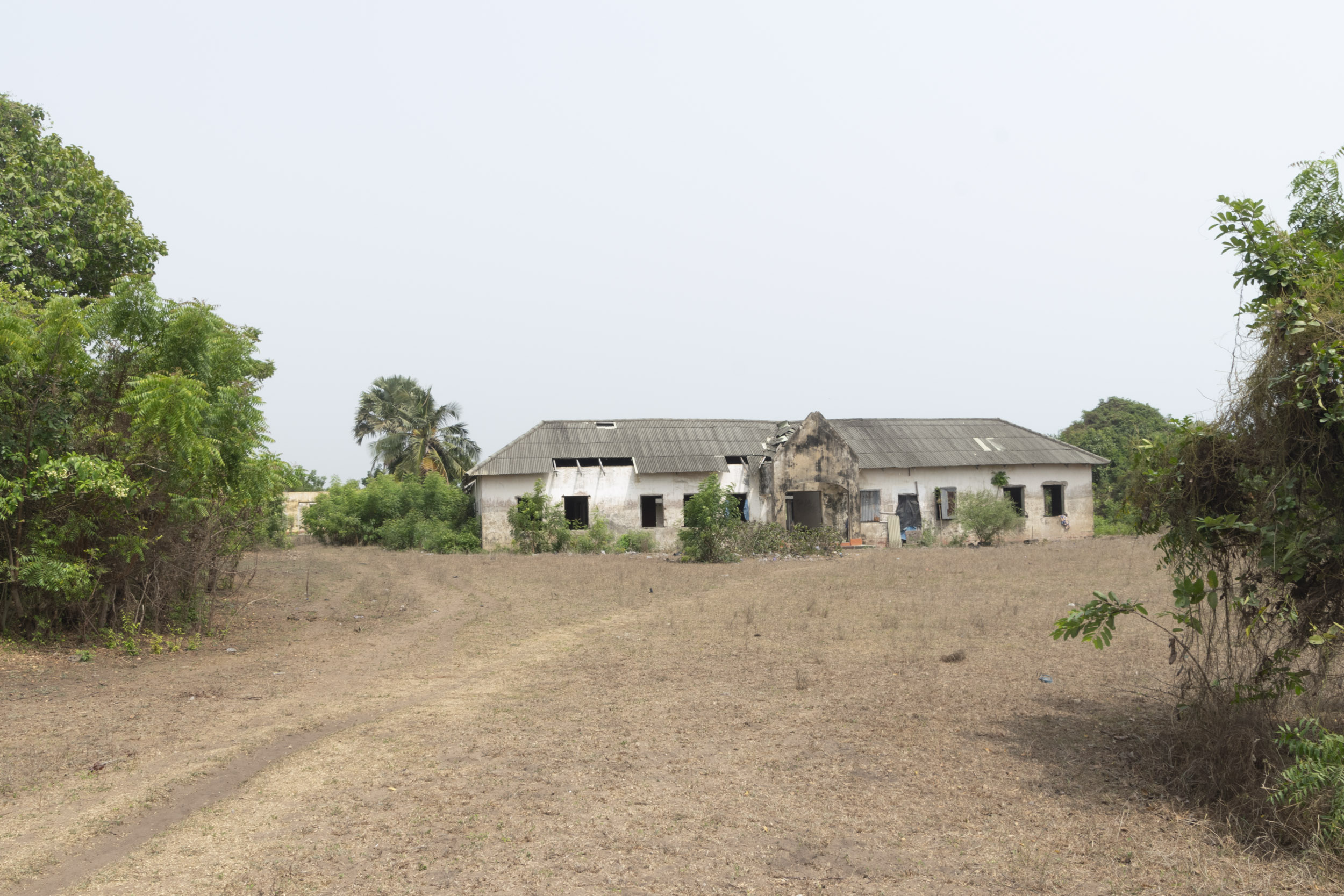
File:Missionary_Teacher_Training_College_Topo_Island.jpg

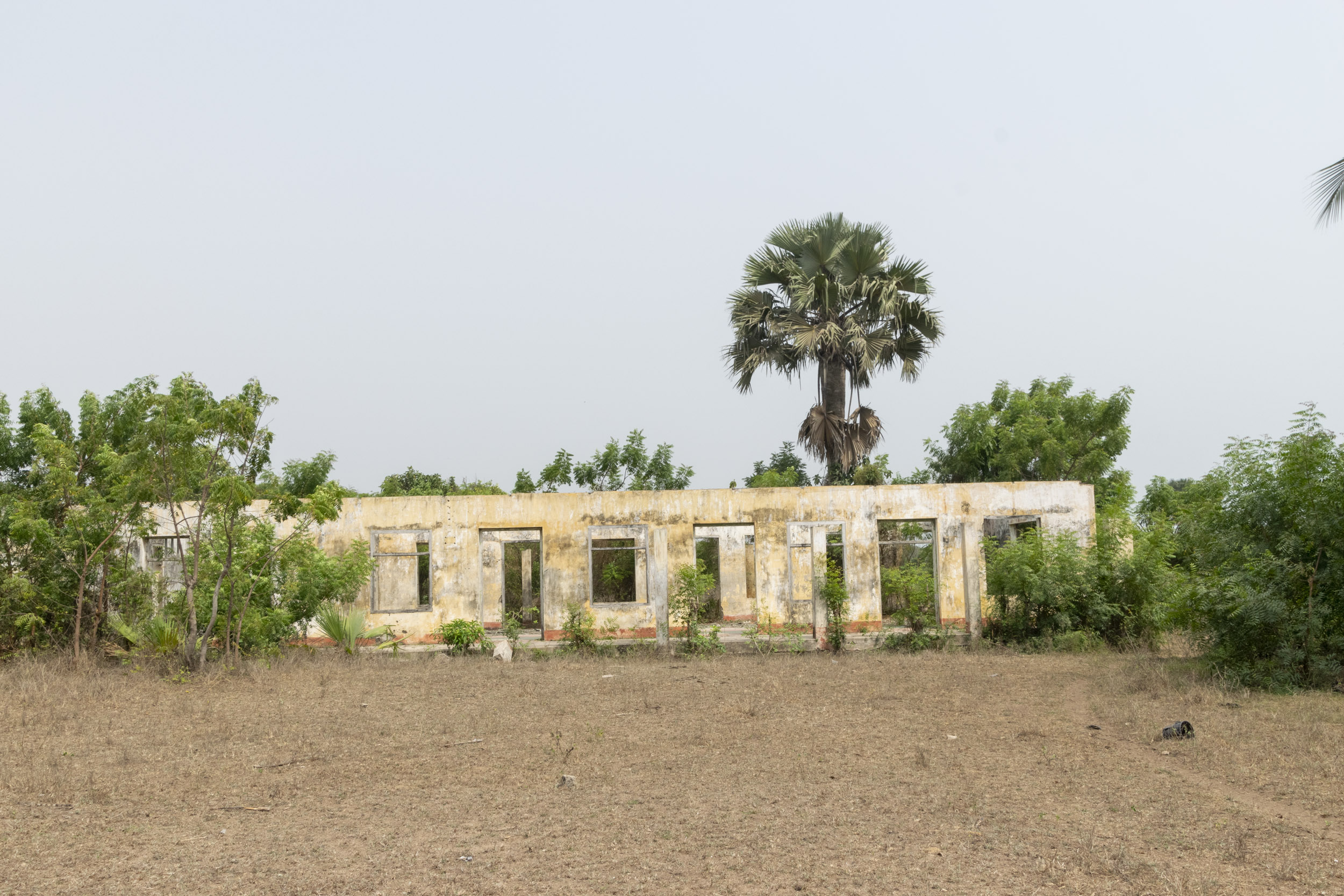
File:Missionary_Teacher_Training_College_Topo_Island_16.jpg

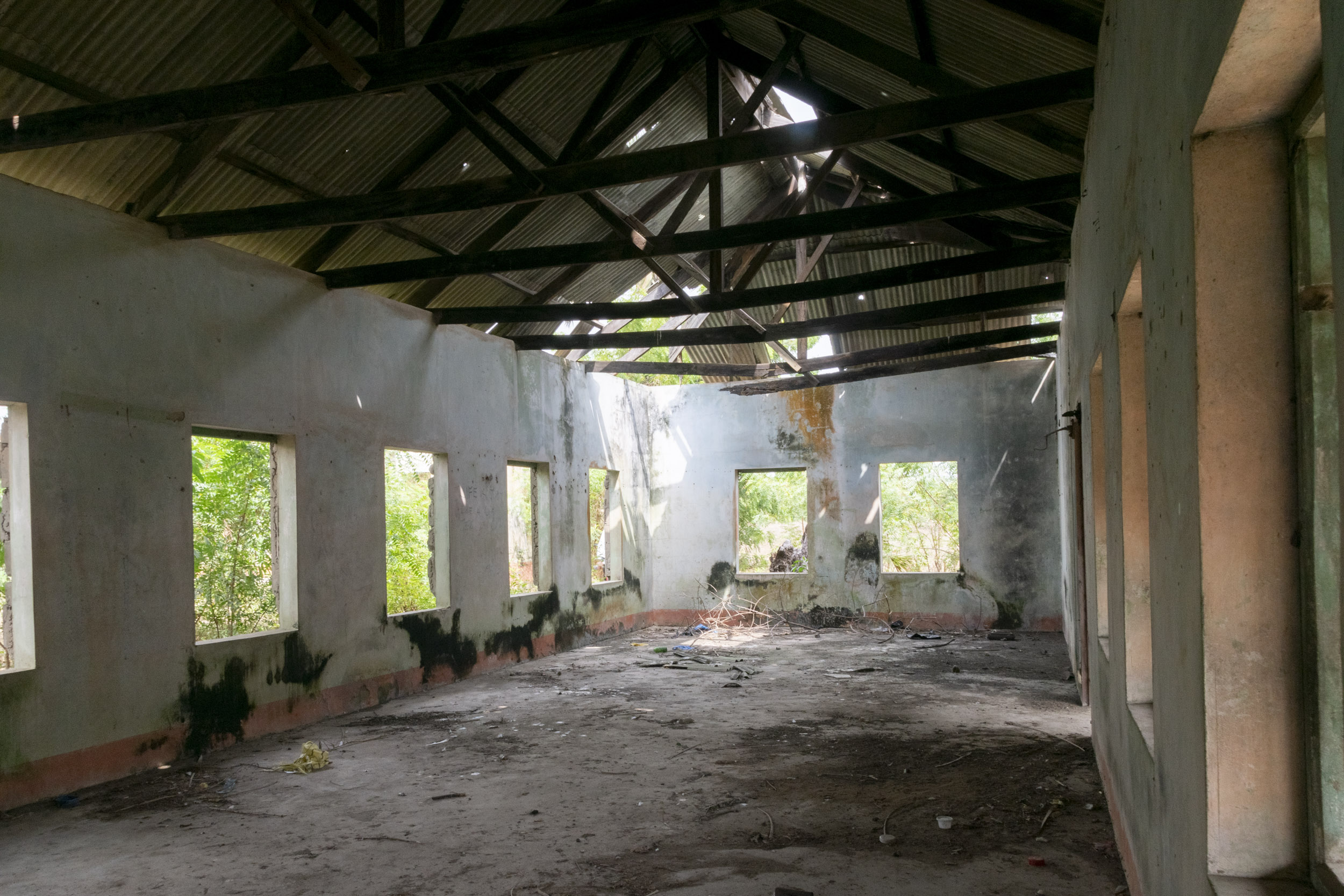
File:Missionary_Teacher_Training_College_Topo_Island_10.jpg

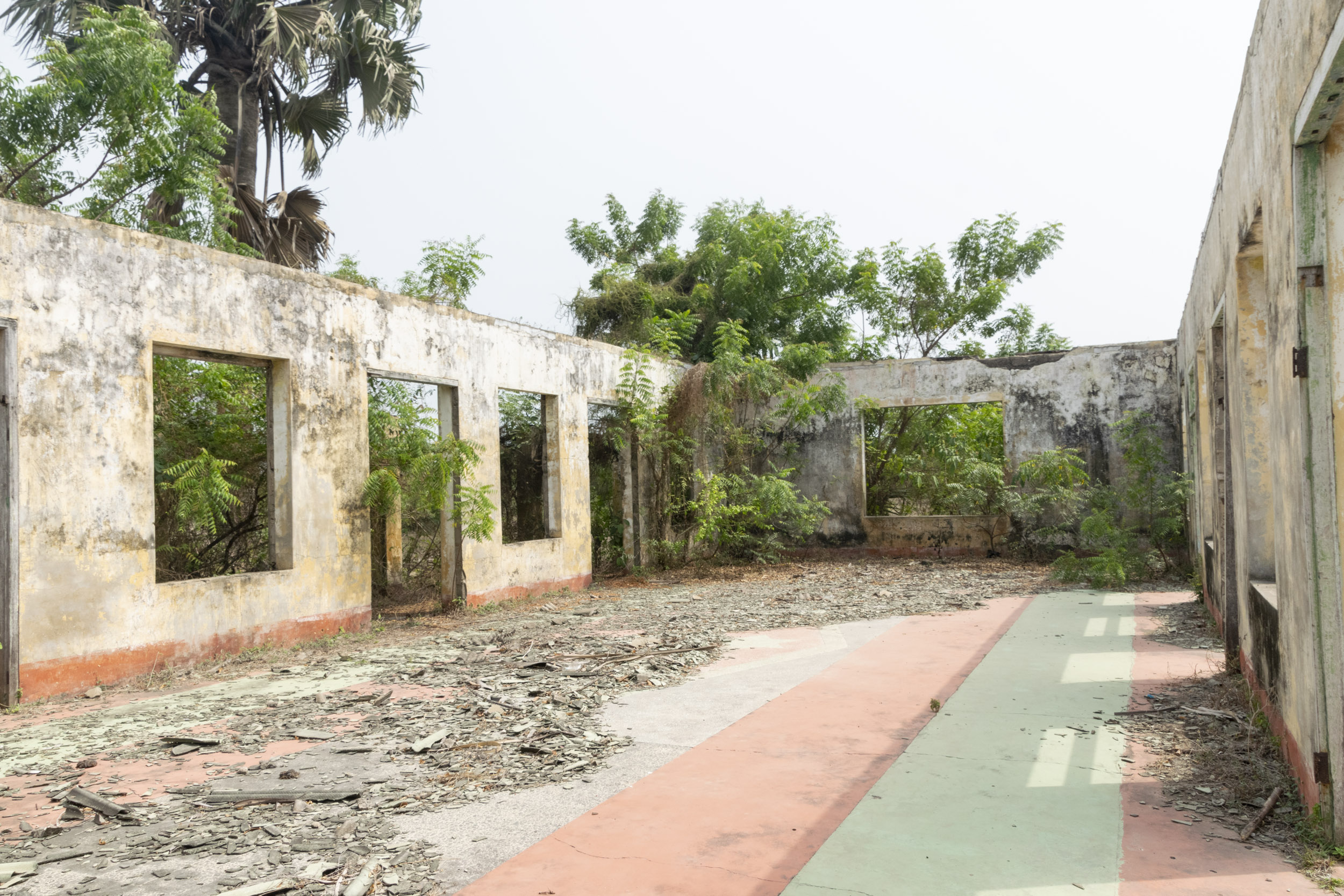
File:Missionary_Teacher_Training_College_Topo_Island_14.jpg

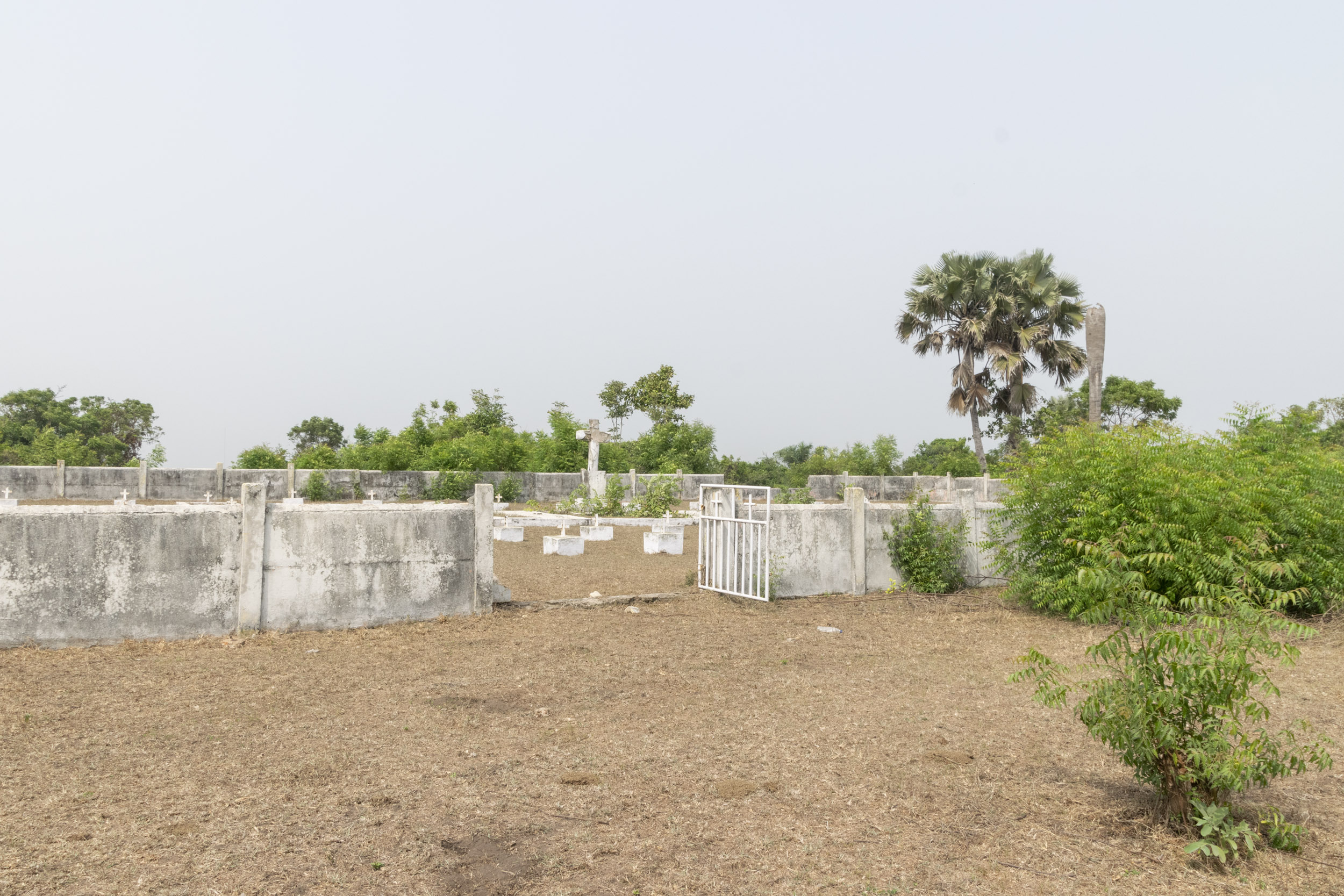
File:Missionary_Cemetery_on_Topo_Island.jpg

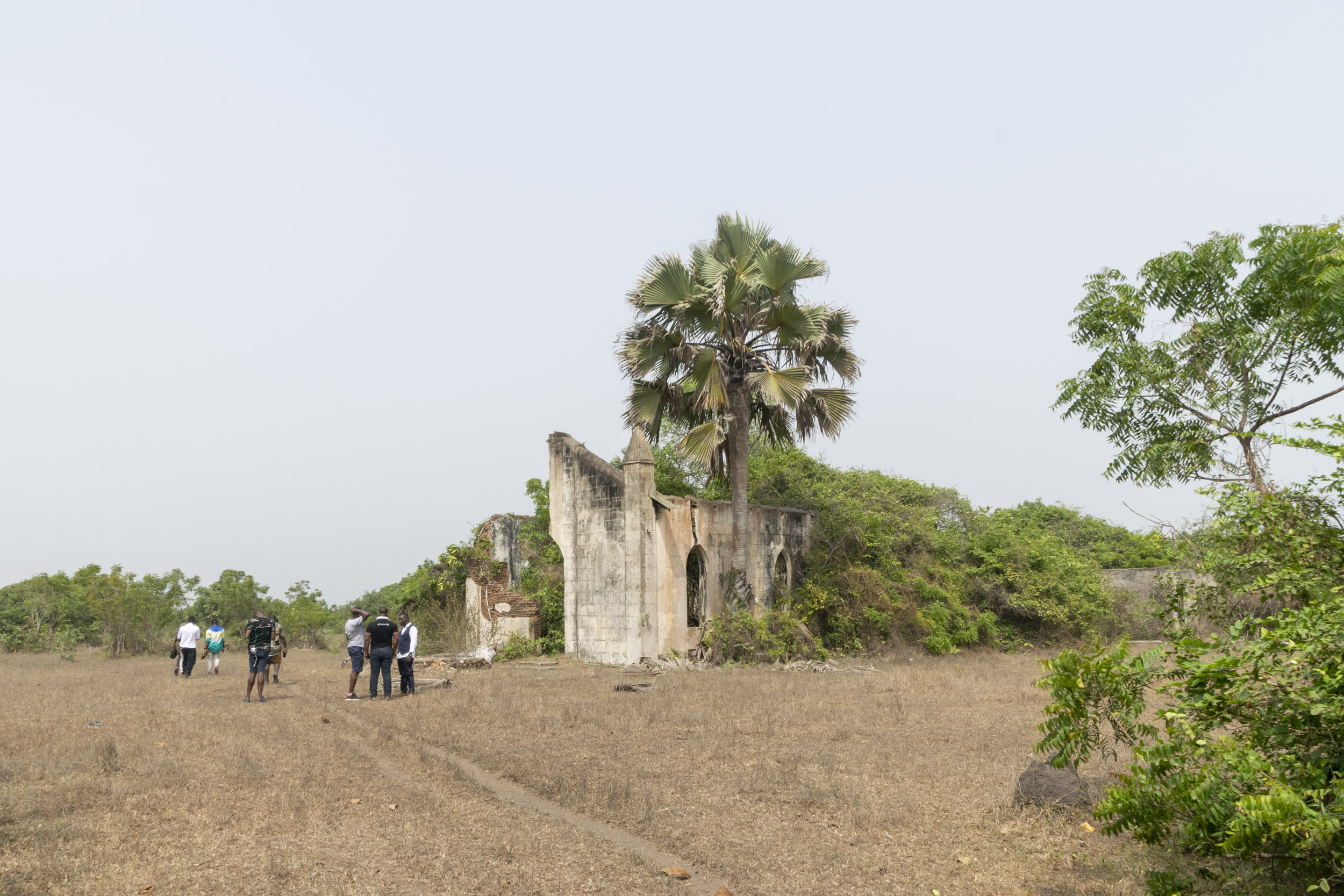
File:Missionary_Chapel_on_Topo_Island.jpg

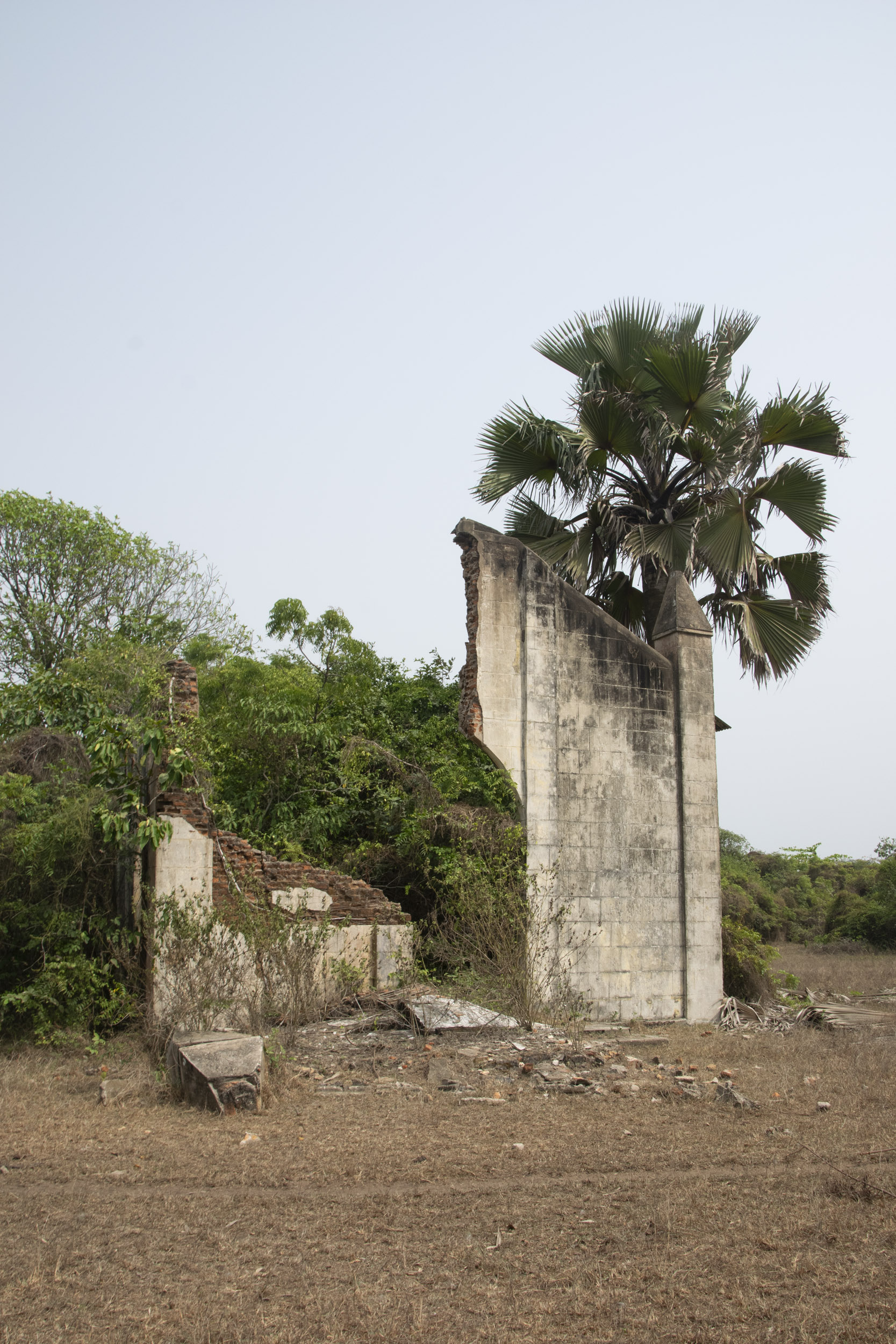
File:Missionary_Chapel_on_Topo_Island_04.jpg

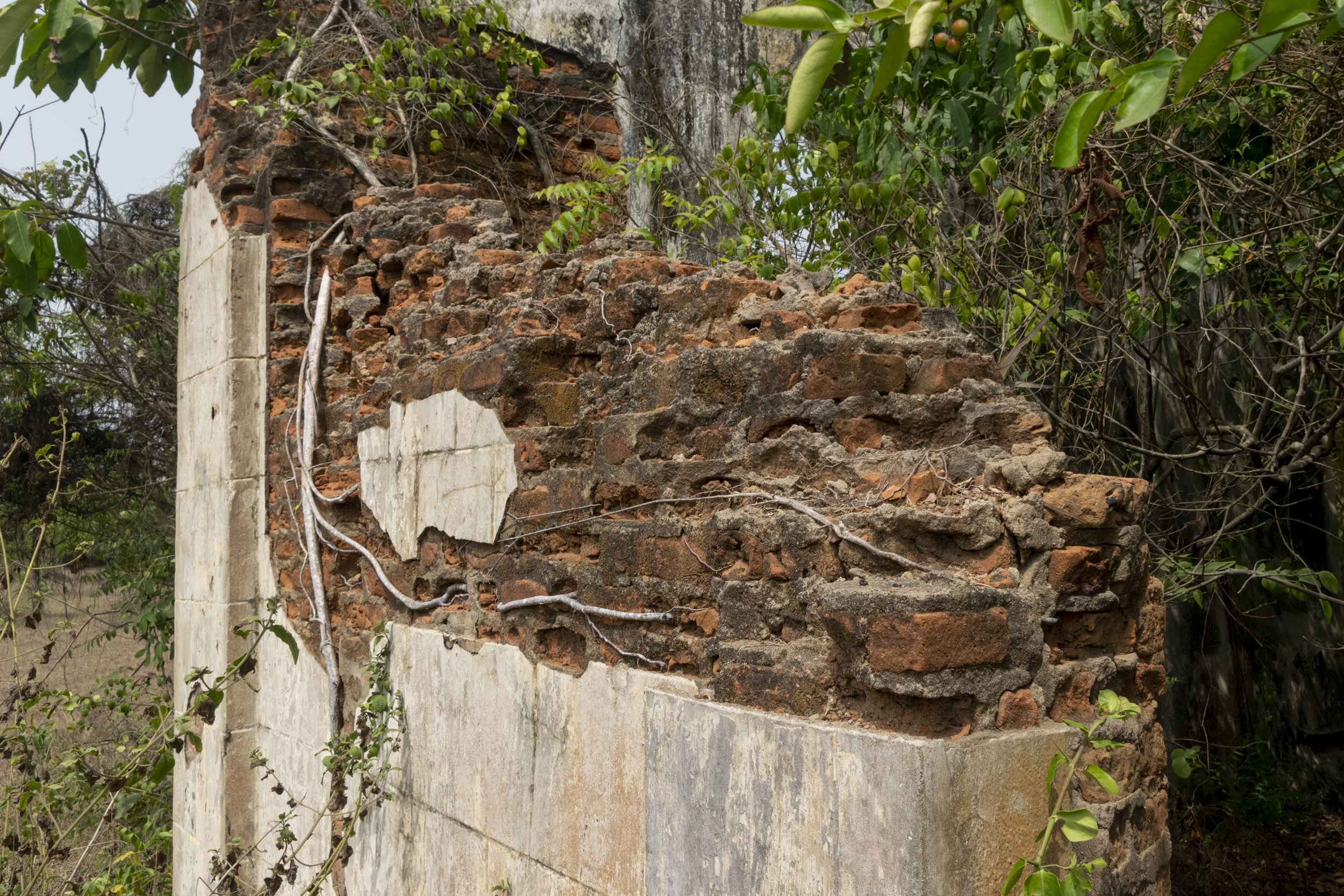
File:Wall_detail_of_Missionary_Chapel_on_Topo_Island.jpg

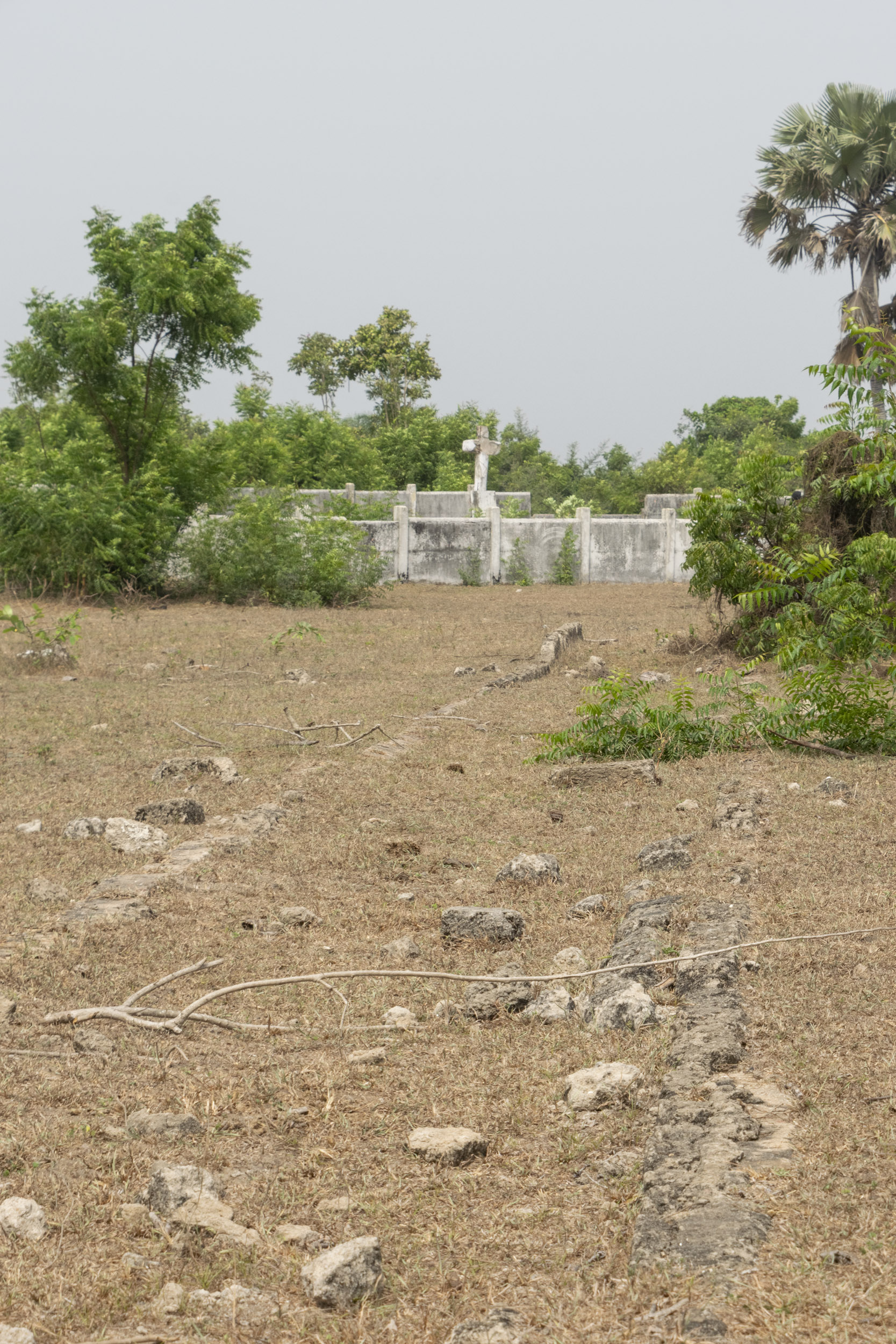
File:Remnants_of_walkway_built_by_The_Missionaries_on_Topo_Island_03.jpg

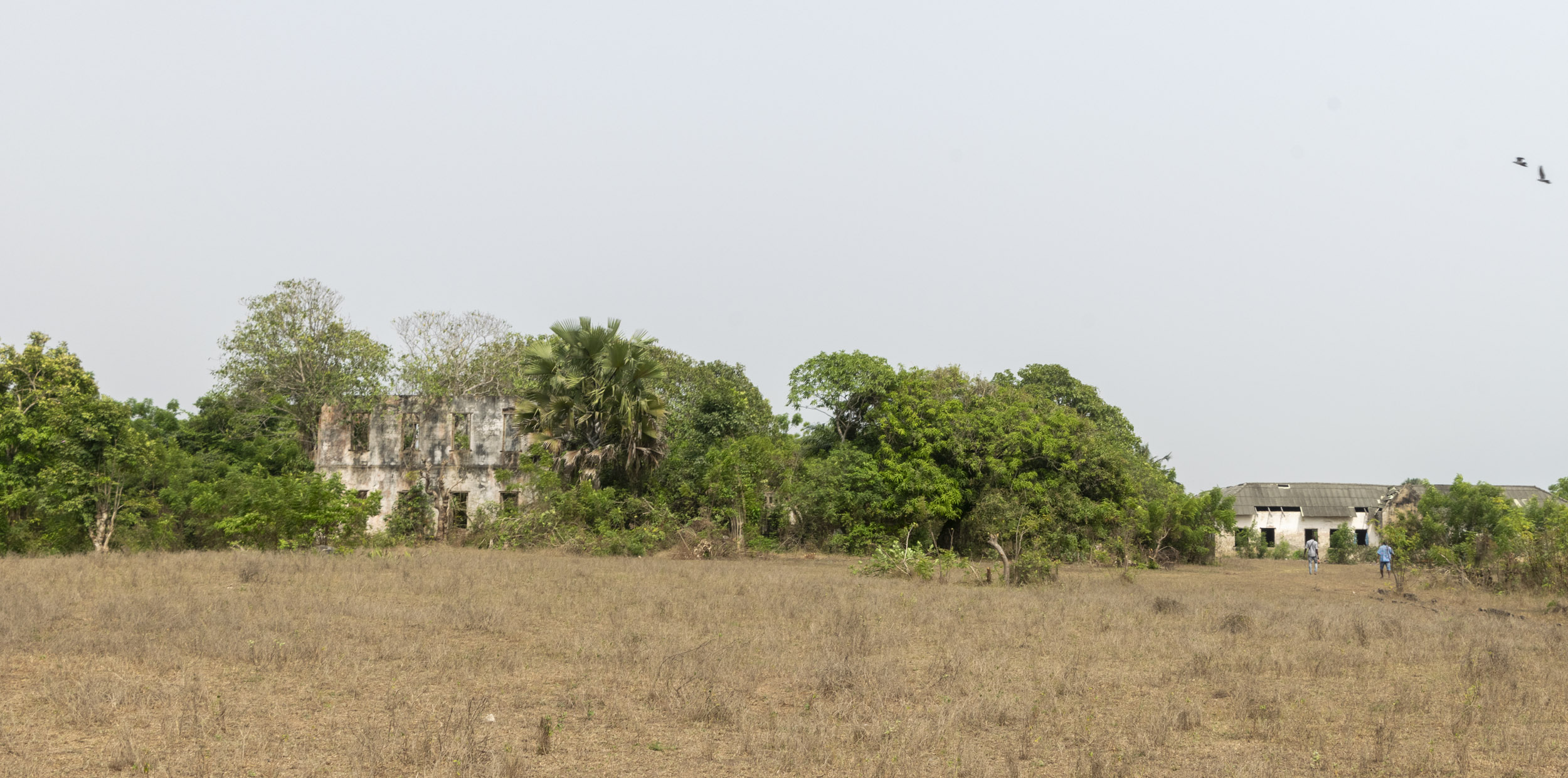
File:Missionary_Father's_house_and_Teacher_Training_College_on_Topo_Island.jpg
