= Anthony Sanusi =

- Bishop Emeritus of Ijebu-Ode
- Church: Roman Catholic Church
- Diocese: Ijebu-Ode
- In office: 1969 - 1990
- Predecessor: None
- Successor: Albert Ayinde Fasina
- Previous post: Priest

Orders
- Ordination: 17 December 1944

Personal details
- Born: 2 January 1911 Iperu, Nigeria
- Died: 8 December 2009 (aged 98)

Anthony Saliu Sanusi (2 January 1911 – 8 December 2009) was a Nigerian Bishop of the Roman Catholic Church.

Anthony Sanusi was born in Iperu, Colonial Nigeria in 1911. He was ordained a priest on 17 December 1944 in Lagos, Nigeria. He was appointed bishop of the new created diocese of Ijebu-Ode on 29 May 1969, and received his episcopal consecration on 1 August 1969. He remained bishop of Ijebu-Ode diocese until his retirement in 1990.

== See also ==
- Roman Catholic Diocese of Ijebu-Ode
