= Anthony Olubunmi Okogie =

Catholic cardinal

His Eminence Anthony Olubunmi Okogie
- Cardinal, Archbishop Emeritus of Lagos
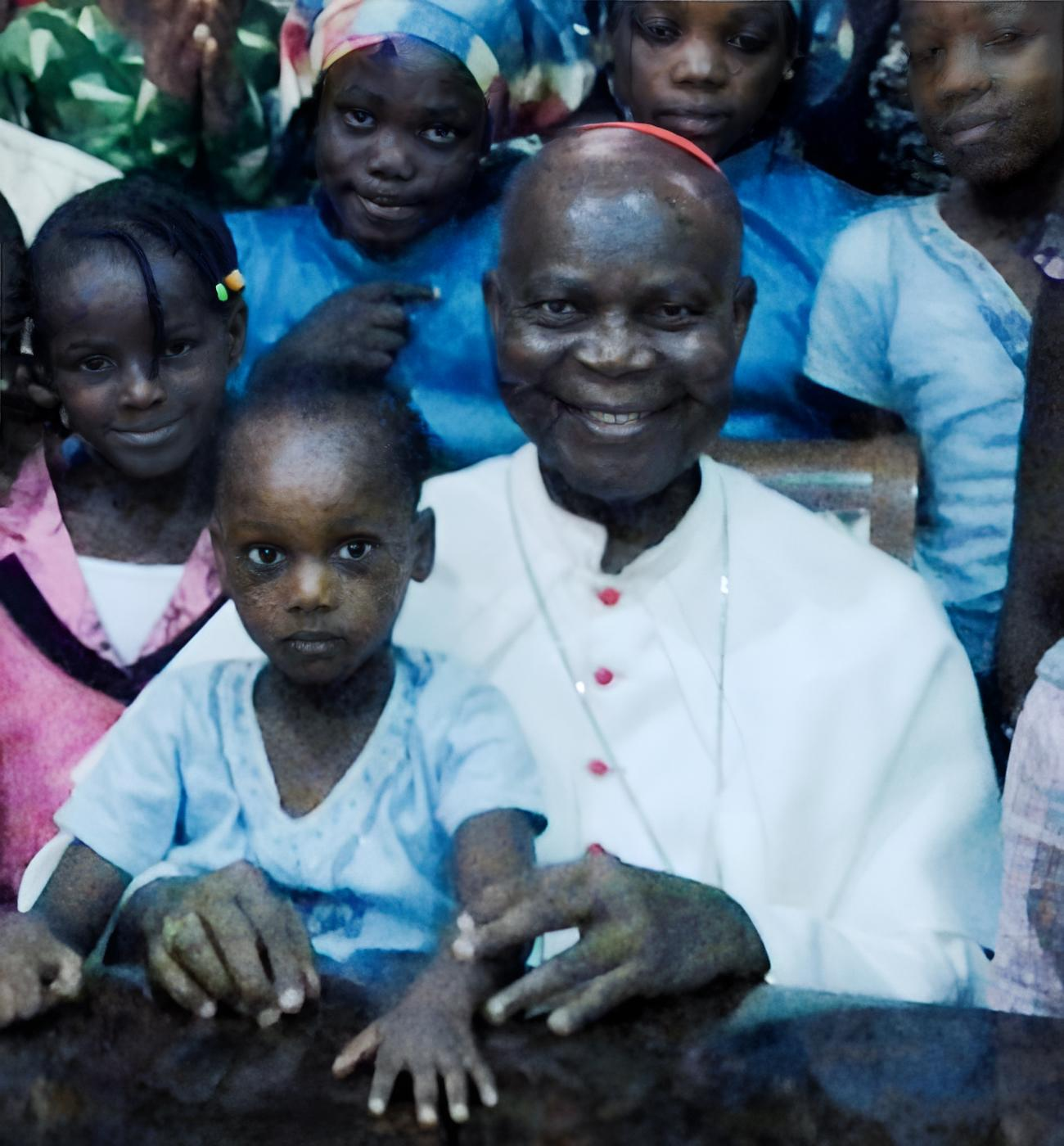
- Church: Catholic (Roman Rite)
- Archdiocese: Lagos
- Province: Lagos
- Metropolis: Lagos
- See: Lagos
- Appointed: 13 April 1973
- Retired: 25 May 2012
- Term ended: 25 May 2012
- Predecessor: John Kwao Amuzu Aggey
- Successor: Alfred Adewale Martins
- Other post: Cardinal-Priest of Beat Vergine Maria del Monte Carmelo a Mostacciano
- Previous posts: Auxiliary Bishop of Oyo (1971–1972); Titular Bishop of Mascula (1971–1973); Auxiliary Bishop of Lagos (1972–1973)

Orders
- Ordination: 11 December 1966 by John Kwao Amuzu Aggey
- Consecration: 29 August 1971 by Owen McCoy
- Created cardinal: 21 October 2003 by Pope John Paul II
- Rank: Cardinal-Priest

Personal details
- Born: Anthony Olubunmi Okogie; 16 June 1936 (age 90) Lagos, Nigeria
- Denomination: Catholic
- Parents: Prince Michael Okojie; Lucy Adunni Okojie (née Afolabi)
- Coat of arms

Styles of Anthony Olubumni Okogie
- Reference style: His Eminence
- Spoken style: Your Eminence
- Informal style: Cardinal
- See: Lagos

Anthony Olubunmi Okogie (born 16 June 1936) is a Nigerian Cardinal Priest and Archbishop Emeritus of Lagos in the Roman Catholic Church.

== Biography ==
Born in Lagos, Nigeria, Okogie was born to a royal family of Uromi in Edo State. His parents were Prince Michael Okojie - who was himself a son of King Ogbidi Okojie of Uromi - and Lucy Adunni Okojie (née Afolabi). His father was Esan and his mother was Yoruba. Okogie was ordained priest on 11 December 1966. He holds a licentiate in sacred theology, and had planned to study in Rome, but was called to Nigeria where he was a curate at the Holy Cross Cathedral. He was drafted into the Nigerian army, and served there as a chaplain. After another period of service at Holy Cross Cathedral, he was an instructor at King's College.

In 1971, he was consecrated Titular Bishop of Mascula and Auxiliary of Oyo, and in 1973 named archbishop. As archbishop, Okogie was president of the Christian Association of Nigeria, and from 1994 to 2000 headed the Bishops' Conference of Nigeria.

Cardinal Okogie volunteered to die in place of a Muslim woman who had been condemned to death by stoning by an Islamic court for adultery.

He was proclaimed Cardinal by Pope John Paul II in the consistory of 21 October 2003, and holds the title of Cardinal Priest of Santa Maria del Monte Carmelo a Mostacciano (or in English Blessed Virgin Mary of Mt. Carmel of Mostacciano). During his cardinalate, Okogie was one of the cardinal electors who participated in the 2005 papal conclave that selected Pope Benedict XVI. Cardinal Okogie was also one of the cardinal electors who participated in the 2013 papal conclave that elected Pope Francis. During the opening day of the 2013 conclave, Cardinal Okogie was notable in that he was the one cardinal who was in a wheelchair during most of the proceedings, standing up only when it came time for him to walk towards the gospels and make the cardinal electors' oath. During the procession and entry into the conclave, Cardinal Okogie was the one cardinal from the Latin Church who did not wear the mozzetta.

His resignation from the pastoral governance of the see of Lagos because of having reached the age limit of 75 years was accepted on 25 May 2012.

== Views ==
=== Condoms ===
In 2007, he condemned the government approval of a condom factory.

=== Celibacy ===
Cardinal Okogie has defended the Catholic Church's laws on celibacy for Catholic priests.

Catholic Church titles
Preceded by Francis Anani Kofi Lodonu	— TITULAR — Titular Bishop of Mascula; 5 June 1971 – 13 April 1973	Succeeded by Jan Bernard Szlaga
Preceded by John Kwao Amuzu Aggey	Metropolitan Archbishop of Lagos; 13 April 1973 – 25 May 2012	Succeeded by Alfred Adewale Martins
Preceded by Gabriel Gonsum Ganaka	President of the Nigerian Episcopal Conference; 1988 – 1994	Succeeded by Albert Kanene Obiefuna
Preceded by John Baptist Wu Cheng-chung	Cardinal-Priest of Beata Vergine Maria del Monte Carmelo a Mostacciano; 21 October 2003 –	Incumbent
