= Rail transport in Nigeria =

Railways in Nigeria consist of a 3,505 km (2,178 mi) 3 ft 6 in (1,067 mm) national railway network and 669 km (416 mi) of 1,435 mm (4 ft 8 1/2 in). There are also plans for a 4,000 km (2,500 mi) SG high-speed railway network. The Cape gauge network is in poor condition due to lack of maintenance. In 2019, the single operational standard gauge line from Abuja to Kaduna generated as much revenue as the entire Cape gauge railway network combined. The Nigerian government plans to extend the standard gauge to replace most of the Western Line, while the Eastern Line will be rehabilitated as a Cape gauge line. All trains in Nigeria are operated by the Nigerian Railway Corporation.

The first railway line in the country was constructed in 1891 between Lagos and Ibadan under the British colonial administration. Its primary purpose was to facilitate the exploitation of Nigeria's natural resources, such as tin, coal, and petroleum. The railway was also intended to promote trade between Nigeria and other countries, making the train port trade a major part of Nigeria's colonial economy. The railway network expanded over the next few decades, and by the time Nigeria gained independence in 1960, there were over 3,000 kilometres (1,900 miles) of railway lines in the country.

In 2022, Nigerian Railway Corporation transported 3.21 million passengers, an increase of 18.36% from the previous year. However, revenues fell by 20% to 4.55 billion naira.

== Railway network ==
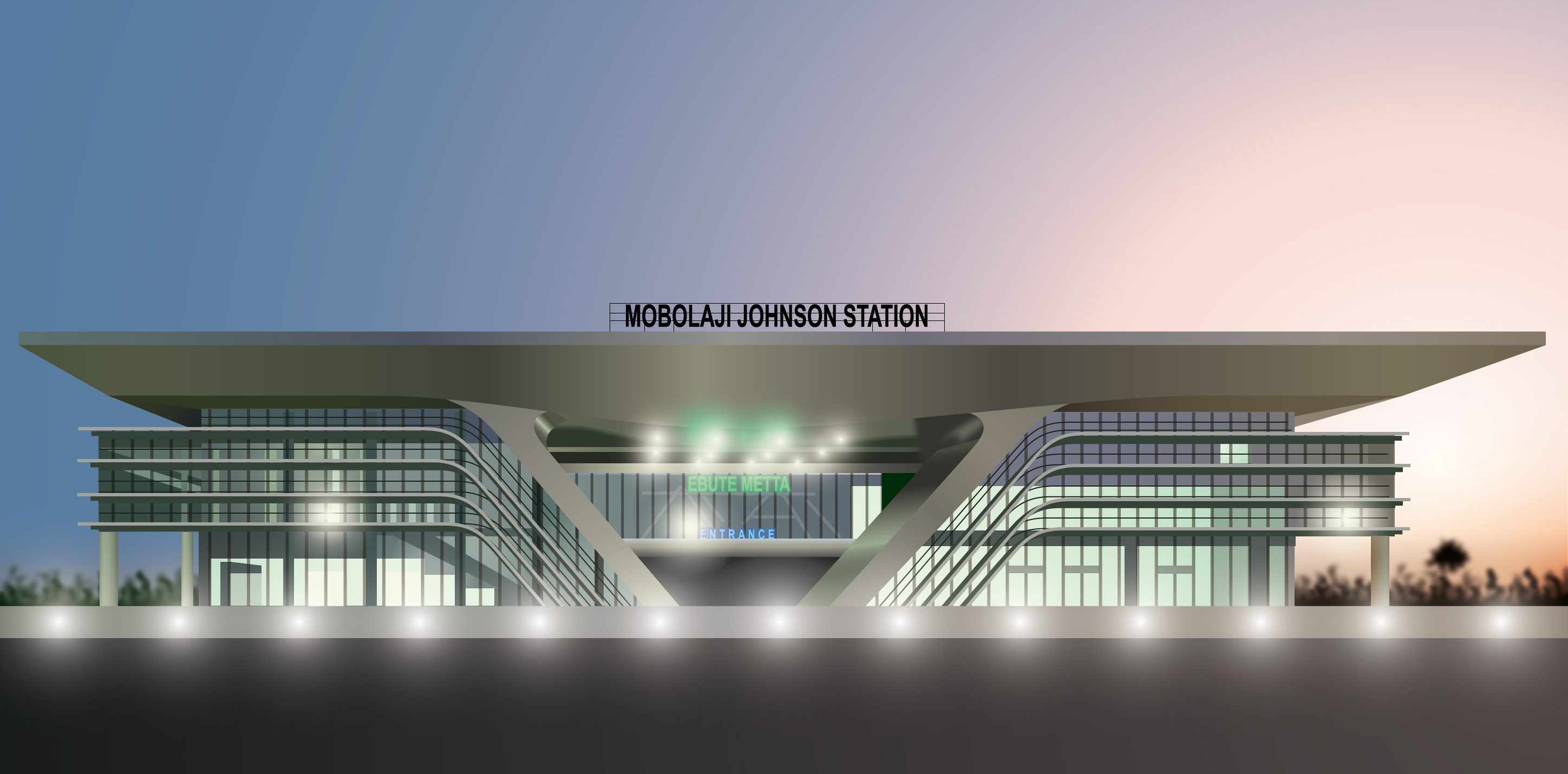
Main railway station Lagos in Ebute Metta

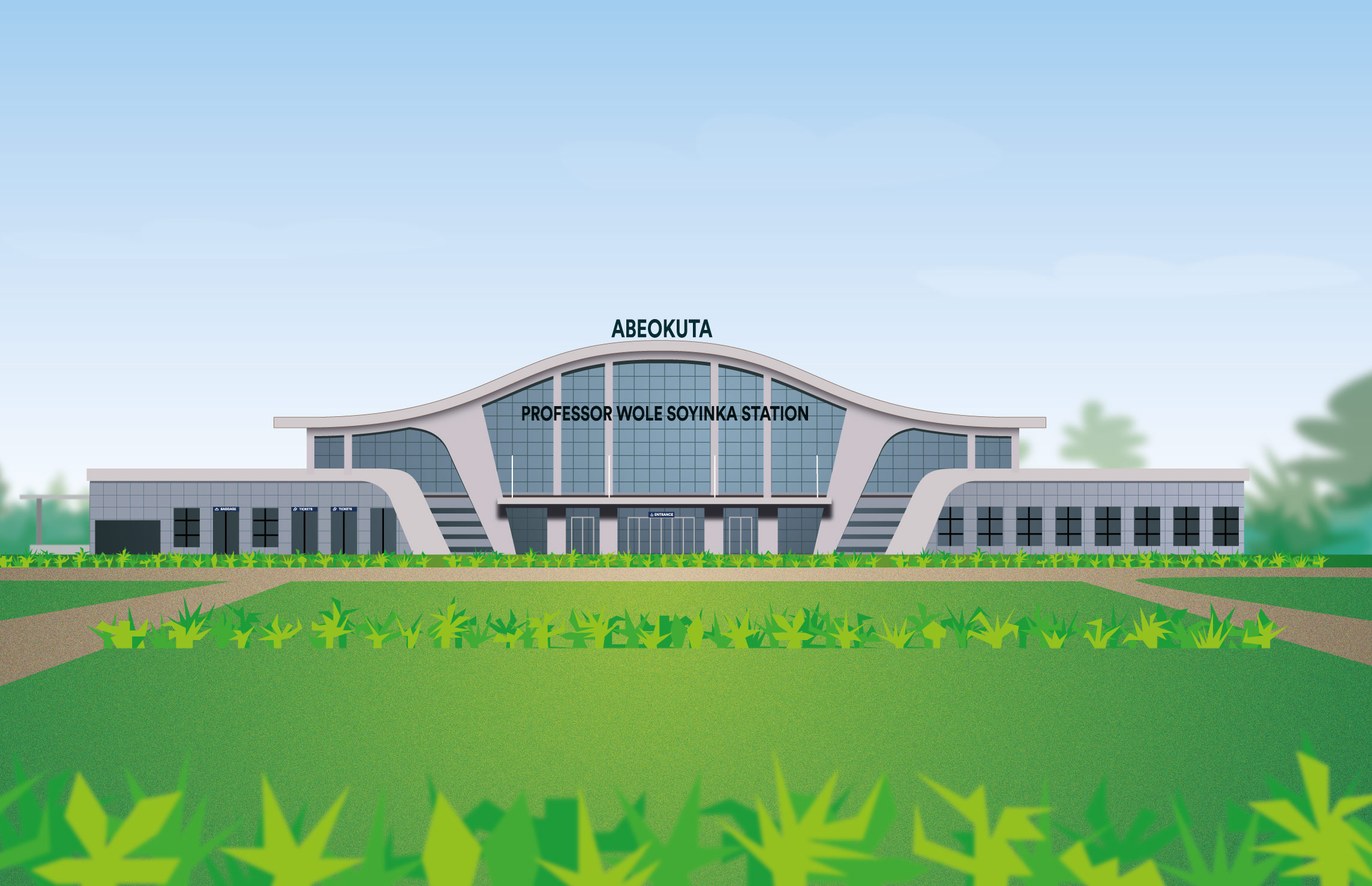
New railway station in Abeokuta

=== Cape gauge ===
80% of the current Nigerian railways were originally built by the colonial power, Great Britain. The railways were built to the 1,067 mm (3 ft 6 in) Cape gauge, the same track gauge used in most other British colonies in Africa.

The country has two major Cape gauge rail lines:

- The Western Line connects Lagos on the Bight of Benin to Nguru in the northern state of Yobe, over a distance of 1,126 kilometers (700 mi).
- The Eastern Line connects Port Harcourt in the Southeast to Maiduguri in the northeastern state of Borno, near the border with Chad.

There are also several branch lines:

- The Linking Line connects Kaduna on the Western Line to Kafanchan on the Eastern Line.
- Ifaw–Ilaro (Western Line), 20 km (12 mi)
- Minna–Baro (Western Line), 150 km (93 mi)
- Zaria–Kaura Namoda (Western Line), 245 km (152 mi).
- Kuru–Jos (Eastern Line), 55 km (34 mi)
- Baro-Kano Railway Station (Northern Line), 200 km (120 mi).

The NRC network does not yet connect to the rail network of neighbouring states. However, in February 2021, construction began on a cape-gauge link from Kano to Maradi, the second-largest city in Niger, under the auspices of Portugal's Mota-Engil SGPS SA, with planned inauguration in 2023, which will be one of the first rail lines in Niger.

=== Standard gauge lines ===
In 2006, the government contracted with the China Civil Engineering Construction Corporation (CCECC) to build the Lagos–Kano Standard Gauge Railway. It was later decided to complete the project in segments due to a lack of funds. After many delays, the segment from Abuja to Kaduna (187 km) opened officially on 26 July 2016. The total cost was US$870 million. The line, which begins in Idu, 20 km (12 mi) west of central Abuja, requires two hours of travel time for trains with a maximum speed of 100 km/h (62 mph). In August 2020, NRC reported that about 50% of the revenue of its entire rail network (about 4,000 km) would be generated by the standard gauge Abuja–Kaduna line. Nigerians like to take the train between the capital Abuja and the next largest city Kaduna because the highway between the two cities is a constant target for muggers. A train journey is thus the safer alternative to a car for residents of both cities.

The Warri–Itakpe Railway was begun in 1987 as Nigeria's first standard gauge railway, but was only completed in 2020 – after the Abuja–Kaduna line had already opened. The line was conceived as an industrial railway to supply the Ajaokuta Steel Mill with iron ore from Itakpe and metallurgical coal imported through the port of Warri. Although construction was originally planned to be completed in five years, sporadic funding stretched out the construction period over more than 30 years. In August 2017, the Minister of Transportation announced that the railway would be completed by the China Civil Engineering Construction Corporation and Julius Berger. On 29 September 2020, the Warri–Itakpe Railway was officially inaugurated by President Muhammadu Buhari in a virtual ceremony. Passenger trains have been running on the standard gauge line since October 2020 and freight trains since April 2021. Construction is underway on an extension to Abuja, where it will connect with the Abuja–Kaduna section of the Lagos–Kano Standard Gauge Railway.

The 157 km (98 mi) Lagos–Ibadan section began construction in March 2017 and was inaugurated on 10 June 2021. It is the first double-track standard gauge line in West Africa. A Lagos–Ibadan journey takes two and a half hours, half as long as the equivalent car journey. All compartments (standard class, business class and first class) are air-conditioned and have three overhead screens. The window seats are equipped with power outlets and USB charging stations. Criticisms include the fact that tickets are not available online and only for cash payment, and that there are only three trips a day in each direction. There is praise for the punctuality and cleanliness of the trains. The "Red Line" of Lagos' Mass Rail Transit, which is currently under construction, will share the same corridor and right-of-way with the Lagos–Ibadan rail line.

Modern station buildings have been constructed along all new standard gauge lines. The new main station of Lagos, Mobolaji Johnson, for example, offers air-conditioned waiting rooms, handicapped access to the tracks, airport-like display boards of departure times, clean toilets, trained personnel for medical emergencies, etc.

=== 762 mm railways ===
The 762 mm (2 ft 6 in) gauge Bauchi Light Railway operated between Zaria and Bukuru over a distance 230 km (143 mi) and was opened in stages between 1912 and 1914. In 1927 the 16 km (10 mi) section between Jos and Bukuru was converted to 1,067 mm (3 ft 6 in) becoming part of the Kafanchan to Jos branch line. The 2 ft 6in Zaria–Jos section continued to operate until 1957 when it was abandoned.

There was also the short-lived 762 mm (2 ft 6 in) gauge Wushishi Tramway which connected Wushishi with Zungeru (19 kilometres or 12 miles) in 1901 and which was extended in 1902 from Wushishi to Bari-Juko (16 kilometres or 10 miles). It closed circa 1911 with its two Hunslet built 0-6-2T locomotives being transferred to the Bauchi Light Railway.

Mention must also be made of the Lagos Steam Tramway (1902) and the Lagos Sanitary Tramway (1906), both of 762 mm (2 ft 6 in) gauge.

=== Proposed high-speed network ===
A proposed 4,000 km (2,500 mi) high-speed railway network has received 90% of regulatory approvals as of October 2025. Abuja-based firm De-Sadel and its partner China Liancai Petroleum Investment Holdings have presented plans totalling $60 billion.

The first phase of the project is intended to connect Lagos via Abuja to Kano and Abuja to Port Harcourt. During the second phase, two east-west lines will be constructed: one along the coast and another in the north, connecting Kebbi State via Kano to Borno State. The third phase will see the construction of a central east-west line from Kaduna to Adamawa State.

== History ==
=== Construction ===
The construction of railways in Nigeria started from Lagos Colony to Ibadan in March 1896, by the British government.

The Lagos Government Railway began operations in March 1901 and was extended to Minna in 1911, where it met the Baro–Kano Railway Station that was built by the government of Northern Nigeria between 1907 and 1911. The two lines were amalgamated in 1912 into the Government Department of Railways, the predecessor to the Nigerian Railway Corporation. The railway reached its northeastern terminus of Nguru in 1930.

After coal was discovered at Udi, the Eastern Railway was built to Port Harcourt between 1913 and 1916. This railway was extended to Kaduna via Kafanchan in 1927, connecting the Eastern Railway to the Lagos–Kano Railway. The Eastern Railway was extended to its northeastern terminus of Maiduguri between 1958 and 1964.

=== Decline ===
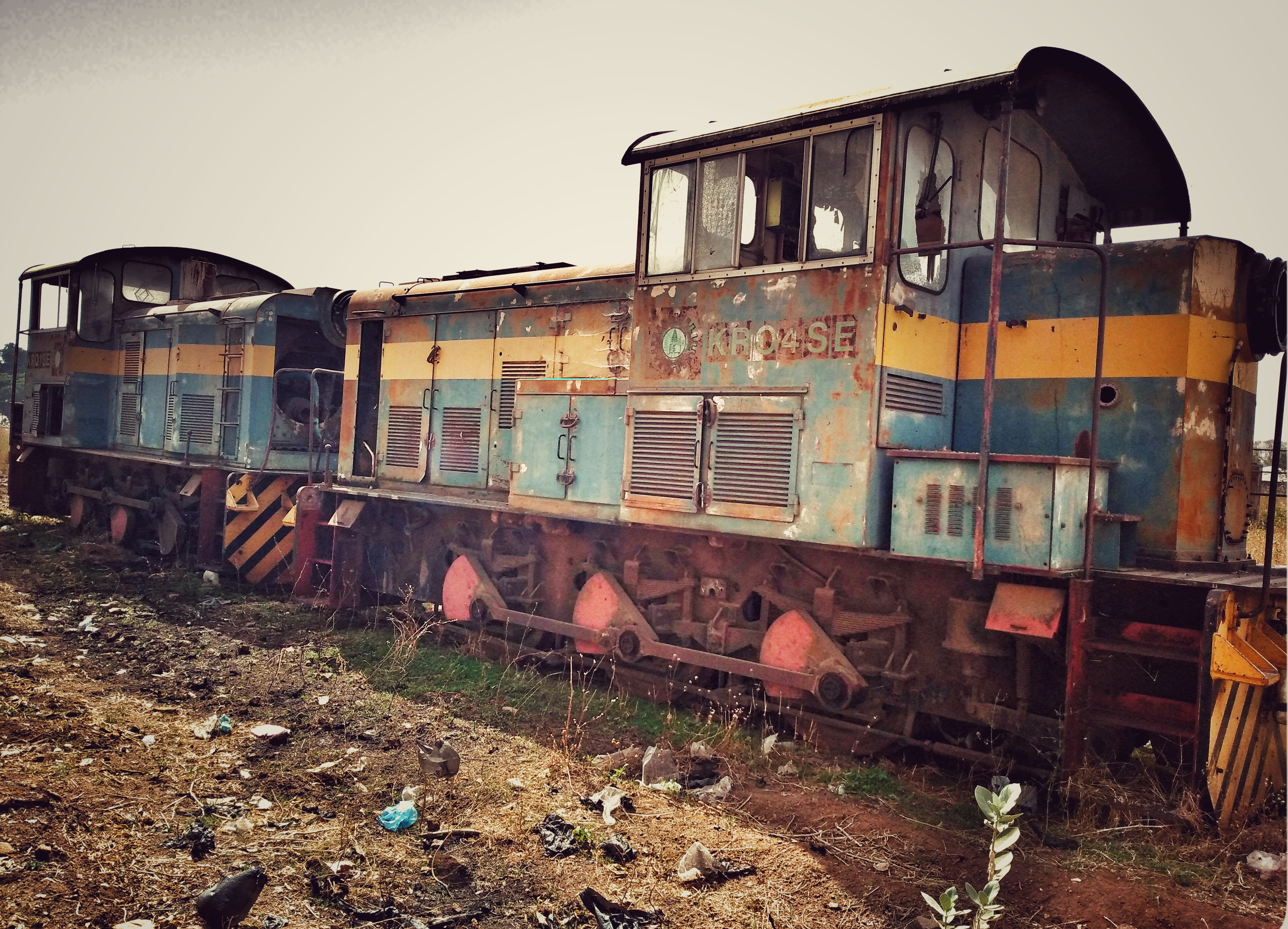
Abandoned locomotive.

Years of neglect of both the rolling stock and the right-of-way have seriously reduced the capacity and utility of the system. Couplings of the ABC (Automatic Buffing Contact Coupler) kind, vacuum brakes and non-roller bearing plain axles are also obsolete. By early 2013, the only operational segment of Nigeria's rail network was between Lagos and Kano. Passenger trains took 31 hours to complete the journey at an average speed of 45 km/h (28 mph).

Passenger traffic
Year	Passengers
1964	11,288,000
1974	4,342,000
1978	6,700,000
1984	15,500,000
1991	3,000,000
2003	1,600,000
2022	3,212,948
2023	2,182,388

Freight traffic
Year	Freight (tonnes)
1964	2,960,000
1974	1,098,000
2000	< 100,000

=== Rehabilitation ===
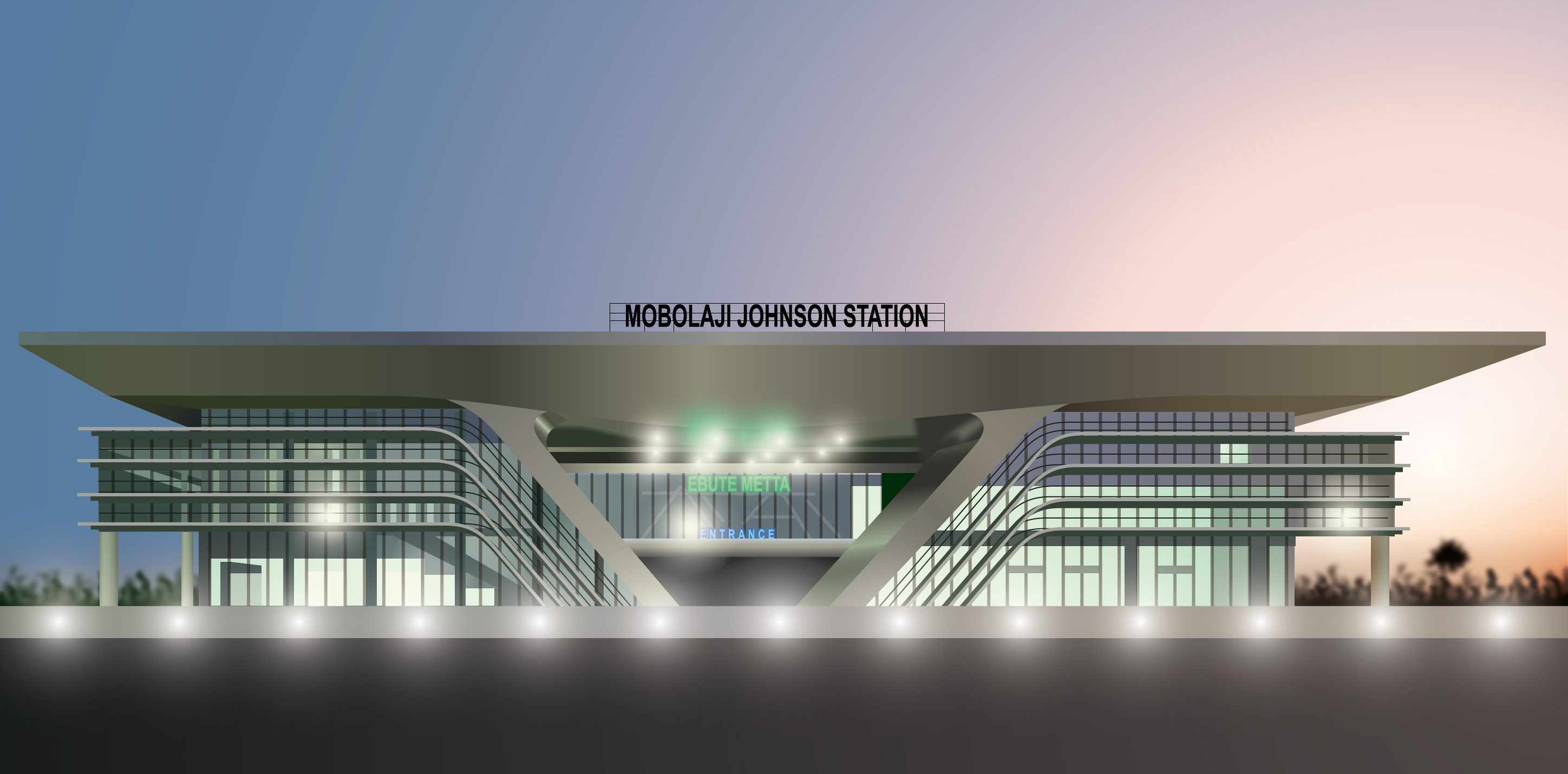
Train station Mobolaji Johnson, artistic impression

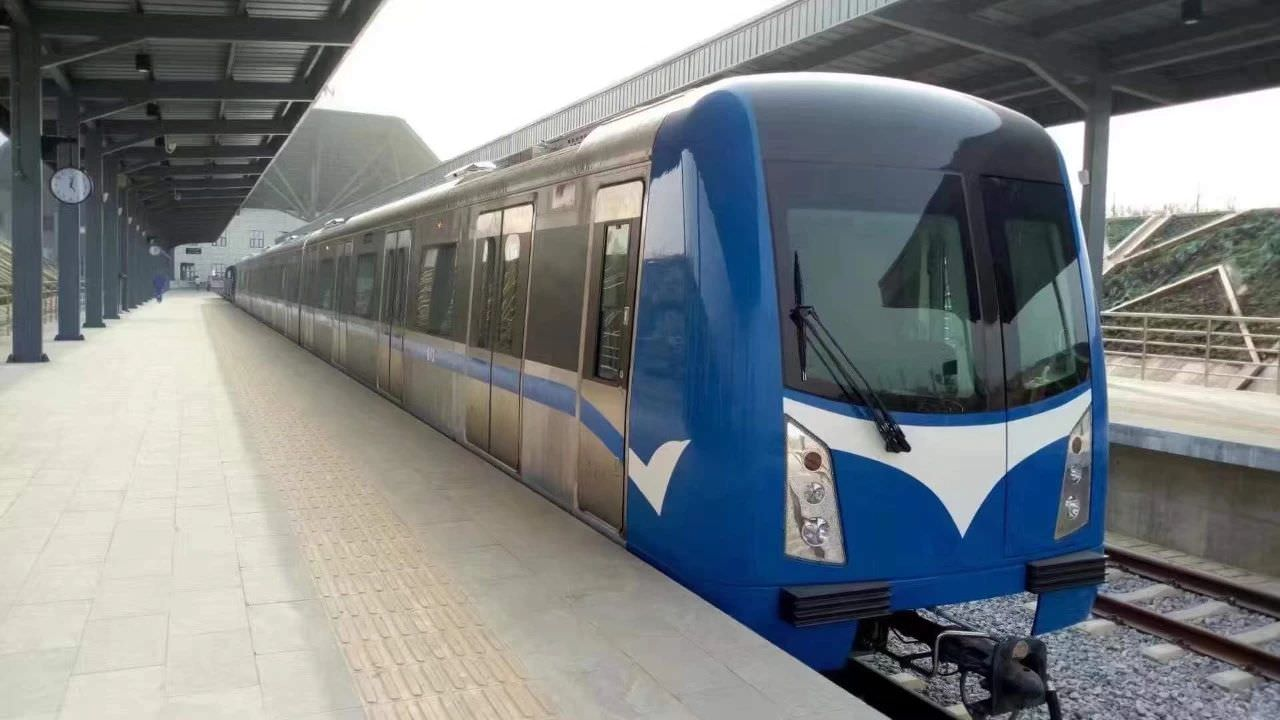
Abuja VLT

A project to restore Nigeria's railways has been underway since 2009. The eastern line from Port Harcourt to Maiduguri was restored at a cost of US$427 million by Lingo Nigeria, Eser West Africa, and the China Gezhouba Group.

In order to remedy the poor condition, efficiency, and profitability of the nation's railroads, the government is also seeking to privatize the Nigerian Railway Corporation. Under the privatization plan, the railways will be split into three concessions, each to be awarded for a period of 25–30 years.

In 2019, the Cape gauge railways had only 15 functional locomotives. The 187 km Abuja–Kaduna line generated as much revenue in 2019 as the entire 3,505 km (2,178 mi) Cape gauge railway network combined.

== Metro systems ==
Several metro systems are active or under construction:

- Abuja Light Rail, opened in late 2017
- Lagos Rail Mass Transit, opened in September 2023
- Rivers Monorail in Port Harcourt
- Calabar Monorail
- Kaduna State Light rail

== Maps ==
=== National/Intercity Routes ===
Existing network (currently operating routes in red)

=== Abuja Metro routes ===
Abuja lightrail

=== Lagos Metro routes ===
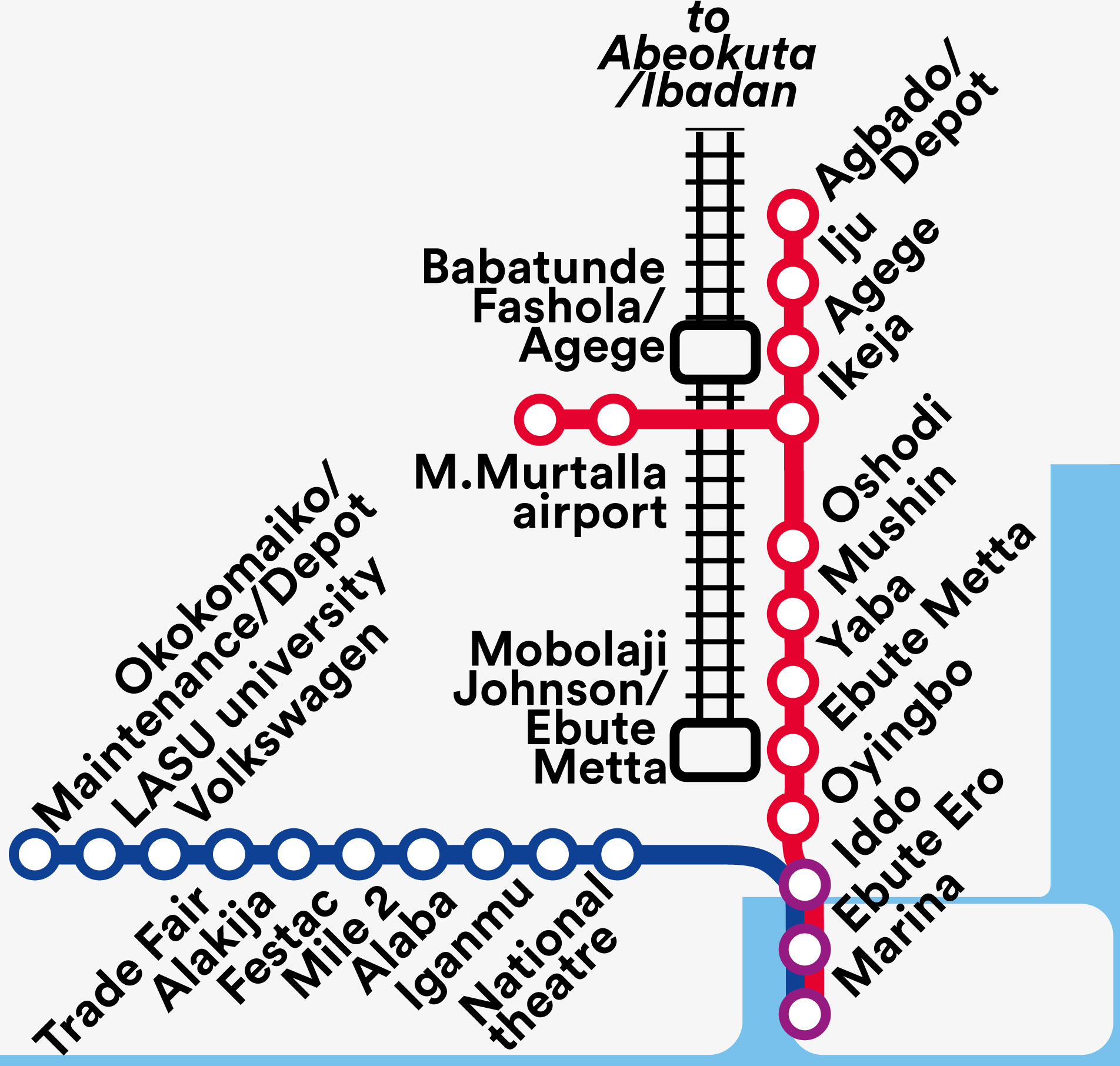
Lagos lightrail

Rail transport in Nigeria

- Lagos Rail Mass Transit

== See also ==
- Transport in Nigeria
- Railway stations in Nigeria
- Jaekel image collection, 1926-c.1970s - This collection consists of various photographs, prints and posters of locomotives and plans relating to the Nigerian Railway Corporation.
