= Lagos–Kano Standard Gauge Railway =

Railway line in Nigeria

Overview
- Status: Lagos–Ibadan (Operational); Warri–Itakpe (Operational); Abuja–Kaduna (Operational); Other segments (In planning)

Service
- Daily ridership: 3,700 (Abuja–Kaduna, 2019)

History
- Opened: 26 July 2016 (Abuja-Kaduna) 29 September 2020 (Warri-Itakpe) 10 June 2021 (Lagos-Ibadan)

Technical
- Line length: 1,343 km (835 mi)
- Track gauge: 1,435 mm (4 ft 8 1/2 in) standard gauge
- Operating speed: 150–250 km/h (93–155 mph)

The Lagos–Kano Standard Gauge Railway is a 1,343-kilometre (835-mile)-long standard gauge railway under construction in Nigeria. Once complete, the railway will connect the Atlantic Ocean port city of Lagos to Kano, near the border with Niger, passing through the national capital of Abuja. The railway replaces the Cape gauge Western Line built by the British in 1896–1927, which has a lower design capacity and is in a deteriorated condition.

Two segments of the railway have been completed and begun passenger trains. The segment between Abuja and Kaduna officially opened in July 2016. The segment between Lagos and Ibadan was flagged off in June 2021.

== Construction ==
After Nigeria became independent from Great Britain, the colonial-era railways progressively fell into a state of disrepair. Passenger traffic on the Nigerian railways fell from 11 million in 1964 to 1.6 million in 2003. Freight traffic almost collapsed, falling from 3 million tonnes in 1964 to less than 100,000 tonnes in 2000. In early 2013, it took 31 hours for passenger trains to travel between Lagos and Kano, at an average speed of just 45 km/h.

Although projects have begun to rehabilitate the Cape gauge railways, economic growth in Nigeria has made a standard gauge line desirable. In 2006, the Nigerian government awarded a $8.3 billion contract to the China Civil Engineering Construction Corporation to construct a standard gauge railway from Lagos to Kano. Due to an inability to secure funding for the whole project, the Nigerian government decided to build the standard gauge line in segments and rehabilitate the narrow-gauge line in the meantime.

=== Abuja–Kaduna ===
The 187 km segment from Abuja to Kaduna was the first to be built. Abuja was not on the national railway network, as it was purpose-built as a capital city after Nigeria became independent from Great Britain. Kaduna is an important junction point on the existing Cape gauge railway network, where a branch line departs the Lagos–Nguru line for Kafanchan, on the Port Harcourt–Maiduguri Railway. The construction of the Abuja–Kaduna segment cost $876 million, consisting of $500 million in loans from the Exim Bank of China and the balance coming from the Nigerian government.

The China Civil Engineering Construction Corporation (CCECC) began construction of the railway on 20 February 2011, and it began laying track in 2013. However, various difficulties delayed the completion of the route. Railway supplies were being stolen by miscreants, forcing CCECC to build a corridor fence to secure the tracks. The decline in the value of the Nigerian naira led to a shortfall in government funding for the project. Delays arose in the acquisition of land required for the railway through compulsory purchase. Although CCECC had marked the Daughters of Charity hospital in Abuja for demolition in 2014, the government did not pay compensation to the hospital until April 2016. The railway was officially inaugurated on 26 July 2016.

=== Warri–Itapke ===
In 1987, the Nigerian government awarded a contract to build the country's first standard gauge railway, linking the mines at Itakpe to the Ajaokuta Steel Mill and onwards to the port city of Warri. However, the project stagnated and was still not finished when the Abuja–Kaduna line opened. CCECC took over construction on the line and, on 29 September 2020, it was officially inaugurated by President Muhammadu Buhari in a virtual ceremony. In October 2019, the government signed a $3.9 billion contract with the China Railway Construction Corporation Limited to extend the railway from Warri to Abuja, connecting it to the Lagos–Kanos Standard Gauge Railway. On 29 September 2020, the Warri–Itakpe Railway was officially inaugurated by President Muhammadu Buhari in a virtual ceremony. Passenger trains began running in October 2020, and freight service began in April 2021.

=== Lagos–Ibadan ===
A $1.53 billion contract was awarded in 2012 to the China Civil Engineering Construction Corporation for construction of the Lagos–Ibadan segment (156 km) of the standard gauge railway by 2016. However, the project has also faced delays. A ground-breaking ceremony finally took place on 7 March 2017, and the railway was scheduled for completion in December 2018. Construction was delayed by heavy rains in Spring 2018, and the Nigerian government had to deploy soldiers to protect the railway workers from hoodlums and armed robbers. Construction was further delayed by the 2019 Nigerian general election, when CCECC evacuated its Chinese employees as a precaution. Progress was slowed in 2020 by the social distancing needed to fight the COVID-19 pandemic, as only 20 workers were present on construction sites that once held 200. Passenger trains began trial operations on 7 December 2020. Nobel laureate Wole Soyinka became a frequent passenger on the train, calling it "a very impressive work in progress considering the difficulty of really executing anything in this country." The railway was officially inaugurated by President Muhammadu Buhari on 10 June 2021.

=== Other segments ===
On 15 May 2018, the Nigerian Minister of Transportation signed a $6.68 billion contract with the China Civil Engineering Construction Corporation to complete the remaining segments of the Lagos–Kano Standard Gauge Railway. Construction is expected to take 2–3 years from the availability of funds. In January 2015, the China Development Bank announced that it was proving a $254.76 million loan for the construction of the Kaduna-Kano segment of the line.

- Ibadan-Osogbo-Ilorin (200 km)
- Osogbo–Ado Ekiti
- Ilorin-Minna (270 km)
- Minna–Abuja
- Kaduna-Kano (305 km)

== Operation ==
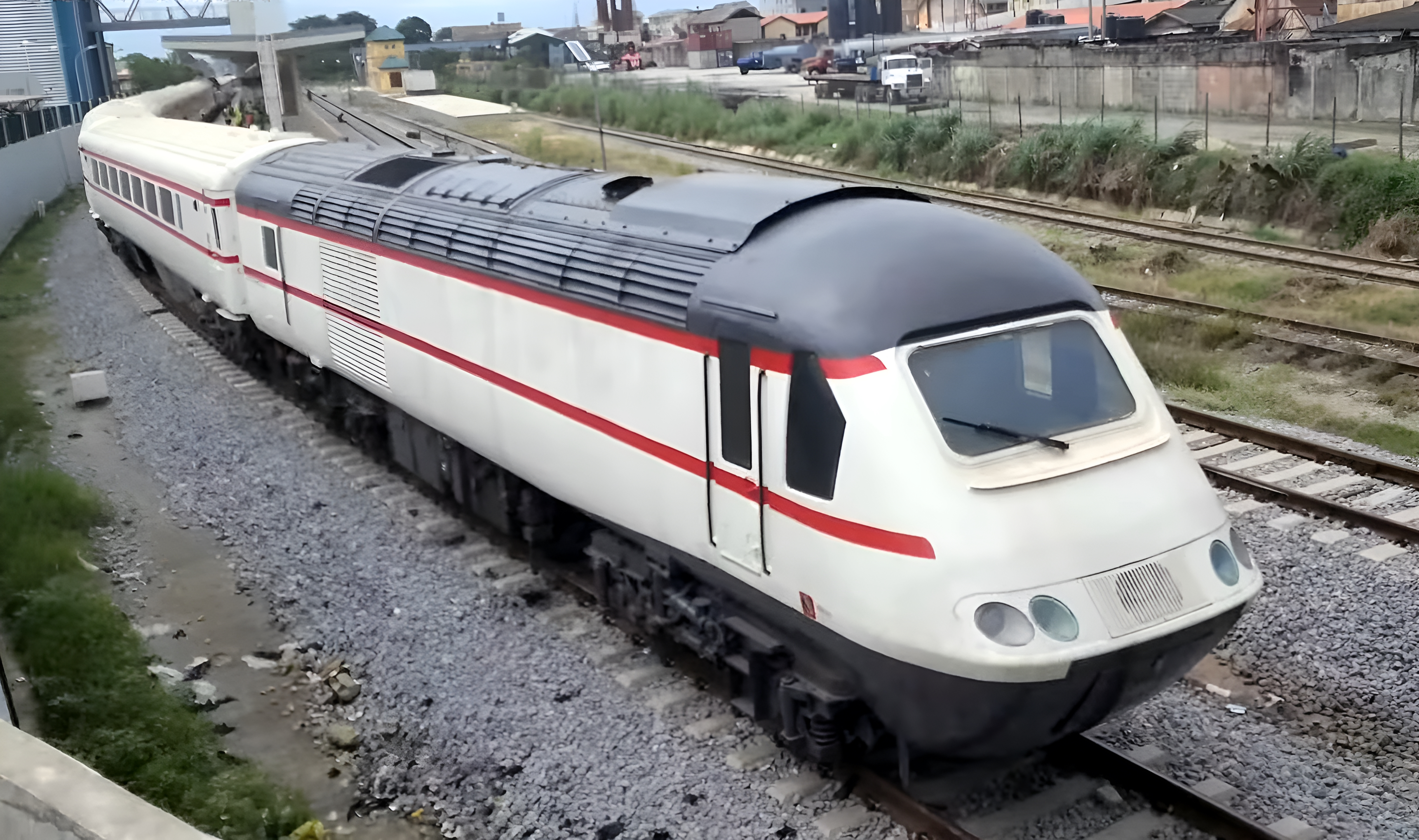
British Rail Class 43 powercar

The completion of the Abuja–Kaduna line in 2016 came at a critical time for ground transport in the region. Starting in 2009, the Abuja–Kaduna Expressway fell into a state of lawlessness as it was besieged by armed robbers and kidnappers. Many of the victims were prominent government officials, including Sierra Leone's High Commissioner to Nigeria. Fearing for their safety, travelers flocked to the train. Daily patronage increased 270% to 3,700, and railway officials were accused of and arrested for ticket racketeering. Senator Mohammed Ali Ndume reported that he had to stand on the train for the whole trip, and Senator James Manager said, "It is one who wants to commit suicide that will take the road."

Eleven British Rail Class 43 powercars and 11 British Rail Mark 3 carriages last operated by Arriva CrossCountry and First Great Western were purchased from Angel Trains in 2023.

== Accidents and incidents ==
On 28 March 2022, a passenger train on the Abuja-Kaduna line was attacked by bandits. At least eight people were killed and 65 were kidnapped.

== See also ==
- Rail transport in Nigeria
- Railway stations in Nigeria
- Warri–Itakpe Railway
