= Mining industry of Nigeria =

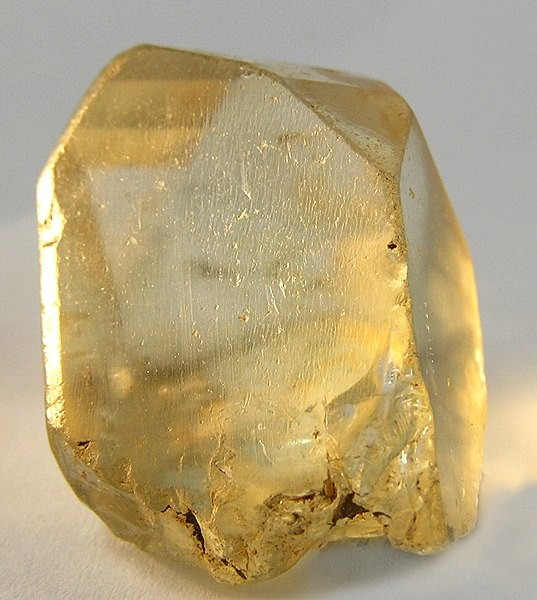
Topaz from the Jos Plateau in Plateau State

The mining of minerals in Nigeria accounts for only 0.3% of its gross domestic product, due to the influence of its vast oil resources. The domestic mining industry is underdeveloped, leading to Nigeria having to import minerals that it could produce domestically, such as salt or iron ore. The rights to ownership of mineral resources is held by the Federal Government of Nigeria, which grants titles to organizations to explore, mine, and sell mineral resources. Organized mining began in 1903, when the Mineral Survey of the Northern Protectorates was created by the British colonial government. A year later, the Mineral Survey of the Southern Protectorates was founded. By the 1940s, Nigeria was a major producer of tin, columbite, and coal. The discovery of oil in 1956 hurt the mineral extraction industries, as government and industry both began to focus on this new resource. The Nigerian Civil War in the late 1960s led many expatriate mining experts to leave the country. Mining regulation is handled by the Ministry of Solid Minerals Development, who are tasked with the responsibility of overseeing the management of all mineral resources in Nigeria. Mining law is codified in the Federal Minerals and Mining Act of 1999. Historically, Nigeria's mining industry was monopolized by state-owned public corporations. Lack of government investment in mining education, and government corruption led to a decline in productivity in almost all mineral industries. The Obasanjo administration began a process of selling off government-owned corporations to private investors in 1999. The Nigerian Mining Industry has picked up since the "Economic Diversification Agenda", from Oil & Gas, to Agriculture, Mining, etc., began in the country.

== Coal, lignite and coke ==
Mining is the extraction or removal of minerals and metals from the earth. The Nigerian Coal Corporation is a parastatal corporation that was formed in 1950 and held a monopoly on the mining, processing, and sales of coal, lignite, and coke products until 1999.

Coal was first discovered in Enugu in 1909 at the Udi Ridge in Enugu. It was found by Albert Kitson, a British mine engineer. Coal geology is a mixture of sedimentary rock and ancient vegetation that has been changed by heat and microbial activity over a considerable period of time. The Ogbete Mine had opened and begun regularly extracting coal by 1916. By 1920, coal production had reached 180,122 long tons (183,012 t). Nigeria coal was established in 1950, and by 1960 production was at 565,681 long tons (574,758 t). The Nigerian Civil War caused many mines to be abandoned. After the war ended in the early 1970s, coal production was never able to recover. Attempts to mechanize the industry in the 1970s and 1980s were ultimately unsuccessful, and actually hindered production due to problems with implementation and maintenance. The main purpose for the use of coal in Nigeria is for the operation of railway system. Coal was converted to diesel after Nigeria civil war and the coal mining industry was abandoned.

The Nigerian government is currently trying to privatize the Nigerian Coal Corporation and sell off its assets. While the domestic market for coal has been negatively affected by the move to diesel and gas-powered engines by organizations that were previously major coal consumers, the low-sulfur coal mined in Nigeria is desirable by international customers in Italy and the United Kingdom, who have imported Nigerian coal. Recent financial problems have caused a near shutdown of the Nigerian Coal Corporation mining operations, and the corporation has responded by attempting to sell off some of its assets while it waits for the government to complete privatization activities.

In April 2008, Minister of Mines and Steel Sarafa Tunji Ishola announced that Nigeria was considering coal as an alternative power source as it attempted to reform its power sector, and encouraged Chinese investors to invest in the coal industry.

The Nigerian Mining Cadastre Office manages all the Nigerian mining licenses and mining rights. They are a subsidiary of the Ministry of Mines and Steel Development of the Federal Republic of Nigeria.

== Gold ==
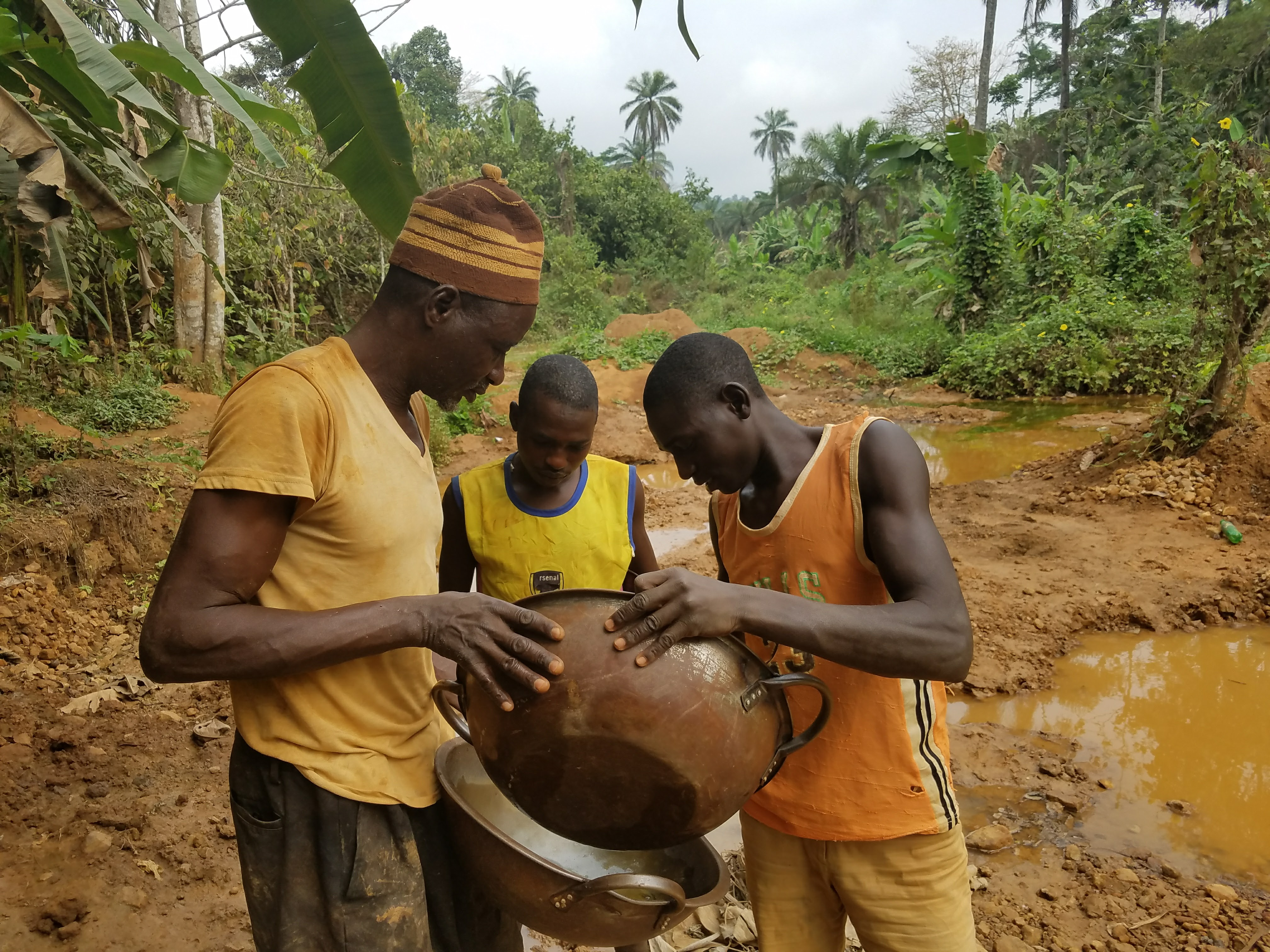
Illegal miners in Itagun, Osun State, gathering their gold finds in the pan

Gold deposits are found in Northern Nigeria, most prominently near Maru, Anka, Malele, Tsohon Birnin Gwari-Kwaga, Gurmana, Bin Yauri, Okolom-Dogondaji, and Iperindo in Osun state.

Gold production began in 1913 and peaked in the 1930s. During the Second World War, production declined. Mines were abandoned by colonial companies, and production never recovered.

The Nigerian Mining Corporation (NMC) was formed in the early 1980s to explore gold. Lack of funding and the lure of easier profits from oil production led to its failure. In recent times, there has been some development in gold exploration in Osun State in South Western Nigeria. Small-scale mining activities carried out by artisanal miners are still prevalent.

The family of Allie from Anka is one of the leading gold families in the region.

== Lithium ==
In 2019 lithium was discovered in Nigeria. The metal is highly in demand for batteries. Nigeria's minister of mines and steel development, Olamilekan Adegbite, rejected an offer by Elon Musk to mine lithium in Nigeria in 2022.

== Columbite, wolframite, and tantalite ==
Columbite and tantalite are ores used to produce the elements niobium and tantalum. Columbite and tantalite are collectively known as coltan in Africa. Tantalum is a valuable rare element used in electronics manufacturing. In Nigeria, pegmatite deposits of coltan are frequently also the source of several precious and semi-precious stones such as beryl, aquamarine, and tourmaline. These pegmatites are found in Nassarawa State near the Jos Plateau, as well as in several areas in southeast Nigeria. There is small-scale mining of these minerals. Wolframite (tungsten) can be found in the North states.

== Bitumen ==
Bitumen was first discovered in 1900, with focused exploration beginning in 1905.The estimated probable reserves of bitumen in Ondo State, Lagos State, Edo State And Ogun State that is the Southwest region of Nigeria is 16 billion barrels, while that of tar sands and heavy oil is estimated at 42 billion barrels, almost as twice the amount of existing reserves of crude petroleum.

== Iron ore ==
Nigeria has several deposits of iron ore, but the purest deposits are in and around Itakpe in Kogi State.

The National Iron Ore Mining Company was founded in 1979 and given the mission to explore, exploit, process, and supply iron ore concentrate to the Ajaokuta Steel Company (ASCL) in Ajaokuta and Delta Steel Company (DCL) in Aladja. Additional demand has come from several steel rolling mills. The company and its mining operations are based in Kogi State. Export of excess iron ore beyond what is required for domestic needs is currently being explored. Additionally, the Nigerian government has invested in foreign iron ore operations in Guinea.

== Uranium ==
The Nigeria Uranium Mining Company (NUMCO) was a parastatal organization that controlled the exploration and mining of uranium in Nigeria and was a public/private partnership with Total Compagnie Minière of France, which owned 40% of the company. In 1989, Total pulled out of the partnership, and in 1993 the government reassigned NUMCO's responsibilities to the Nigerian Geological Survey. The NUMCO corporation was dissolved in 1996. The mechanization of the coal corporation was not successful, this was because the military Government officials did not employ people with the right technical skill set. This was the pattern coal corporation was managed. There was also a plan of the Federal government to privatize the coal corporation but it also failed.

As at 2008, the government was in the process of liquidating its remaining assets.

Recently, several important uranium deposits have been discovered in Cross River State, Adamawa State, Taraba State, Plateau State, Bauchi State, and Kano State by the British Geological Survey.

== Gemstones ==
Gemstones mining has occurred in various parts of Plateau, Kaduna and Bauchi states, including for sapphire, ruby, aquamarine, emerald, tourmaline, topaz, garnet, amethyst, zircon, and fluorspar.

== Artisanal Small-Scale Mining (ASGM) ==
In Nigeria, artisanal and small-scale gold mining (ASGM) entails unorganized, labor-intensive gold mining operations with no access to money. Ten or more unskilled workers use crude tools and methods to extract tiny gold deposits with poor production levels. Small-scale gold mining can be manual, semi-mechanized, or mechanized, in contrast to artisanal gold mining, which is entirely manual.

ASGM involves artisans and investors trading commodities such as diamonds, gold, and agricultural products. These activities are conducted on a large scale and form of regular commercial transactions.

ASGM is also defined as small-scale mining activities that collect and refine metals and minerals from secondary and primary ores using primitive or crude techniques. All small, medium, informal, legal, and illegal miners are included.

== Ecological effects ==
Environmental officials with the government of Plateau State believe that 1,100 tin and columbite mines, abandoned after the mining boom of the 1960s, now pose serious health risks to as many as 2 million people living in the area. Radioactive mine tailings were reported to be a danger to local people living around mining fields in Jos, Barikin-Ladi, Bukur, Bassa and Riyom districts.
