= Ajaokuta Steel Mill =

Steal milling company in Nigeria

Coordinates: 7.510°N 6.689°E

Ajaokuta Steel Mill Company
- Type: State-owned enterprise
- Industry: Steel
- Founded: 1979
- Fate: In minimal operation
- Area served: Nigeria
- Website: www.ajaokutasteel.com

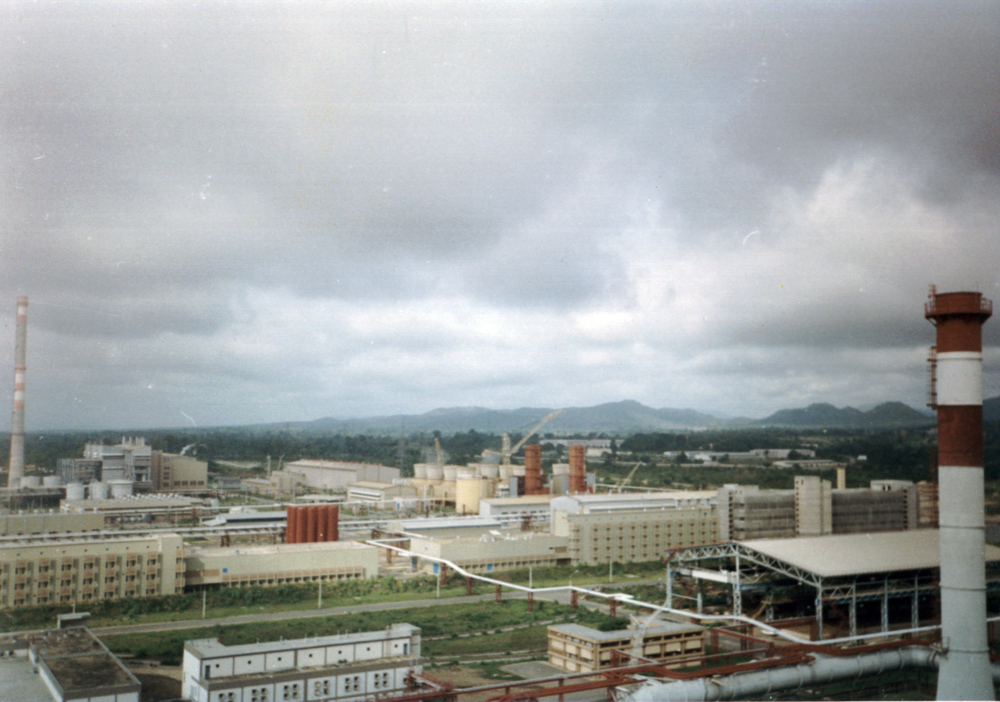
Ajaokuta Steel Mill

Ajaokuta Steel Company Limited (ASCL) popularly known as Ajaokuta Steel Mill is a steel mill in Nigeria, located in Ajaokuta, Kogi State, Nigeria. Built on a 24,000-hectare (59,000-acre) site starting in 1979, it is the largest steel mill in Nigeria, and the coke oven and by-products plant are larger than all the refineries in Nigeria combined. However, the project was mismanaged and remains incomplete more than 45 years later. Three-quarters of the complex have been abandoned, and only the light mills have been put into operation for small-scale fabrication and the production of iron rods. In 2024, the Nigerian government began trying to engage Chinese partners for a revitalization of the mill.

== History ==
A feasibility study for the production of steel was first awarded to the British and later undertaken by the Soviet Union under a cooperation agreement with Nigeria. By 1967, Soviet experts recommended prospecting for better quality iron ore. The National Steel Development Authority (NSDA) was established in 1971, which led to the discovery of commercial iron ore in Itakpe, Ajabanoko, and Oshokoshoko in 1973 and the planning of the Ajaokuta plant.

=== Shehu Shagari Administration, 1979–1983 ===
In 1979, the government of President Shehu Shagari created by decree Ajaokuta Steel Company, Delta Steel Company, and three rolling mills at Oshogbo, Jos, and Katsina.

Construction of the Ajaokuta steel complex also commenced in 1979 under Shagari and reached 84% completion by the time of his removal from office in the 1983 coup d'état.

=== Military Governments, 1983–1993, 1993–1999 ===
To supply the Ajaokuta Steel Mill with raw materials and connect it with the world market, a contract was awarded in 1987 to construction company Julius Berger for the construction of Nigeria's first standard gauge railway, from the iron mines at Itakpe to the steel mill at Ajaokuta. An extension continuing to the Atlantic Ocean at Warri was later added. However, like the steel mill, the railway project was mismanaged.

The steel mill reached 98% completion in 1994, with 40 of the 43 plants at the facility having been built.

=== Olusegun Obasanjo Administration, 1999–2007 ===
In 2002, the Nigerian government under Olusegun Obasanjo concessioned the project to Japanese Kobe Steel in an attempt at revitalization, however without much success. In 2004, the project was again transferred, this time to Ispat Steel. The deal was financed by Global Infrastructure Holdings Limited (GIHL), which is chaired by Indian steel magnate Pramod Mittal.

=== Umaru Musa Yar'Adua Administration, 2007–2010 ===
The Umaru Musa Yar'Adua administration terminated the GIHL concession in 2008 after the government accused GIHL of asset-stripping.

=== Goodluck Jonathan Administration, 2010–2015 ===
Under President Goodluck Jonathan, the government took steps to regain control of the Ajaokuta Steel complex from GIHL. Following failed concession discussions, it proposed a plan and approved $650 million in attempts to resuscitate the project. GIHL then sued Nigeria at International Chamber of Commerce.

=== Muhammadu Buhari Administration, 2015–2023 ===
The dispute was resolved in 2016 under President Muhammadu Buhari, with Nigeria regaining control of the Ajaokuta Steel Mill in exchange for GIHL retaining the Nigerian Iron Ore Mining Company (NIOMCO) operating at Itakpe. In 2022, the Nigerian government paid $496 million to GIHL to settle the claims.

The Ajaokuta Steel Mill still had not produced a single sheet of steel by December 2017. The light mills were finally put into operation in 2018 for small-scale fabrication and the production of iron rods. However, three-quarters of the plant have been abandoned, including the large-scale equipment and the internal railway.

In 2019, at the Russia-Africa Summit in Sochi, Buhari and his Russian counterpart Vladimir Putin agreed on a revitalization of the steel mill with Russian support. A taskforce within the Nigerian government was set up with a view to revamping the project with funding from the Afreximbank and the Russian Export Center. However, the COVID pandemic delayed and ultimately thwarted these plans.

=== Bola Tinubu Administration, 2023–present ===
In January 2024, the Nigerian government announced that it had commenced discussions with Chinese steel company Luan Steel Holding Group with the aim of reviving the Nigerian steel industry, including the production of military hardware at Ajaokuta Steel Mill. By June 2025, the government had also engaged in talks with Chinese firms Fangda Steel, Jingye Group and Baowu subsidiary Sinosteel.

== Railway ==
In 1987, a contract was awarded to construction company Julius Berger for the construction of Nigeria's first standard gauge railway, from the iron mines at Itakpe to the steel mill at Ajaokuta, and later continuing to the Atlantic Ocean at Warri. Although the railway was completed from Itakpe to Ajaokuta, progress was slow on the extension to Warri. Only 254 km of the 276 km extension to Warri had been completed by 2009, when the Nigerian government awarded a ₦33 billion contract to Julius Berger and TEAM Nigeria to complete the remaining stretch by 2013.

In 2016, the Nigerian government awarded contracts to the China Civil Engineering Construction Corporation and Julius Berger to repair and complete the railway. Test runs began in November 2018, and the railway was officially inaugurated by President Muhammadu Buhari on 29 September 2020 as a mixed freight and passenger line.

Construction is underway on an extension to Abuja, where it will connect to the Lagos–Kano Standard Gauge Railway.

== Criticism ==
Like the Nigerian government-owned oil refineries, the uncompleted steel mill has been a colossal money pit. The idle plant continues to cost roughly ₦6.69 billion annually in salaries, despite generating zero output. While other greenfield integrated steel mill projects are reported to cost $1 billion to $4 billion in 2026, the Ajaokuta project has cost an estimated $8 billion to $10 billion in public funds between 1979 and 1994.

According to Nigerian financial planner and economic strategy consultant Kalu Aja, a series of policy failures has prevented the Ajaokuta Steel Mill from being completed and put into operation 40 years after its construction first began. Aja contends that three major requirements must be satisfied before the mill can produce steel: 1) the Nigerian Iron Ore Mining Company (NIOMCO) operating at Itakpe must be operational, since Nigerian iron must first be processed before being suitable for steel production; 2) the Itakpe to Ajaokuta railway line must be functional to ensure continued supply; and 3) the blast furnace must be operational. Blast furnaces operate continuously for years at a time without being shut down and thus require a steady supply. Aja concludes, that since none of the three requirements are met, the furnace at Ajaokuta has never been turned on because Ajaokuta has never had raw materials available to ensure continuous production.
