= Itakpe =

Coordinates: 07°36′52″N 06°19′7″E

Itakpe is a town in Kogi State, Nigeria. The Itakpe Hills in and around the town of Itakpe contain very pure deposits of iron ore. The National Iron Ore Mining Company is located here. It supplies the steel works of Ajaokuta and Aladja, as well as producing ore for export.

== School ==
Due to the growing staff strength and subsequent creation of workers settlements (CAMP I AND CAMP II), the need for standard schools arose. The women association of NIOMP staff established a day children's care. The pre-nursery school was established to help nursing mothers cater for their children while they were at work and to lay a solid educational foundation for them.

The management of the then National Iron Ore Mining Project (NIOMP) then established a primary school, NIOMP Staff Nursery and Primary School (NSNPS) to meet the growing educational demands of the young mining community.

Years later, the Management established a secondary school, initially called NIOMP Comprehensive High School. The name would later be changed to NIOMCO Staff Secondary School (NSSS) after the company was renamed National Iron Ore Mining Company.

Although the schools were intended for the children of company staff, children of non-staff from the neighboring community were later admitted after serious pressure from their parents was applied. The schools' academic prowess grew to legendary status, and children from towns dozens of kilometres away were admitted to became students.

== Colonies ==
When the Iron Ore Project was inaugurated by Gen. Babangida, foreign expatriates were called in to manage the project and train the Nigerian staff.

The expatriates were naturally secluded and had their living quarters. The living quarters were further divided into colonies.

Altogether, there are six colonies, viz: Koch Clemency Sofremines Special Guest House Camp I Camp II

Koch, Clemency, and Sofremines were colonies for German, British, and French expatriates respectively. The colonies were designed to modern standards and feature sports clubs, a bakery, small parks, fruit orchids, spacious houses, and a few swimming pools.

The special guest house was a magnificent lodge for hosting VIPs like Heads of State or their representatives, Mynisters, and other VIPs.

The Nigerian staff were given living quarters in Camp I and Camp II. The houses are of different styles with modern flats the most common.

== Lifestyle ==
Most of the Nigerians wear traditional dresses. Main food crops are Yam, Cassava and Corn. Traders bring most of the vegetables from the city of Jose. People mostly use cow milk for their dairy products. Traders from various cities sell precious stones, wooden handicraft, leather items etc. for reasonable prices.

== Transport ==
Itakpe is the inland terminus of the Itakpe–Warri Railway, a standard gauge railway that passes by the Ajaokuta Steel Mill on its way to the Atlantic Ocean port of Warri. There are plans to extend the line from Itakpe to Abuja, where it will connect to the standard gauge network that is under connection.

== See also ==
- Railway stations in Nigeria
- Iron ore in Africa
