= Ifaw =

Town in Nigeria

Coordinates: 06°49′00″N 03°12′00″E

Ifo is a town in south-western Nigeria near Lagos.

== Transport ==
It is served by a junction station on the national railway network.

== See also ==
- Railway stations in Nigeria
