= Fangda Steel =

Chinese iron and steel company

Fangda Group Co., Ltd.
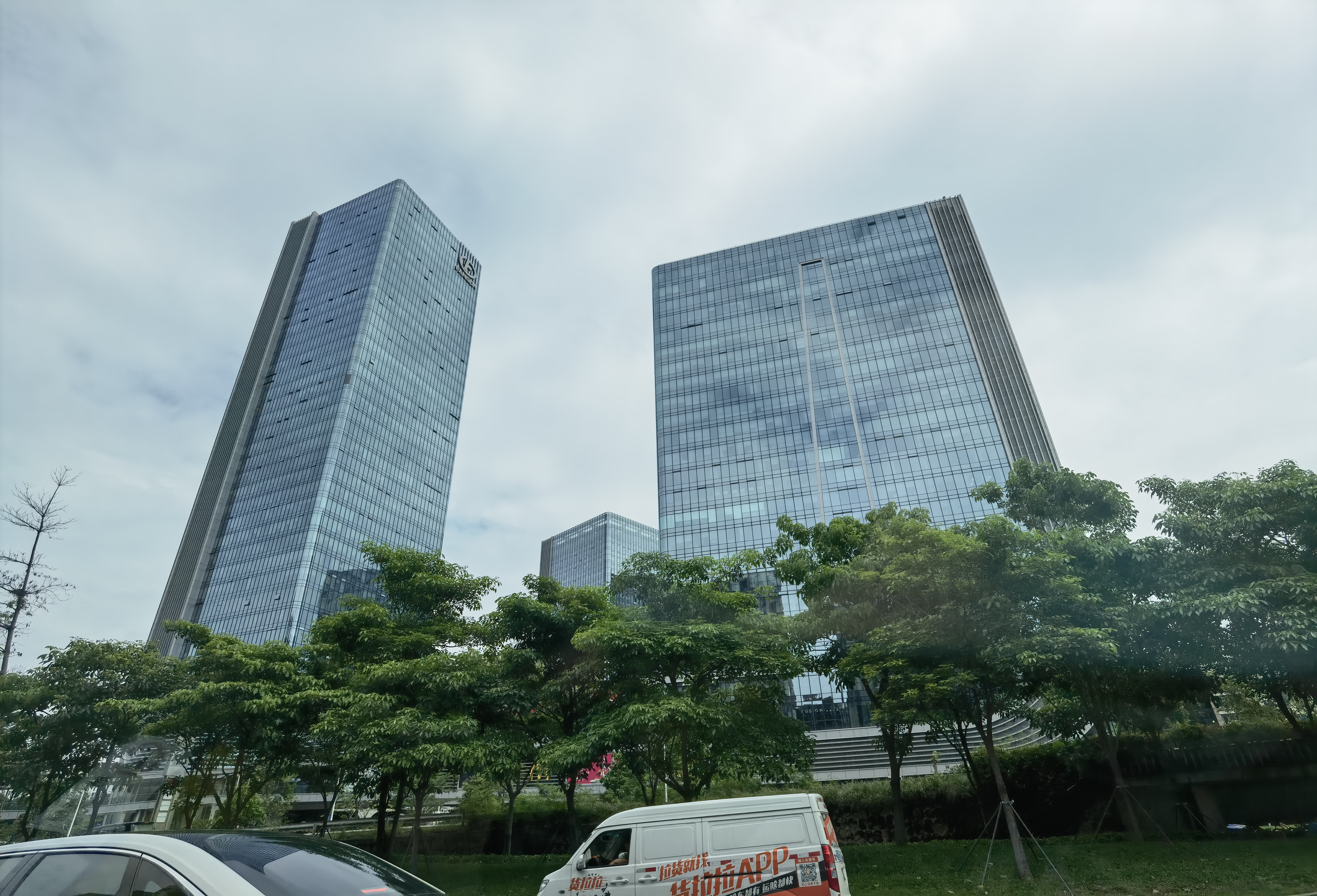
- Type: State-owned enterprise
- Industry: Steel
- Predecessor: Shenzhen Fangda Industrial Co., Ltd. Shenzhen Fangda Building Materials Co., Ltd.
- Founded: December 13, 1995
- Headquarters: Shenzhen, China
- Key people: Xiong Jianming (Chairman and CEO)
- Products: Steel, flat steel products, long steel products, wire products, plates
- Operating income: RMB 21.17 million (2018)
- Net income: RMB 2.246 billion (2018)
- Total assets: RMB 10.659 billion (2018)
- Owner: Chinese Central Government (100%)
- Parent: SASAC of the State Council
- Subsidiaries: Shenzhen Fangda Construction Technology Group Co., Ltd. Fangda Zhichuang Technology Co., Ltd. Fangda New Materials (Jiangxi) Co., Ltd. Shenzhen Fangda New Energy Co., Ltd. Shenzhen Fangda Real Estate Development Co., Ltd.
- Website: www.fangda.com

Fangda Group Co., Ltd. (SZSE: 000055/200055) is a Chinese Shenzhen Stock Exchange listed company established on December 13, 1995. Its business scope includes: production and operation of new building materials, composite materials, metal products, metal structures, environmental protection equipment and instruments, public safety and prevention equipment, metallurgical equipment, optomechanical and electrical integration products, polymer engineering and products, fine chemical products, mechanical equipment, optoelectronic materials and instruments, optoelectronic equipment, electronic display equipment, audio-visual equipment, transportation facilities, various HVAC equipment and products, water supply and drainage equipment, central air-conditioning equipment and its spare parts, semiconductor materials and devices, integrated circuits, light source products and equipment, solar energy products and the design, technical development, installation, construction, related technical consultation and training of the above products, property management, property leasing, and parking lot operation. The company's total share capital is 756.9099 million shares (2011).

The company is headquartered in Fangdacheng Science and Technology Building, Longjing, Xili, Nanshan District, Shenzhen City, in the People's Republic of China. The legal representative is Xiong Jianming, a representative of the National People's Congress.
