= Itakpe mine =

Iron ore mine in Kogi State, Nigeria

- Location within Nigeria
- Location: Kogi State, Nigeria; 7.61848°N 6.317862°E
- Products: Iron ore
- Opened: 2012

The Itakpe mine is a large iron mine located in central Nigeria in the Kogi State. Itakpe represents one of the largest iron ore reserves in Nigeria and in the world having estimated reserves of 3 billion tonnes of ore grading 32% iron metal.
