= China Civil Engineering Construction Corporation =

Chinese construction company

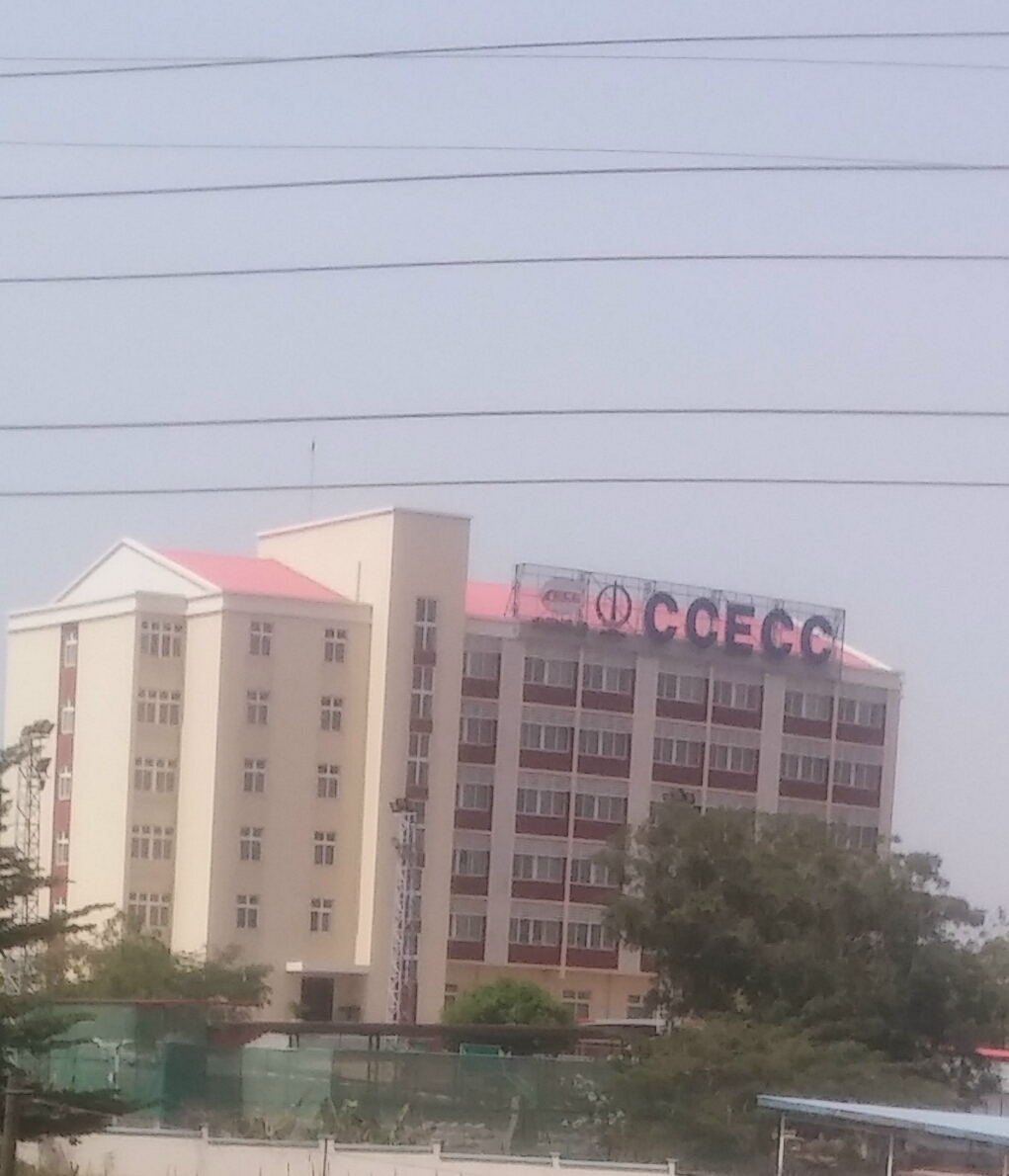
- Founded: June 1979; 47 years ago
- Headquarters: Beijing, China
- Area served: Worldwide
- Parent: China Railway Construction Corporation Limited (100%)
- Website: www.ccecc.com.cn

China Civil Engineering Construction Corporation
- Simplified Chinese: 中国土木工程集团有限公司
- Traditional Chinese: 中國土木工程集團有限公司
- Literal meaning: China Civil Engineering Construction Group Limited [Liability] Company
Transcriptions
Standard Mandarin
- Hanyu Pinyin: Zhōngguó tǔmù gōngchéng jítuán yǒuxiàn gōngsī
Hakka
- Romanization: Chûng-koet thú muk kûng chhàng si̍p thòn yû han kûng-sṳ̂
Yue: Cantonese
- Yale Romanization: Zùnggwók tōumùhk gùngcing zàahptyun jáuhhàahn gùngsì
- Jyutping: Zung1-gwok3 tou2-muk6 gung1-cing4 zaap6-tyun4 jau5-haan6 gung1-si1
Southern Min
- Hokkien POJ: Tiong-kok thô͘ bo̍k kang têng chi̍p thôan ū hān kong si

China Civil Engineering Construction Corporation Ltd. (abbreviation CCECC) was established in June 1979 under the approval of the State Council of the People's Republic of China. CCECC developed from the earlier Foreign Aid Department of the Ministry of Railways, building on its experience in executing the biggest foreign-aid project of China, the TAZARA Railway. It is now a large-scale state-owned enterprise undertaking international project contracting and economic cooperation functions.

Its range of business extends from international contracting for railway construction to other forms of civil engineering design and consultancy, real estate development, trading, industrial investment and hotel management. The business activities of CCECC have expanded to over 40 countries and regions where more than 20 overseas offices or subsidiaries have been established. With its excellent performance and high quality in services, CCECC has been listed among the world's top 255 international contractors for many years and ranked consecutively among the first 70 in recent years by the Engineering News Record "ENR".

== History ==
- From 1970 to 1975, the foreign aid department of the Ministry of Railways helped build the TAZARA Railway in Tanzania and Zambia. The 1,860 km railway in Africa was China's single largest foreign aid project.
- On 1 June 1979 China Civil Engineering Construction Corporation was incorporated, upon the approval by the State Council of China.
- After approval by the State Economic and Trade Commission and the Ministry of Railways, China Civil Engineering Construction Corporation was reformed into Group on December 26, 1996, With the China Civil Engineering Construction Corporation as the core enterprise, and simultaneously changed its name into Group (hereinafter called CCECC).
- CCECC completed its disconnection with the Ministry of Railway in September 2000, and meanwhile was attached to the Industry Commission of Central Enterprise of the China Communist Party Central Committee.
- At the beginning of 2003, CCECC was, along with other 195 central enterprise, under the direct leadership of the State-owned Assets Supervision and Administration Commission of the State Council.
- CCECC underwent strategic reform with the China Railway Construction Corporation in the form of a merger in September 2003 based on the spirit of the document "The Written Replay on the reform of the China Railway Construction Corporation and the China Civil Engineering Construction Corporation (document No.: SA Reform [2003] No. 153)" issued by the State-owned Assets Supervision and Administration Commission of the State Council.
- CCECC, at present, is the member of the China Chamber of International Commerce, the Vice Chairmen level unit of the China International Contractors Association and the Director of the China International Engineering Consulting Association.

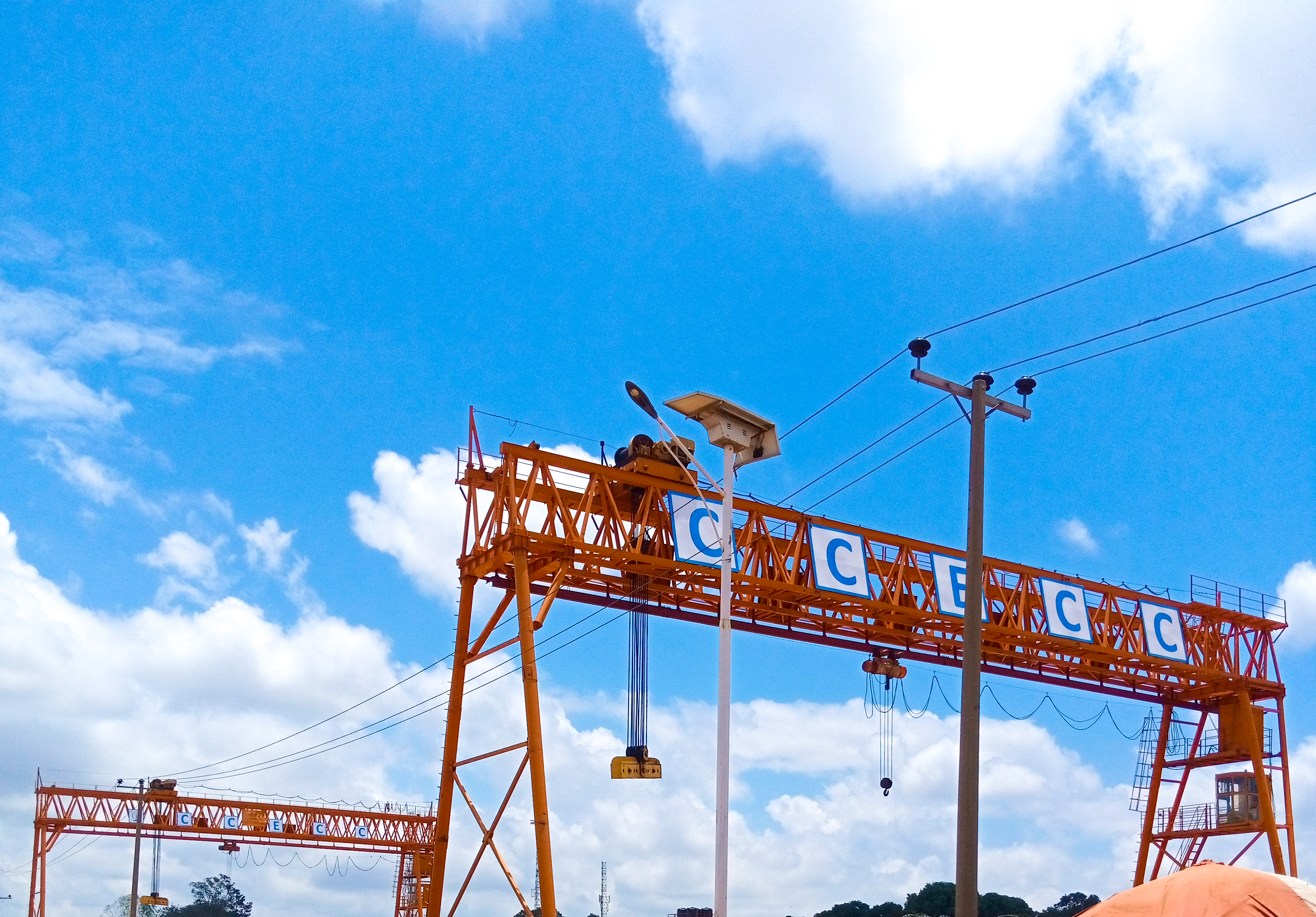
CCECC Construction site in Kaduna State, Nigeria, in August 2021, building the Rabah Road bridge.

== Projects ==
Successfully completed projects and contract awards include:

- In 2000, a joint venture company involving the CCECC and Hyundai won a contract to undertake dredging and construction work for Container Terminal 9 at Kwai Chung, Hong Kong.
- In 2009, CCECC completed both bores of the 8.6 km Tunnels.
- In 2014, CCECC is building a double track standard gauge railway from Lagos to Kano, in Nigeria.
- In 2014, CCECC completed both bores of the 4.6 km tunnel on the 23 km line under construction.
- In 2014, CCECC won a contract to build underground station of Light Rail.
- In 2015, CCECC won a contract to build underground stations and to bore tunnels of eastern part of Light Rail.
- In 2019, CCECC won a contract to build a regional train line to connect Bogota to its neighbouring suburbs, known as RegioTram.
