= Kanye (disambiguation) =

Kanye West (born 1977) is an American rapper, record producer, and fashion designer.

Kanye may also refer to:

- Kanye (name), a list of people with the name
- Kanye, Botswana, a village in Botswana
  - Kanye Airport, an airport serving the village
  - Kanye West (Botswana constituency), a constituency in the village
    - Kanye South, a former constituency in the village, replaced by Kanye West
  - Kanye East, another constituency in the village
- "Kanye", a 2014 song by the Chainsmokers featuring SirenXX

== See also ==
- Kanye West (disambiguation)
- Kayne
