= Letsholo =

Letsholo is a surname. Notable people with the surname include:

- Thapelo Letsholo (cricketer) (born 1992), South African cricketer
- Thapelo Letsholo (politician), Motswana politician and entrepreneur
