= Thapelo Letsholo =

Thapelo Letsholo is the name of:

- Thapelo Letsholo (cricketer) (born 1992), South African cricketer
- Thapelo Letsholo (politician), Botswanan politician
