= Kayne =

Kayne is a given name. Notable people with the name include:

== Given name ==
- Kayne Gillaspie (born 1979), American fashion designer, specializing in beauty pageant gowns
- Kayne Lawton (born 1989), Australian Rugby League player
- Kayne McLaggon (born 1990), Welsh footballer who plays as striker
- Kayne Pettifer (born 1982), Australian rules footballer in Australian Football League
- Kayne Robinson, American president of National Rifle Association
- Kayne Scott (born 1968), New Zealand racing driver
- Kayne Taylor, Australian pop music singer from Melbourne who won 2004 series of Popstars Live
- Kayne Vincent (born 1988), New Zealand football (soccer) player currently playing for Mumbai FC

== Surname ==
- Ana Cruz Kayne (born 1984), American actress
- Michael Cruz Kayne, American comedian
- Richard Kayne (disambiguation), several people
