= Kanye South =

Parliamentary constituency in Botswana

- Former Single-member constituency for the National Assembly
- Boundary of Kanye South in Botswana
- District: Southern
- Population: 40,907
- Major settlements: Kanye
- Area: 1,478 km^{2}

Former constituency
- Created: 1965
- Abolished: 2024
- Created from: Kanye; Ngwaketse South (2004)
- Replaced by: Kanye West
- First abolition: 1984
- Re-established: 2004

Kanye South was a constituency in the Southern District represented in the National Assembly of Botswana. Further to the completion of the 2022 Delimitation of Parliamentary constituencies, the seat was subjected to significant boundary changes and was replaced by Kanye West, first contested at the 2024 general election.

== Constituency profile ==
The seat was traditionally a marginal seat for the Botswana National Front, consistently supporting it from its establishment until the Botswana Democratic Party secured a landslide victory. This aligned with the broader success the BDP achieved in the Southern parts of Botswana during the 2019 election. The constituency, predominantly rural, encompassed the following villages:

1. Selokolela
2. Lefhoko
3. Sesung
4. Seherelela
5. Tsonyane
6. Betesankwe
7. Lotlhakane
8. Kanye

== Members of Parliament ==
Key: BNF UDC BDP

Election	Winner
1965 election	Quett Masire
1969 election	Bathoen II
1974 election	Bathoen II
1979 election	Bathoen II
2004 election	Omphitlhetse Maswabi
2009 election	Abram Kesupile
2014 election	Abram Kesupile
2019 election	Lemogang Kwape

== Election results ==
=== 2019 election ===
General election 2019: Kanye South
Party	Candidate	Votes	%	±%
BDP	Lemogang Kwape	11,194	60.73	+16.38
UDC	Victor Phologolo	6,753	36.64	−10.00
Independent	Abram Kesupile	484	2.63	N/A
Margin of victory		4,441	24.10	N/A
Total valid votes		18,431	99.21	+0.43
Rejected ballots		146	0.79	−0.43
Turnout		18,577	83.73	−1.41
Registered electors		22,188		
BDP gain from UDC		Swing	+13.19	

=== 2014 election ===
General election 2014: Kanye South
Party	Candidate	Votes	%	±%
UDC	Abram Kesupile	7,351	46.64	−3.15
BDP	Lemogang Kwape	6,990	44.35	+0.07
BCP	Aldrine Madigele	1,420	9.01	+3.08
Margin of victory		361	2.3	−3.22
Total valid votes		15,761	98.78	+0.19
Rejected ballots		194	1.22	−0.19
Turnout		15,955	85.14	+7.60
Registered electors		18,740		
UDC hold		Swing	−1.54	

=== 2009 election ===
General election 2009: Kanye South
Party	Candidate	Votes	%	±%
BNF	Abram Kesupile	5,303	49.79	−3.20
BDP	Ashton Sealetsa	4,716	44.28	+7.58
BCP	Pontius Mokgosane	632	5.93	−0.09
Margin of victory		587	5.51	−10.78
Total valid votes		10,651	98.59	+0.34
Rejected ballots		152	1.41	−0.34
Turnout		10,803	77.54	−0.16
Registered electors		13,932		
BNF hold		Swing	−2.19	

=== 2004 election ===
General election 2004: Kanye South
Party	Candidate	Votes	%
BNF	Omphitlhetse Maswabi	4,505	52.99
BDP	Leach Tlhomelang	3,120	36.70
BCP	Pontius Mokgosane	512	6.02
NDF	Seitshwenyeng Sebonego	365	4.29
Margin of victory		1,385	16.29
Total valid votes		8,502	98.78
Rejected ballots		151	1.22
Turnout		8,653	77.70
Registered electors		11,137	
BNF win (new seat)			

=== 1979 election ===
General election 1979: Kanye South
Party	Candidate	Votes	%	±%
BNF	Bathoen II	4,831	68.96	+2.61
BDP	Kebatshabile Disele	2,175	31.04	−2.61
Margin of victory		2,656	37.92	+5.22
Turnout		7,006	67.76	+29.64
Registered electors		10,340		
BNF hold		Swing	+2.61	

=== 1974 election ===
General election 1974: Kanye South
Party	Candidate	Votes	%	±%
BNF	Bathoen II	1,889	66.35	−4.79
BDP	Kebatshabile Disele	958	33.65	+4.79
Margin of victory		931	32.70	−9.58
Turnout		2,847	38.12	−17.92
Registered electors		7,469		
BNF hold		Swing	–4.79	

=== 1969 election ===
General election 1969: Kanye South
Party	Candidate	Votes	%	±%
BNF	Bathoen II	1,245	71.14	N/A
BDP	Quett Masire	505	28.86	−66.85
Margin of victory		740	42.28	N/A
Turnout		1,750	56.04	N/A
Registered electors		3,123		
BNF gain from BDP		Swing	+69.00	

=== 1965 election ===
General election 1965: Kanye South
Party	Candidate	Votes	%
BDP	Quett Masire	3,700	95.71
BPP	D.P. Maruping	89	2.30
BIP	M. Ketshabile	77	1.99
Margin of victory		3,611	93.40
Turnout		3,866	N/A
Registered electors		N/A	
BDP win (new seat)			
