= Olanrewaju Suleiman Afinni =

Nigerian politician

Member, Lagos State House of Assembly
- Incumbent
- Assumed office 2019
- Constituency: Lagos Island Constituency II

Personal details
- Born: 1984 (age 41–42) Lagos State, Nigeria
- Party: All Progressives Congress (APC)
- Education: University of Lagos; New York University
- Occupation: Politician, Systems Analyst
- Website: Lagos Assembly Profile

Olanrewaju Suleiman Afinni (born 1984) is a Nigerian systems analyst and politician who currently serves as a member of the Lagos State House of Assembly, representing Lagos Island Constituency II.

== Early life and education ==
Olanrewaju Afinni was born in 1984 in Lagos State. He pursued his higher education at the University of Lagos, graduating with a Bachelor of Science (B.Sc.) degree in Computer Science in 2008.

He furthered his education in the United States, obtaining a Master of Science (M.Sc.) in Information Systems. This interdisciplinary degree combined Computer Science coursework at the Courant Institute of Mathematical Sciences with Business Administration studies at the Stern School of Business, both within New York University (NYU).

== Career ==
=== Professional career ===
Afinni began his professional career in the technology sector while still an undergraduate, working as a part-time web developer starting in 2005. He is a Microsoft Certified Professional and has worked as a SAP Business One consultant.

=== Political career ===
Afinni entered legislative politics in 2019 when he was elected to represent Lagos Island Constituency II in the Lagos State House of Assembly.

During his first term in the 9th Assembly (2019–2023), he served as the Chairman of the House Committee on Science and Technology.

He was re-elected in the 2023 general elections. Upon the inauguration of the 10th Assembly, he was appointed as the Chairman of the House Committee on Environment (Ministry).
