= John Mandilas =

Nigerian Businessman

John Basil Mandilas
- Born: Greece
- Died: 1994; Nigeria
- Citizenship: Nigerian (naturalized)
- Occupation: Businessman
- Known for: Co-founded the Nigerian trading firm Mandilas and Karaberis

John Mandilas was a Greek born businessman who co-founded Mandilas and Karaberis, a trading firm that become one of the leading motor distributors in Nigeria. Mandilas was one of the pioneer naturalized Nigerian citizens.

== Career ==
Mandilas came to Nigeria in 1933, during the Great Depression, he had employment with a Greek firm and worked in many places in Nigeria including Benin city. Among his co-workers was a cousin, A.T. Karaberis. In 1943, Mandilas opened a store on Martin Street, Lagos Island. Two years, later, he entered into a partnership with Karabelis, who had left the Greek firm. Mandilas and Karaberis initially traded in general goods, textiles, beer and building materials. 1951 was an important year for the firm, that year, the firm entered into an agreement to represent Jaguar vehicles, this opened more opportunities for trading in motors. In 1953, it began to represent Volkswagen and later Triumph motorcycles. The company's motor vehicle distribution expanded into other regions of the country.

In the 1950s, Mandilas represented RCA, Carrier air conditioners and Sulzer. By 1960, it had become one of the leading motor distributors in Nigeria.

By 1981, the company had expanded into a group of companies. In 1972, Norman Industries was established to manufacture Carrier air conditioners in Nigeria. A partnership with Electrolux led to an assembly for domestic appliances and an engineering consultancy firm was established.

== Death ==
Mandilas died in 1994.
