= Olanrewaju Oshun =

Nigerian politician

Oshun Moshood Olanrewaju is a Nigerian politician. He currently serves as the Federal Representative representing Lagos Mainland constituency in the 10th National Assembly.
