= Kanye West (disambiguation) =

Kanye West (born 1977) is an American rapper, record producer and fashion designer.

Kanye West may also refer to:

- Kanye West (Botswana constituency), a parliamentary constituency in Botswana
- "Kanye West", a song by Atmosphere from the 2014 album Southsiders
- "Kanye West", a song by Young Thug from the 2016 mixtape Jeffery

== See also ==
- Kanye (disambiguation)
- West (disambiguation)
