= Adekanye =

Adékanyè
- Gender: Male
- Language: Yoruba

Origin
- Origin: Nigerian
- Meaning: The crown is next in line for the chieftaincy.
- Region of origin: South West, Nigeria

Adékanyè is a Nigerian surname. It is a male name and of Yoruba origin, which means "The crown is next in line for the chieftaincy." This distinctive and culturally rich name is often associated with those aspiring to the royal stool or chieftaincy, representing a legacy of ambition and strength.

== Notable individuals with the name ==
- Bobby Adekanye (born 1999), Nigerian footballer.
- Oladele Rufus Adekanye (born 1964), Nigerian politician.
- Tomilayo Adekanye, Nigerian agricultural economist.
