= Oladele Rufus Adekanye =

Nigerian politician

Oladele Rufus Adekanye (was born 23 September 1964) is a member of the Lagos State House of Assembly from Lagos State, Nigeria. He represents Ebute Metta Constituency in the 8th Assembly. As of November 2015 he is the House Committee Chairman on Commerce, Industry and Co-operatives. He is also a member of Health Services committee, Home Affairs committee, Judiciary, Human rights, Public petition and Lagos State Independent Electoral Commission committee, Tourism, Arts and Culture.

== Childhood and education ==
Adekanye Rufus Oladele was born in Lagos Island. His parents were Mr. Abel Olabanji Adekanye and Mrs. Felicia Yewande Adekanye. Both are from Agbonda in Kwara State and are deceased. Between 1970 and 1976, Adekanye Rufus Oladele started his education at St. Paul's (Breadfruit) Primary School, Lagos. Thereafter, he proceeded to St. Timothy's college Onike, Yaba for his secondary education between 1976 and 1978. He went to Government secondary School Omu-Aran, Kwara State. Where he completed his secondary education in 1981. He proceeded to Kwara State. College of Technology (now Kwara State Polytechnic) for his A Levels from 1981 to 1983. He then went to University OF Lagos to study history between 1984 and 1987. He earned a Bachelor of Arts (Hons) second class (Upper Division) there. He earned a master's degree in International Relations with a B+ Grade.

== Career and politics ==
Adekanye Rufus Oladele started his career as a teacher with Eruku Commercial Secondary School, Kwara State. He then worked as a bulk purchase officer in the employment bureau of Lagos Mainland Local Government. At this time he also went into politics. In 1993, he became the Social Democratic Party ward B4 secretary in Lagos Mainland Local Government. He later became the candidate in 1996 for the Lagos House Of Assembly election to represent Ebute Metta Constituency. He came second in the general election behind the United Nigeria Congress Party candidate. He was appointed as the personal assistant to the Executive Chairman of Lagos Mainland Local Government between 1999 and 2002. Adekanye Rufus Oladele was made the Special Adviser to the Executive Chairman of Lagos Mainland Local Government between 2003 and 2004. He was later appointed as the Secretary to the Lagos Mainland Local Government between 2004 and 2007. He became the Executive Chairman, Lagos Mainland Local Government, from 2008 till 2011. He contested the Lagos State House of Assembly representing Ebute Metta constituency in 2014. Through the primary election conducted on December 2, 2014, Hon. Adekanye Oladele became the flag bearer of the All Progressives Congress and on April 11, 2015, he was elected to represent Ebute Metta Constituency in the Lagos State House of Assembly.

== Personal life ==
Hon. Adekanye Rufus Oladele is a Christian and is married to Mrs. Elizabeth Anike Adekanye. They are married with children.
