= Kanye (name) =

Male given name

- Pronunciation: /ˈkɑːnjeɪ/
- Gender: Male

Origin
- Origin: Yoruba people; Igbo people; Swahili people; American people
- Meaning: Next in line (Yoruba); Let's give (Igbo); Only one (Swahili)
- Region of origin: Nigeria, South America, North America

Other names
- Related names: Adekanye, Kainene

Kanye (/ˈkɑːnjeɪ/) is a Yoruba, Igbo and Swahili name. In Yoruba culture, the name means "next in line". In Igbo culture, the name means "let's give". The name or word Kanye can also be derived from Bantu languages indigenous to the Swahili people of Eastern Africa, meaning "only one".

== People ==
- Kanye West (officially known as Ye, born 1977), American rapper, singer, musician, record producer.
- Kanye Udoh (born 2002), American football running back for the Liberty Flames.
