= Federal Medical Centre, Ebute Metta =

Hospital in Ebute-Metta, Lagos, Nigeria

Federal Medical Centre (FMC)

Geography
- Location: Lagos, Lagos State, Nigeria
- Coordinates: 6.4840°N 3.3806°E

Organisation
- Care system: Public
- Type: Teaching, Research

Services
- Emergency department: Yes
- Beds: 200

History
- Founded: November 1964

Links
- Website: https://fmceb.org

Federal Medical Centre Ebute-Metta, Lagos is a tertiary hospital located in Nigerian Railway Corporation Compound in Ebute-Metta, Lagos.

== History ==
Federal Medical Centre, Ebute-Metta, Lagos was established in 1964. It started out as the Department of Health Services of the Nigerian Railway Corporation. It was created exclusively to cater for the health needs of NRC staff and their families.

During the Nigerian Civil War, it became an annex of the Lagos University Teaching Hospital (LUTH), Idiaraba, Lagos for the treatment of wounded soldiers.

On May 26, 2004, the Federal Executive Council (FEC) approved the upgrading of the Nigerian Railway Hospital to a Federal Medical Centre and on 31 January 2005, the hospital was formally handed over to the Federal Ministry of Health as a Tertiary Healthcare Institution and designated as Federal Medical Centre, Ebute-Metta, Lagos.

It is a training institution for Resident Doctors and House Officers in Anaesthesia, Family Medicine, Obstetrics and Gynaecology, Radiology and Surgery.

== CMD ==
The present CMD of federal medical center Ebute meta is Dr Ademola Dada.

== Department ==
- Ambulance & FMC-EB Mortuary
- Accident & Emergency
- Specialist Clinic
- Administration
- Account & Finance
- Information Technology Dept.

== Project commission ==
The current Minister of State for Health and Social Welfare, Mr. Tunji Halausa, inaugurated a newly built clinical complex on January 11, 2024. The facility includes, an IVF center and several other departments within the hospital.

There is a commission, a Paediatric complex in the hospital to improve child health within and outside of the hospital.

=== Donation of equipments ===
In August 2024, there was a donation of equipments to the medical center in other to improve the health care facilities in the hospital.
