= Kanye West (Botswana constituency) =

Parliamentary constituency in the Southern District of Botswana, 2024 onwards

- Single-member constituency for the National Assembly of Botswana
- District: Southern
- Population: 36,434
- Major settlements: Kanye
- Area: 3,028 km^{2}

Current constituency
- Created: 2024
- Party: UDC
- Created from: Kanye South
- MP: Victor Phologolo
- Margin of victory: 2,335 (14.7 pp)

Kanye West is a constituency of the National Assembly of Botswana in the Southern District represented by Victor Phologolo of the Umbrella for Democratic Change since November 2024.

== Constituency profile ==
Kanye West replaces Kanye South, which had a population of 40,907 at its dissolution and an area of 1,478 km^{2}. Members of Kanye South argued that poor infrastructure made it hard to traverse the district and larger villages were being favored over small ones. Four solutions were proposed: adjust the borders of Kanye South, divide Kanye North and Kanye South into three constituencies, expand and then split Kanye South, or rename Kanye South to Ngwaketse. The Delimitation Commission decided on the first option, changing the boundaries of Kanye South and renaming it Kanye West. The constituency, predominantly rural and anchored around parts of Kanye encompasses the following localities:

1. Western part of Kanye
2. Selokolela
3. Gasita
4. Lorolwane

== Election results ==
=== 2024 election ===
General election 2024: Kanye West
Party	Candidate	Votes	%
UDC	Victor Phologolo	8,480	53.32
BDP	Lemogang Kwape	6,145	38.64
BCP	Pako Madigele	1,278	8.04
Margin of victory		2,335	14.68
Total valid votes		15,903	98.80
Rejected ballots		193	1.20
Turnout		16,096	81.71
Registered electors		19,711	
UDC notional gain from BDP			
