= Kanye Airport =

Airport serving the town of Kanye, Botswana

- IATA: none; ICAO: FBKY

Summary
- Serves: Kanye, Botswana
- Elevation AMSL: 4,199 ft (1,280 m)
- Coordinates: 25°03′00″S 25°19′07″E

Map
- Location of airport in Botswana

Runways
Direction	Length		Surface
Direction	m	ft	Surface
03/21	1,110	3,642	Grass
- Source: GCM Google Maps

Kanye Airport (ICAO: FBKY) is an airport serving the town of Kanye, Botswana. The runway is 5 kilometres (3.1 mi) south of the town.

== See also ==
- Transport in Botswana
- List of airports in Botswana
