= Michael Cruz Kayne =

American stand-up comedian

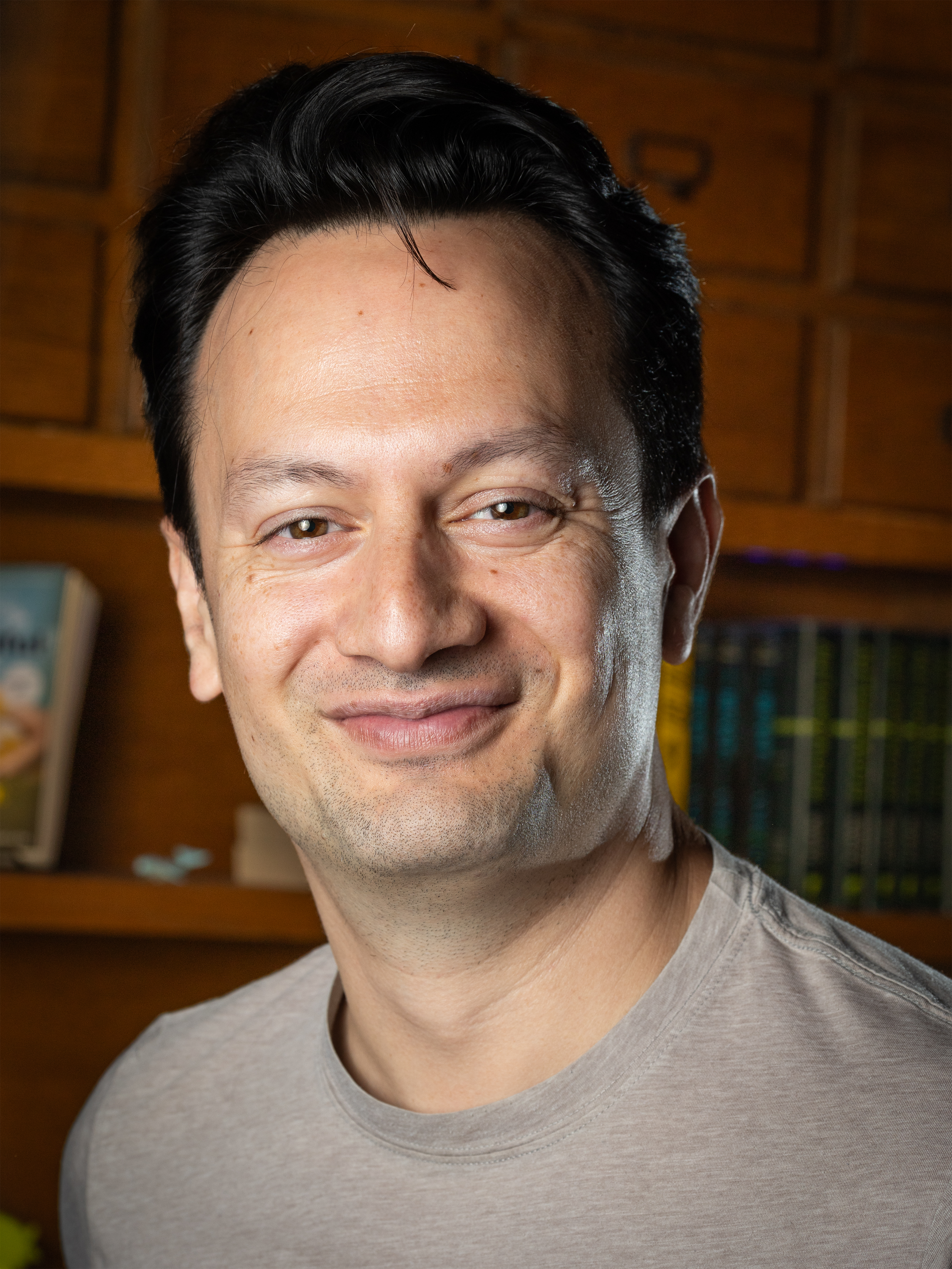
- Michael Cruz Kayne in 2026
- Occupations: Comedian; actor; writer
- Years active: 2010s–present
- Known for: The Late Show with Stephen Colbert, Sorry for Your Loss

Michael Cruz Kayne is an American comedian, actor, and writer. He is a Peabody Award- and Writers Guild of America Award-winning writer on The Late Show with Stephen Colbert and the creator and performer of the solo show Sorry for Your Loss, which premiered at the Minetta Lane Theatre and was nominated for both a Drama Desk Award and a Lucille Lortel Award. In November 2019, Kayne gained widespread attention when his Twitter thread about the death of his infant son went viral, prompting more than 140,000 responses and coverage in The Washington Post and on Today.

== Career ==
=== Early career ===
Kayne studied musical theater in college before moving into comedy and writing. He became a performer at the Upright Citizens Brigade Theatre in New York City. He co-created the web series Terrible Babysitters with D'Arcy Carden, which screened at SXSW, and co-wrote and starred in the pilot Good Dads, which was presented at the New York Television Festival. He served as a creative consultant for Billy on the Street and wrote for the pilot presentation of @midnight.

=== Television writing ===
Kayne joined the writing staff of The Late Show with Stephen Colbert on CBS. His work on the show has earned him a Peabody Award and a Writers Guild of America Award. He has received multiple Primetime Emmy Award nominations as a writer on The Late Show and on Stephen Colbert's Election Night 2020: Democracy's Last Stand: Building Back America Great Again Better 2020 on Showtime.

=== Acting ===
As an actor, Kayne has appeared in television series including Severance on Apple TV+; High Maintenance and White House Plumbers on HBO; and Late Night with Seth Meyers as a stand-up performer. He has also appeared on The Chris Gethard Show.

=== Sorry for Your Loss ===
In November 2019, on the tenth anniversary of his son Fisher's death, Kayne wrote a thread on Twitter about grief and loss that received more than 140,000 responses. The thread, and the public response to it, became the basis for his solo show Sorry for Your Loss.

The show premiered in 2023 at the Minetta Lane Theatre in New York City, produced by Audible Theater and directed by Josh Sharp. The Off-Broadway run was extended ahead of its May 8 opening night. A comedy album was released on Audible and was named a Best of Audible selection in 2023.

Sorry for Your Loss received nominations for the 2024 Lucille Lortel Award for Outstanding Solo Show and the 2024 Drama Desk Award for Outstanding Solo Performance. A filmed version was released on Dropout on March 27, 2026 as part of the second season of the platform's stand-up comedy series Dropout Presents.

== Personal life ==
Kayne lives in New York City with his wife, Carrie. Their son Fisher Daniel Kayne died of sepsis at 34 days old in 2009; Fisher's identical twin brother, Truman, survived. They also have a daughter, Willa. After Fisher's death, Carrie Kayne became a pediatric intensive care nurse.

Kayne's father, an endocrinologist, is of Ashkenazi Jewish descent. His mother is a Catholic first-generation immigrant from the Philippines. Kayne's sister is actress Ana Cruz Kayne.
