= Sesung =

- Village
- Location in Botswana
- Coordinates: 24°6′0″S 24°55′3″E
- Country: Botswana
- District: Kweneng District

Population (2001)
  - Total: 1,281

Sesung is a village in Kweneng District of Botswana, located 85 km north-west of Molepolole. The population was 1,281 in the 2001 census.
