= Richard Kayne =

Richard Kayne may refer to:

- Richard Kayne (investor) (born 1945 or 1946), American billionaire private equity investor
- Richard S. Kayne (born 1944), American linguist and professor at New York University

== See also ==
- Richard Kane (1662–1736), Irish soldier who served in British Army on Minorca
- Richard Rutledge Kane (1877–1958), British Commissioner of Solomon Islands Protectorate
