= Ana Cruz Kayne =

American actress

- Born: April 28, 1984 (age 42)
- Occupation: Actress
- Years active: 2007–present

Ana Cruz Kayne (born April 28, 1984) is an American actress. She is best known for her performances in Barbie, Little Women, Jerry & Marge Go Large and Painkiller.

== Personal life ==
Her mother is a Catholic Filipino immigrant and her father is of Ashkenazi Jewish descent. Her brother is comedian and actor Michael Cruz Kayne.

== Filmography ==
=== Film ===
Year	Title	Role	Notes
2008	Uncertainty	Beth	
2010	The Beginner	Gabi	
2010	Art House	Becky	
2011	Another Earth	Claire	
2012	Jagoo	Elodie	Short film
2013	The Exit Room	Sarah	Short film
2014	Saint Janet	Mara	
2015	Beatbox	Rye	
2016	A Woman, a Part	Narrator	Voice
2016	The Creek When He Came Back	Chris	
2016	Baby Teeth	Alex	Short film
2019	Depraved	Liz	
2019	Anya	Fausta	
2019	Little Women	Olivia	
2022	Jerry & Marge Go Large	Heather	
2022	Susie Searches	Misty Consuelos	
2023	Barbie	Judge Barbie	

=== Television ===
Year	Title	Role	Notes
2007	Guiding Light	Juvenil Delinquent	Episode dated April 11, 2007
2009	Law & Order	Dena Milner	Episode: "All New"
2009	Rescue Me	Girl Hipster #2	Episode: "French"
2010	Louie	Jasmine	Episode: "Double Date/Mom"
2017	Blue Bloods	Officer Bryson	Episode: "Not Fade Away"
2017	Bull	Dylan Hyland	Episode: "Free Fall"
2017	The Bold Type	Mia Lawrence	Episode: "Carry the Weight"
2018	Now and Then	Jane	Television film
2019	The Enemy Within	Mendoza	2 episodes
2022	Partner Track	Lacey	Recurring role
2023	Painkiller	Brianna Ortiz	6 episodes
2023	Lioness	Means	Episode: "Truth Is the Shrewdest Lie"
