= Ebute Metta =

Neighbourhood of Lagos, Nigeria

Coordinates: 6°28′20″N 3°22′50″E

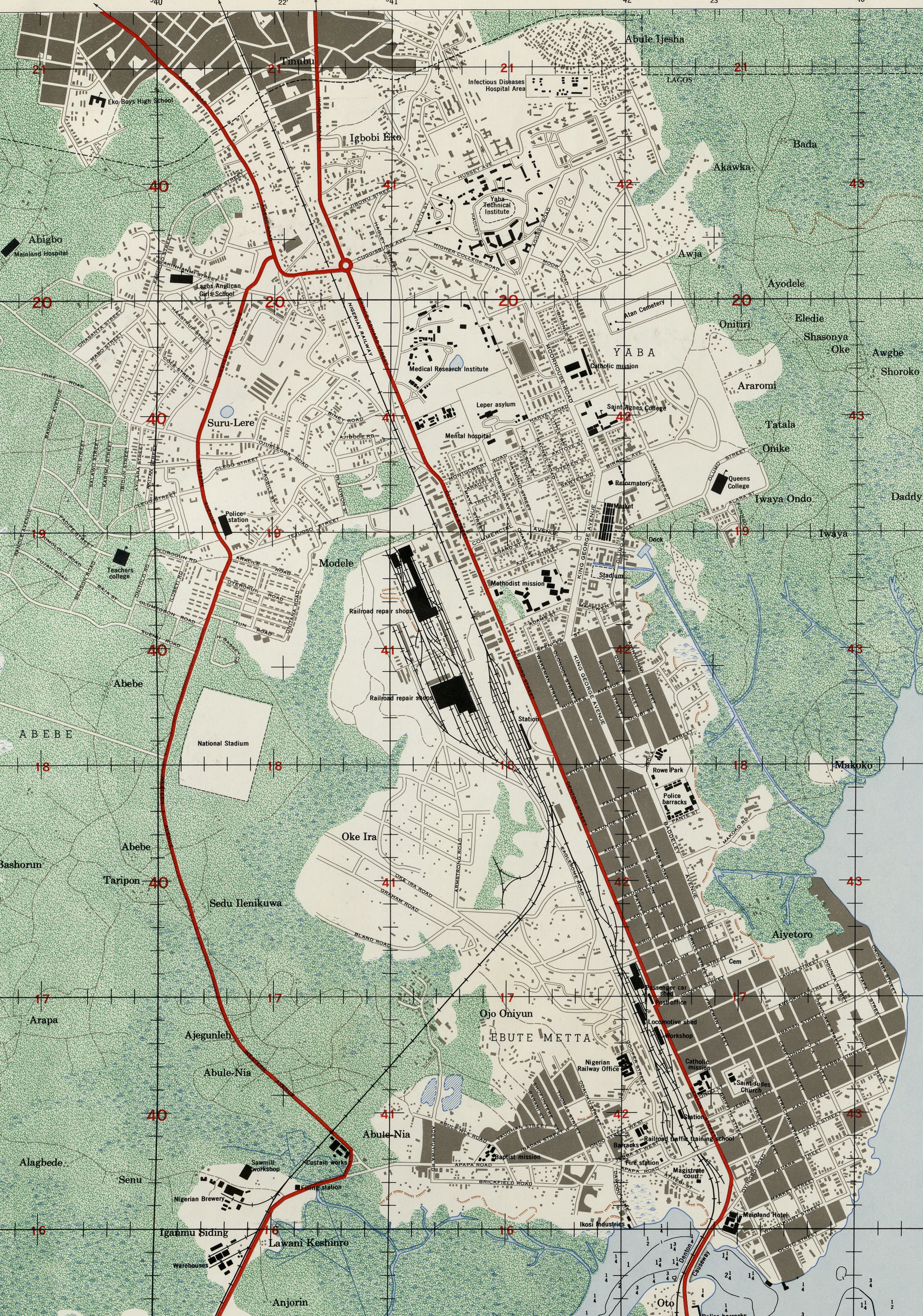
1962 map showing Ebute Metta in the south

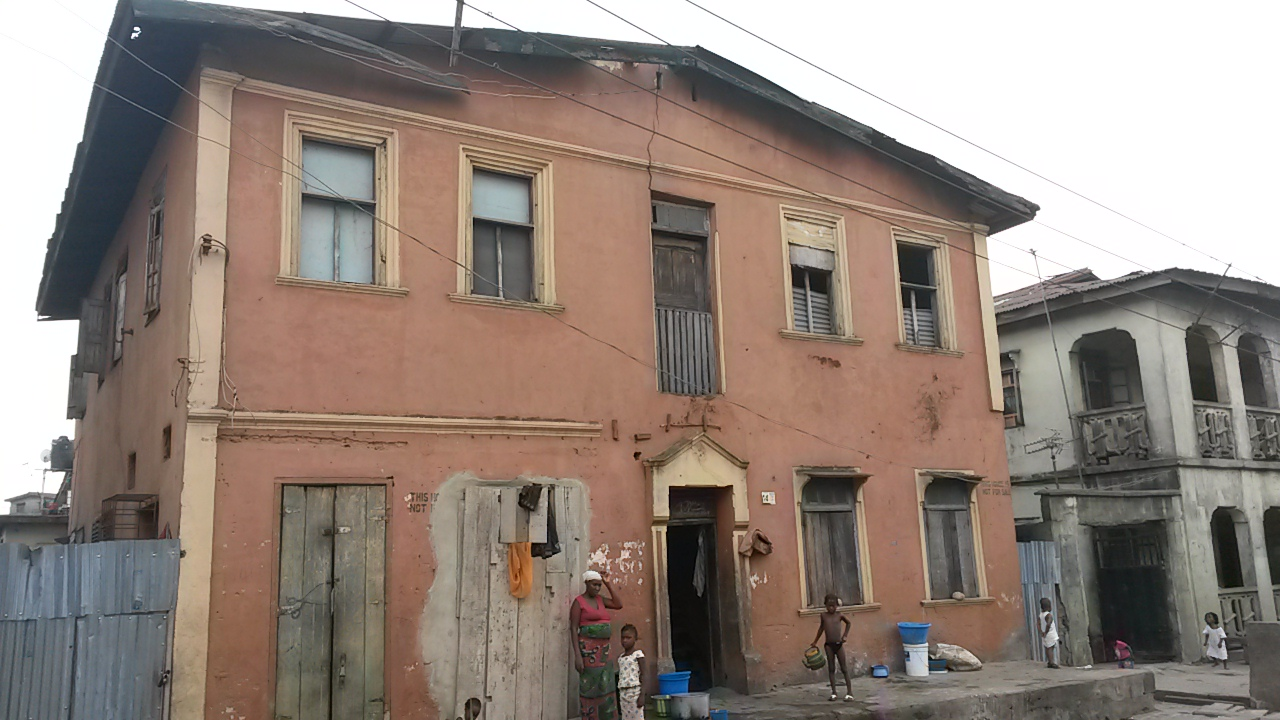
A house in Ebute Metta

Ebute Metta is a neighbourhood of Lagos Mainland, Lagos, in Lagos State, Nigeria.

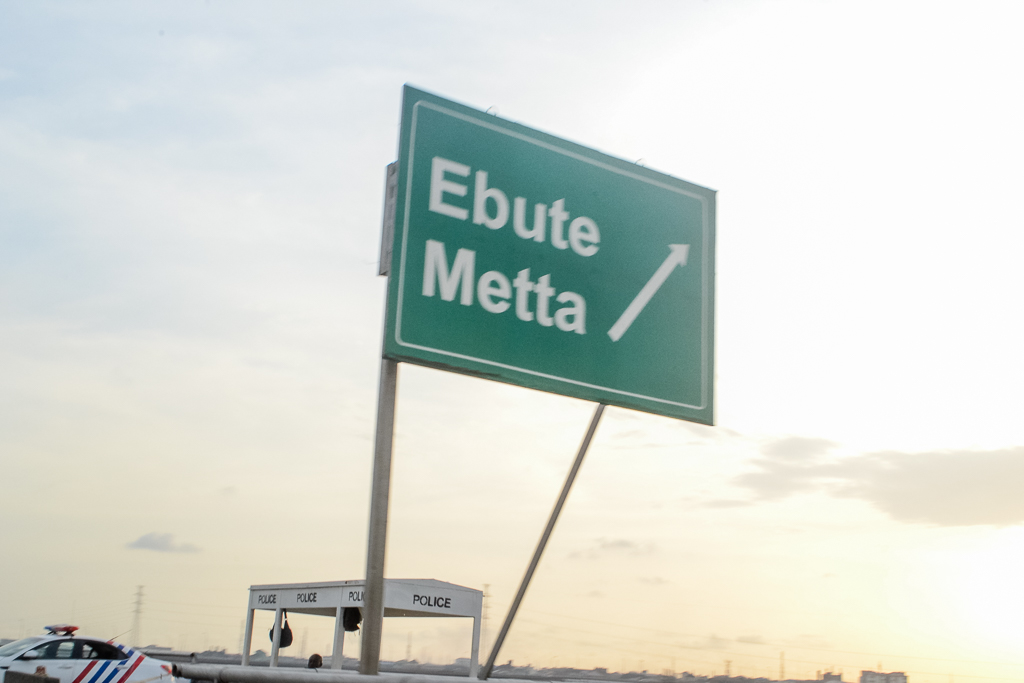
Ebute Metta sign-post

== History ==
Ebute Metta is known for the production and sale of local food and cloths. It is a very old part of Lagos State, many of its houses were built during the colonial era using Brazilian architecture.

== Pre-colonial history ==
Ebute Metta is part of the Awori Kingdom of Otto. Its capital is at Otto just before Iddo on the way to Lagos Island. Ebute Metta means "The three Harbours" in the Yoruba language. This was in reference to Iddo, Otto and Oyingbo. In the olden days the king, Oba Oloto of Otto, controlled these harbours and had his agents collect taxes from ships bringing goods to Lagos through them.

== Ago Egba ==
In 1867, there was a great tension between the Christian community and adherents of the traditional religion in Abeokuta which was on the verge of snowballing into a sectarian crisis. On the eve of the departure of some European missionaries from Abeokuta, the native Christian converts - fearing that the dominant traditionalists would descend on them in the absence of their European protectors - begged the Europeans to take them along to Lagos.

On getting to the colony, the European missionaries went to the king of Lagos to ask him to allocate land for the Egba Christians from Abeokuta. In response, the king said Lagos Island was already filled up and he couldn't afford to give the little available land to the Egba people. Instead he suggested that the Colonial Governor, John Hawley Glover, contact his brother Oba, the Oloto, whose territory was located just across the lagoon. Governor Glover approached the Oloto, who agreed to give the Egbas a large tract of land from Oyingbo (Coates Street) to somewhere just before the lands of Yaba begin (Glover Street, where LSDPC Estate was later built about 130 years later).

These Egba Christians - some of whom were Saros and Amaros - then formed a community which they called Ago Egba, the Yoruba for "Egba Camp". They built their church, St. Jude's Church, schools to educate their children, and trading concerns, and they divided the land into streets which were originally named after their European missionaries and colonial officers. The streets were also named after some of the Egba chiefs like Oloye Osholake. Thus we had Clifford Street (since renamed Murtala Muhammad Way), Griffith Street, Freeman Street, King George V Street (since renamed Herbert Macaulay Street), Cemetery Street, Bola Street, Osholake Street, Tapa Street and Okobaba Street.

The Egba people went on to form the first set of civil servants in Nigeria. After the amalgamation of 1914 and the construction of railways, Ebute Metta became a great destination for many people coming from the hinterland to Lagos, many of whom couldn't get accommodation on the Island (reserved for only the Europeans and upper class Nigerians).

The Ago Egba people in Ebute Metta constructed the Lisabi Hall which was commissioned in 1938, by which time their third generation descendants had become the engineers, technicians and stationmasters of the Nigerian Railway Corporation with stations and offices nearby.

== Buildings ==
Ebute Metta has a number of notable buildings including the Nigerian Railway Corporation headquarters, the post office, St. Paul's Catholic Church, the Oyingbo Market, a major bus terminal, Foucos Secondary School (a school built by the former minister for education), St. Saviour's School, Junior Strides Academy, Ajayi Memorial Hospital, Ijero Baptist Church Nursery and Primary School, Ebute Metta Health Centre, Federal Medical Centre Ebute Metta, and shops of all types. Ebute Metta is divided into two main areas: Ebute Metta East and Ebute Metta West.

== Transport ==
Ebute Metta is a main access route linking mainland Lagos to the three main islands of Victoria, Ikoyi and Lagos Island. A major network of flyovers and access roads connects these various parts of Lagos throughout the Iddo peninsula.
