= Tomilayo Adekanye =

Nigerian agricultural economics professor

Professor of Agricultural Economics at Babcock University

Personal details
- Born: September 2, 1942 (age 83)

Tomilayo Adekanye is a Nigerian professor of agricultural economics. She was the first female professor in any agricultural-related field in Nigeria, and the first in agricultural economics in Africa.

== Career ==
She commenced her university teaching career as staff member of Department of Agricultural Economics at Obafemi Awolowo University (then University of Ife) between 1966 and 1975. She moved subsequently to University of Ibadan's Department of Agricultural Economics, as Lecturer I (1975), rising to the ranks of Senior Lecturer (1977), Associate Professor (Reader), and, in 1980, to the full position of Professor in 1983. Between 1990 and 1991, she was the Commissioner for Trade and Investment in Oyo State. She is also a one-time commissioner of agriculture in the state.

Organizations and agencies with which she has previously consulted at the international level include ECA, ILO, FAO, IFAD, UNDP, UNICEF, UNIFEM, and Ford Foundation.

She presently lectures at Babcock University. In 1984, she conducted another study that cuts across women in the main ethnic groups in Nigeria. The findings from the study titled, Women in agriculture in Nigeria: Problems and policies for development, was that for women to be able to maximize what agriculture has to offer, there needs to be a mechanism in-place that will ensure both academic and financial stability.

== Education and publications ==
According to Google Scholar, her most cited paper is a 1988 4-year study titled "Women and Rural Poverty: Some Considerations From Nigeria", which focuses on how women engaging in agriculture in Southwestern Nigeria are not fairly incorporated in the system, thereby causing them to lag behind men in terms of development.

She has also authored several books on agriculture, such as: Women in Agriculture in Nigeria (Addis, ECA, 1981), Women in Agriculture (Institute of African Studies, University of Ibadan, 1988), Readings in Agricultural Marketing (Ibadan, Longman, 1988), African Women in Agriculture (Ibadan, CEGGAD, 2004), and some 75 other publications contributed as chapters in books, articles in peer-reviewed and learned journals, and monographs and technical reports.

== Personal life ==
She is married to J. 'Bayo Adekanye, an emeritus professor of political science and immediate past chairman of the governing council of Chrisland University they are both blessed with two children, Deaconess Ayomide Balogun (Nee Adekanye) and Dr J.'Bayo Adekanye who are respectively based in the UK and Canada.
