= Kanye, Botswana =

Kanye
- Village
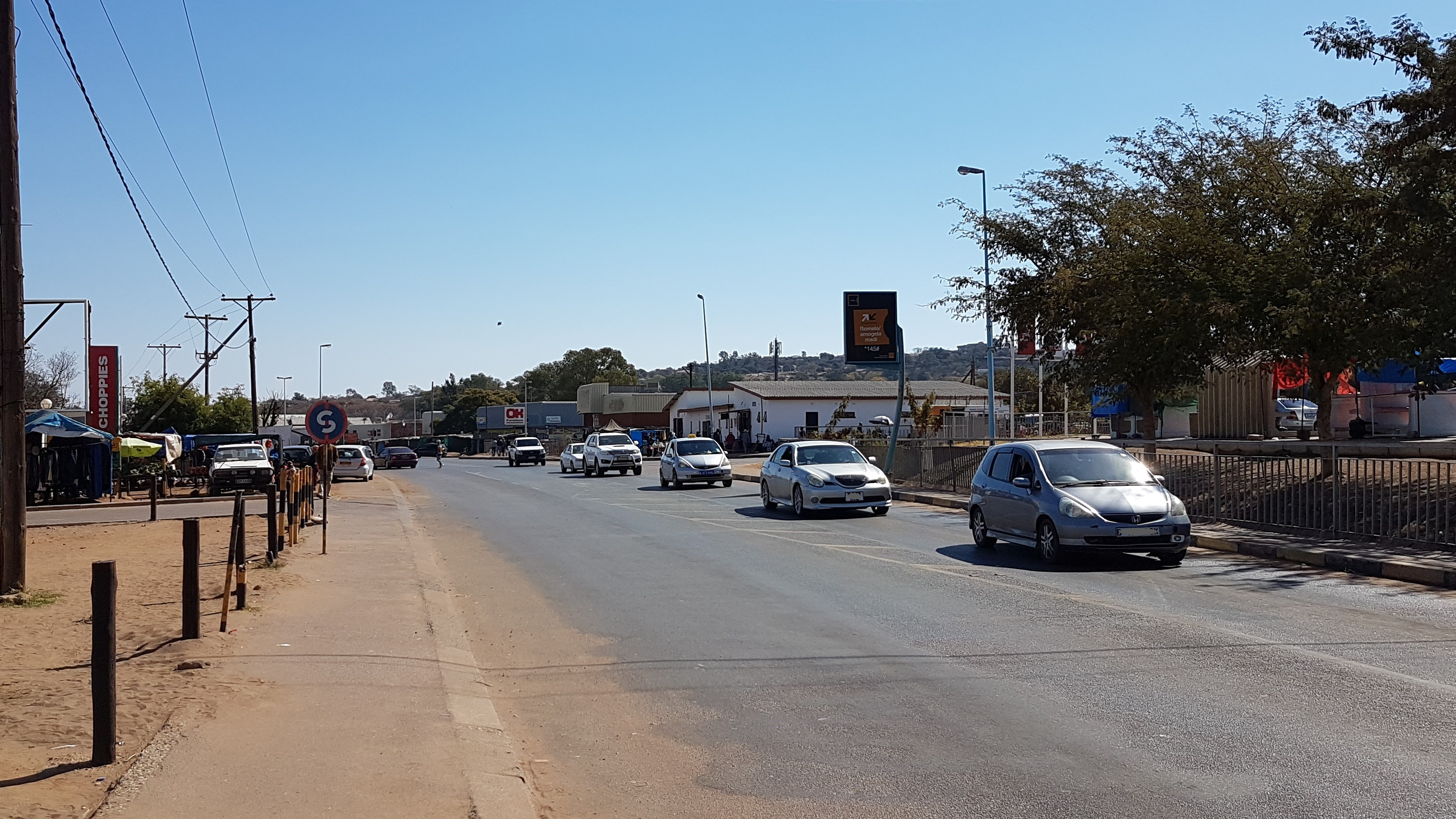
- Main road in Kanye

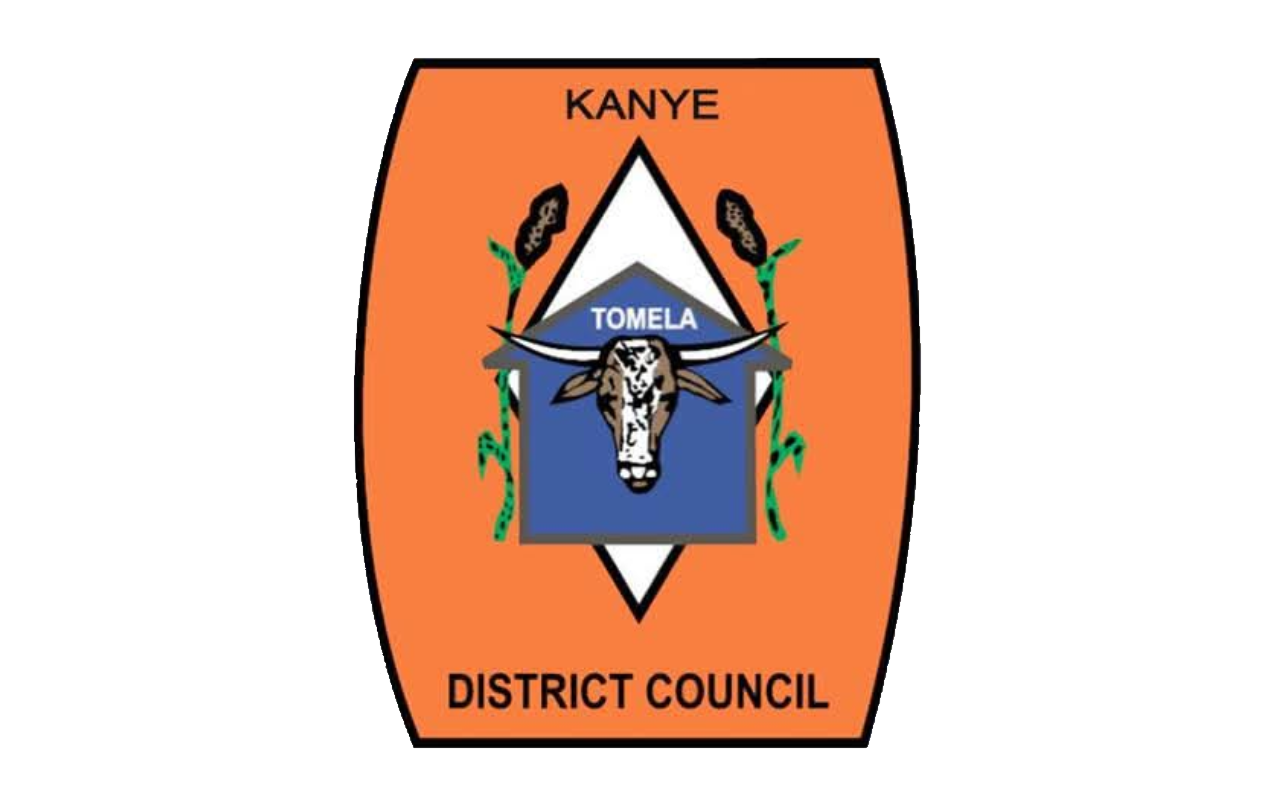
- Flag

- Location within Botswana
- Coordinates: 24°59′S 25°21′E
- Country: Botswana
- District: Southern District
- Sub-district: Kanye
- Elevation: 1,306 m (4,285 ft)

Population (2022)
  - Total: 48,028
- Time zone: UTC+2 (Central Africa Time)
- Geographical area code: 54X
- Climate: BSh

Kanye is a village in southern Botswana, located 83 kilometres (52 mi) south-west of the capital, Gaborone. It is the administrative centre of the Southern District, and had a population of 48,028 as of the 2022 Population and Housing Census. This is an increase compared to the 45,196 of the 2011 census, making it the ninth-largest village in the country. Kanye is the traditional capital of the Ngwaketse tribe, who first settled in the area in the 1790s. The village is the longest continuously-occupied tribal capital in the country.

== Geography ==
Kanye lies on a series of hills which form a natural protective barrier against the sands of the Kalahari Desert. The hills extend into the Bushveld region of South Africa. The most notable hill in Kanye is Kgwakgwe hill. There are reports of Manganese mineralization at Kgwakgwe Hill valued at over 3 billion US dollars, and Giyani Metals is expected to begin mining operations by 2026.

There is a deep natural gorge called Pharing Gorge in the village, which was reputedly used as a hiding place for villagers during the Mfecane wars of the 19th century. Kanye also has two natural dams: Mmamokhasi Dam and Mmakgodumo Dam.

== History ==
Kanye was established in the 1790s by Makaba, the paramount chief of the Ngwaketse (a tribe of the larger Tswana people). He moved his tribe to Kanye after losing a battle to the nearby Kwena tribe, fortifying the existing Kanye Hill with stone walls. In about 1798, Kanye was attacked by an alliance of Rolong and Griquas, but the Ngwaketse were able to repel the attack and kill their opponents' leader. European traders and hunters began visiting Kanye in the early 19th century, but it was not until the reign of Gaseitsiwe (who became chief of the Ngwaketse in 1845) that they began to actually settle in the area. In 1852, Joseph McCabe, a British trader, crossed the Kalahari Desert from south to north, beginning in Kanye and ending at Lake Ngami.

In June 1854, Robert Moffat passed through Kanye on his way north to the lands of the Matabele. He and his party found the town "completely destroyed as a result of the wars with the Boers", with the Ngwaketse living in the ruins. By the 1860s, Kanye had been rebuilt and was prospering as a trading centre for ivory, animal skins, and ostrich feathers. Although Kanye had received semi-regular visits from missionaries, a formal mission was not established until 1871, when the London Missionary Society sent a representative. In 1887, following the establishment of the Bechuanaland Protectorate in 1885, a small British-run police station was established. In 1899, during the Second Boer War, the Ngwaketse allied with the British, with Kanye at one stage hosting a 500-strong column under the command of Colonel Herbert Plumer. In the early 20th century, Kanye became the first village in the Bechuanaland Protectorate to introduce irrigation projects and public standpipes. An asbestos mine opened in the 1920s. Former Vice-President and 2nd President of Botswana, Quett Masire was born in Kanye on 24 July 1926 and was buried in his home village after his death on 22 June 2017.

== Subdivisions ==
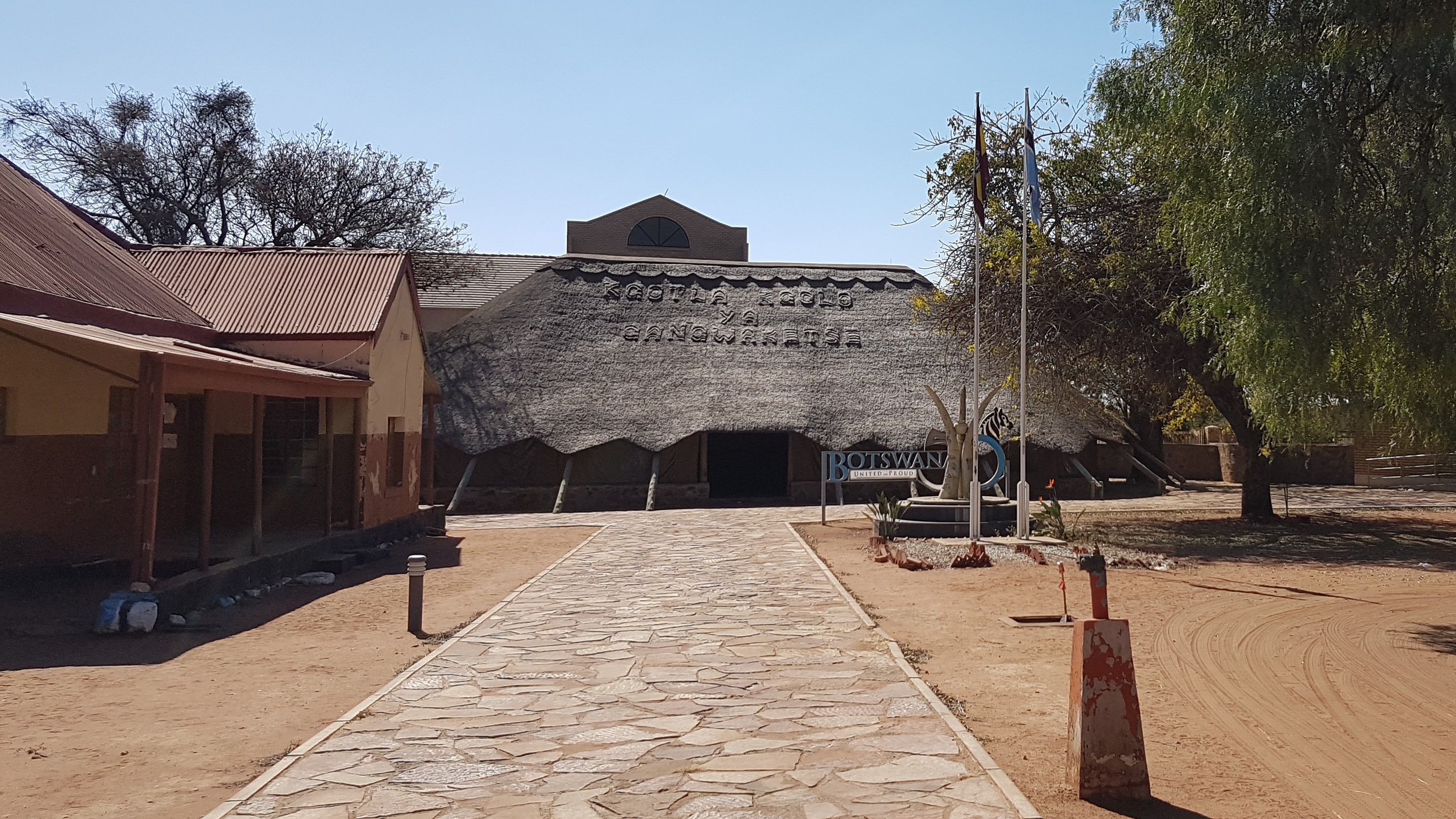
Kgotla Kgolo ya Bangwaketse village

The village is divided into several wards. Each ward has a kgosana which is responsible for the cultural administration of the ward. The wards are further divided into small divisions that have headsmen. The following are some of the wards found in Kanye which are further divided into small wards

- Ntsweng
- Tloung
- Kgwatlheng
- Mongala
- Goolobeko
- Gasebako
- Kgatleng
- Sebego
- Gooruele
- Gookgano
- GooLogaba
- Mmamokhasi
- Losabanyane
- Mokuete
- Lodubeng

== Major facilities ==
- National Food Technology Research Centre
- Mmakgodumo Dam
- Kanye Education Centre
- Kanye Brigade
- Seepapitso Senior Secondary School
- Kanye Seventh Day Adventist Hospital
- Maranatha Academy of Excellence

== Government ==
Kanye and the surrounding area are divided into two parliamentary constituencies, Kanye East and Kanye West, both of which elect a single member to the National Assembly. These constituencies were renamed from their original names of Kanye North and Kanye South in 2024 following boundary changes. During the 2019 general election, Thapelo Letsholo was elected as a member of parliament for Kanye North while Lemogang Kwape was elected as member of parliament for Kanye South. They are both members of the Botswana Democratic Party. At the 2014 general election, Kanye North was won by Patrick Ralotsia of the Botswana Democratic Party and Kanye South was won by Abram Kesupile of the Umbrella for Democratic Change. At the 2024 general election, both constituencies returned members of the Umbrella for Democratic Change (UDC), respectively Mogorosi Mosanana and Victor Phologolo.

=== Economy ===
Kanye is classified as an urban village due to its population size and the definition of a village as defined in the 2011 Population and Housing Census Report. A village is a settlement officially designated as such and has a Tribal Administration, a District Administration and a District Council. The village also has a tribal authority (a Chief, a Tribal Authority, and two Chief’s Representative or Headman) and availability of certain facilities such as schools, clinics or health centres, police offices, water reticulation, etc.

== Transportation ==
The main method of transport in and out of Kanye is via the highway system. Kanye is directly connected to Gaborone through the A10 road, and the A2 highway also passes through the village. The A2 forms part of the Trans-Kalahari Corridor, linking Walvis Bay, Namibia, with Pretoria, South Africa. Kanye is additionally served by Kanye Airport (ICAO: FBKY), which is one of only two airports in Southern District (along with the private Jwaneng Airport, which services the Jwaneng diamond mine).

== Notable people ==
- Quett Masire, former President of Botswana from 1980 to 1998
- Archibald Mogwe, former Foreign Minister of Botswana from 1974 to 1985
- Banjo Mosele, singer-songwriter who has toured with Hugh Masekela
- 'Makabelo Mosothoane, cabinet minister in Lesotho
- Barolong Seboni, poet and columnist for the Botswana Guardian
- Letsile Tebogo, sprinter, Olympic Gold medal 200 m, Paris 2024.
