= Thapelo Letsholo (politician) =

Motswana politician and entrepreneur

Member of Parliament for Kanye North
- In office 2019–2024
- Succeeded by: Constituency abolished

Finance and Estimates parliament committee (Chairman)
- Constituency: Kanye North

Thapelo Letsholo is a Motswana politician and entrepreneur. He was Member of Parliament for Kanye North constituency from 2019 to 2024. He is a member of the Botswana Democratic Party.

== Early life ==
Thapelo Letsholo was born in Kanye, Botswana. He then attended his early education in Jwaneng, Botswana and his senior secondary education in Lobatse, Botswana. Letsholo studied Psychology and Organisational Psychology at the University of Cape Town (UCT) and graduated in 2000. He was the President of the UCT Psychology Association.

== Career ==
Letsholo began his career in the corporate sector in 2001. He worked for a variety of companies, and by 2008 was the Corporate Affairs & Strategy Director at Kgalagadi Breweries Limited. Upon leaving the corporate sector in 2011, Letsholo established various entrepreneurial ventures including RedPepper PR & Communications Consultancy, Best of Publishing, and Kamoso Consulting and Drillonic. He also served as a Trustee on the Kgalagadi Beverages Trust Board of Trustees from 2011 to 2014.

Letsholo began his political career in 2018 when he was elected Member of Parliament for the Kanye North constituency in the Primary Election. He then went on to represent the Botswana Democratic Party in the 2019 general elections and won by a record breaking margin in the history of the constituency.

Letsholo has had a number of Motions adopted by Parliament since coming into office. Key among them include a Motion that the local distribution, courier and transportation of goods in Botswana be reserved for 100% citizen owned companies and that all foreign transport and courier companies be only allowed a single drop off once they arrive in Botswana.

Letsholo is a member of the following committees of the Botswana Parliament:

- Finance and Estimates committee (Chairman)
- Finance, Trade and Economic Development
- Statutory Bodies and State Enterprises
- Communications, Works, Transport and Technology
- Youth, Sports, Arts and Culture
- Government Assurances
