= Lagos Mainland =

- LGA and suburb
- Interactive map of Lagos Mainland
- Country: Nigeria
- State: Lagos State
- City: Lagos
- Headquarter: Ebute Metta
- Time zone: UTC+1 (WAT)
- postal code: 100001

Lagos Mainland is a local government area in the Lagos Division of Lagos State, Nigeria. It is located in central Lagos and has its headquarters at Ebute Metta. Lagos Mainland can also be used to refer to the larger part of Lagos separated from the islands, especially Lagos Island.

Lagos Mainland Local Government is one of the most densely populated areas in Lagos State with a population of over 500,000 people according to the 2006 Nigerian census, with a mix of residential, commercial, and industrial areas. It is home to several major educational institutions such as the University of Lagos, Yaba College of Technology, and the Federal Science and Technology College.

The local government area is also known for its vibrant markets, including the popular Tejuosho Market, where a wide range of goods can be found. In addition, it is home to several notable landmarks and tourist attractions, such as the National Stadium, Lagos and Lagos City Mall.

Notable towns and areas within the Lagos Mainland local government include Otto/Iddo, Olaleye Village, Maroko, Ebute Metta, Glover, Oko-Baba, Oyadiran Estate, Abule-Oja, Iwaya, Yaba, and Igbobi.
