= Lagos Island =

Lagos Island Ìsàlẹ̀ Èkó
- Island and LGA
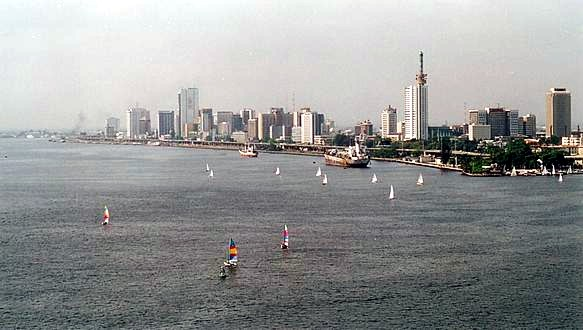
- Lagos Island skyline
- Nickname: Lasgidi
- Interactive map of Lagos Island
- Lagos Island shown within Nigeria
- Coordinates: 6°27′N 3°24′E
- Country: Nigeria
- State: Lagos State
- City: Lagos

Area
  - Total: 9.26 km^{2} (3.58 sq mi)

Population (2022)
  - Total: 314,900
  - Density: 34,000/km^{2} (88,100/sq mi)
- Time zone: UTC+1 (WAT)
- postal code: 101001

Lagos Island (Yoruba: Ìsàlẹ̀ Èkó) is an island and local government area of Lagos State. It is the principal and central area in Lagos, Nigeria and was the capital of Lagos State until 1957. It is part of the Lagos Division. As of the preliminary 2006 Nigerian census, the LGA had a population of 209,437 within an area of just 8.7 km^{2}. The LGA only covers the western half of Lagos Island; the eastern half is simply referred to as Lagos Island East LCDA.

Lagos Island can also be used ro refer to the affluent part of Lagos separated by creeks, lagoons and rivers which is distinct from the Mainland.

== Overview ==
Lying on Lagos Lagoon, a large protected harbour on the coast of Africa, the island is home to the Yoruba fishing village of Eko, which grew into the modern city of Lagos. The city has now spread out to cover the neighboring islands as well as the adjoining mainland.

Lagos Island is connected to the mainland by three large bridges (the Carter Bridge, the Eko Bridge and the Third Mainland Bridge) which cross Lagos Lagoon to the district of Ebute Metta. It is also linked to the neighboring island of Ikoyi and to Victoria Island. The Lagos harbor district of Apapa faces the western side of the island. Forming the main commercial district of Lagos, Lagos Island plays host to the main government buildings, shops and offices. The Catholic and Anglican Cathedrals, as well as the Central Mosque, are located here.

Historically, Lagos Island (Isale Eko) was home to the Brazilian Quarter of Lagos where the majority of the slave trade returnees from Brazil stayed. Many families lived on Broad Street in the Marina.

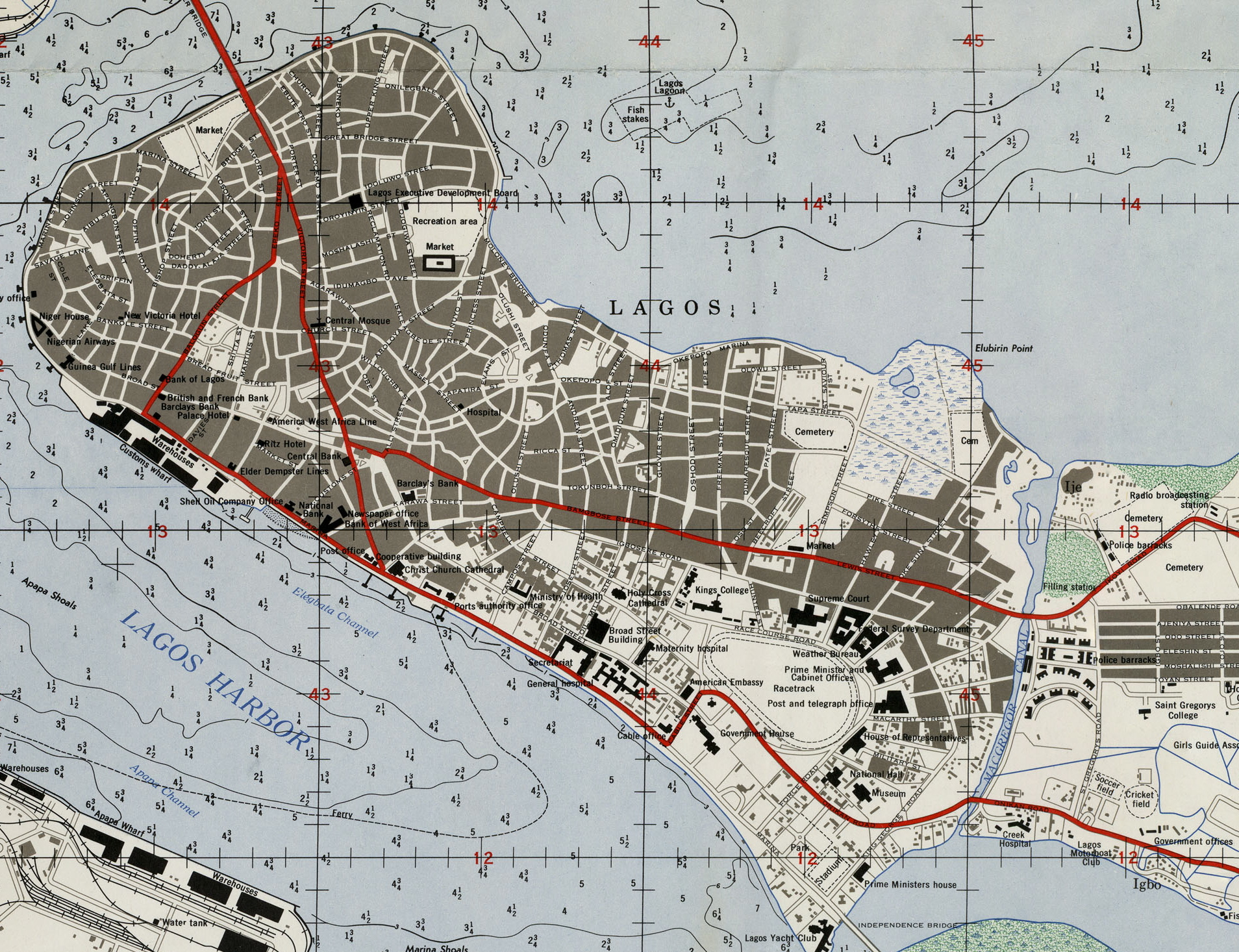
Detailed map of Lagos Island c.1960

The poor eastern side of the island contains the main markets and poor housing and is overcrowded. It is the part of Lagos where the Oba (king) of Lagos resides. It is also believed that the Eyo festival can only be held in this part of Lagos.

== Economy ==
Most Nigerian banks' head offices are located on Lagos Island.First Bank of Nigeria is one of the Nigerian banks with its head office in Marina, Lagos Island. Another bank that has its head office situated in Lagos Island is the United Bank for Africa (UBA). Other medium and large-scale businesses such as real estate consultancy firms, electrical appliances manufacturers and retail stores are based in Marina, Lagos Island.

== Landmarks and tourist attractions ==
=== Tom Jones Memorial Hall and Library ===
Located on Nnamdi Azikiwe Street, Idumota, formerly Victoria St, Tom Jones Memorial hall is noteworthy as the venue of the call for positive action by zikists in November 1948. The hall was built by trustees selected by Mr Thomas Jones who died in 1913. In his will, he bequeathed the land and funds for a hall and library in his memorial.

=== Freedom Park ===
Freedom Park is becoming a major tourist attraction and it is located on Lagos Island. The park was formerly a prison yard, back when the country was still under colonial rule and was known then as Her Majesty's Broad Street Prisons. Freedom Park was created to serve as a national memorial in remembrance of the nation's founding fathers who struggled against colonial rule and fought for the country's independence. The park was opened in 2010 to celebrate Nigeria's 50th independence celebration. The park is now a tourist attraction to both locals and foreigners and you can actually find historical statues all over the park. There is also an amphitheater which holds concerts, music shows, and drama presentations. You can also relax by the numerous ponds and fountains at the park or visit the Wole Soyinka Art Gallery to view unique art presentations.

=== Marina Road ===
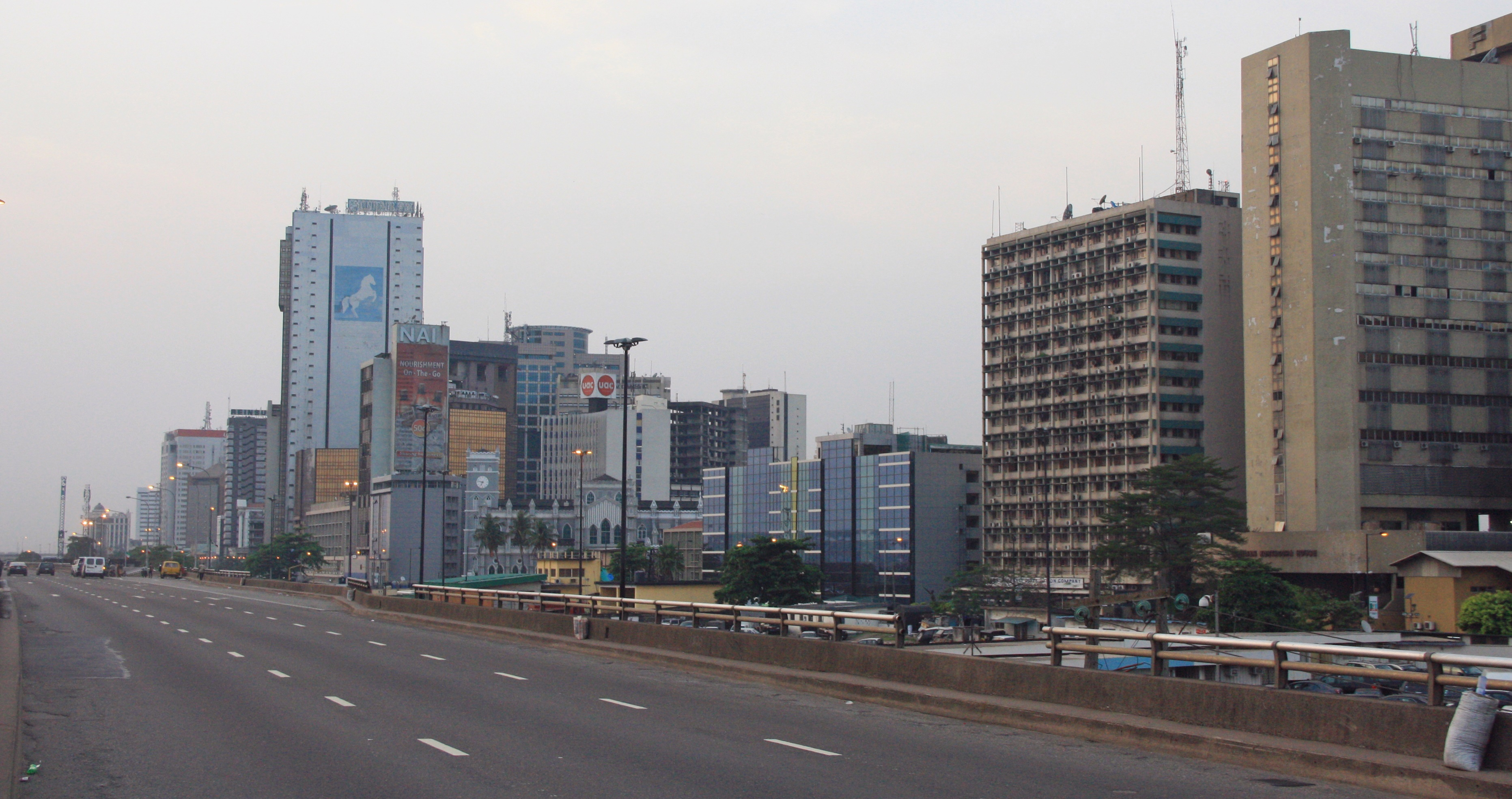
Coastal Ring road in the foreground, parallel to Marina road and its Marina skyline in the background

The Lagos Marina is host to a number of office buildings, and other structures such as the Bookshop House which was formerly owned by CMS and the Cathedral Church of Christ. Due to the conditions of the soil, the foundations of most of the tall buildings are either piled or raft. Buildings along the marina include National House now occupied by Shell and it is the first tall office building at Marina. The former Central Bank headquarters and the Investment House, headquarters of Bank of Industry were both built-in 1960. The land on which the Investment House was built previously housed the Grand Hotel before it was demolished. New Africa House of UAC, Elder Dempster House, Nigerian Ports Authority head office and National Electric Power Authority's former headquarters are all located along the marina.

== Notable inhabitants ==
- Oladele Rufus Adekanye
- Babajide Sanwo-Olu
- Ibiyemi Olatunji-Bello
- Justice G.B.A Coker
- F.C.O Coker
- Lanre Towry-Coker
- Tiwa Savage

== Places in Lagos Island ==
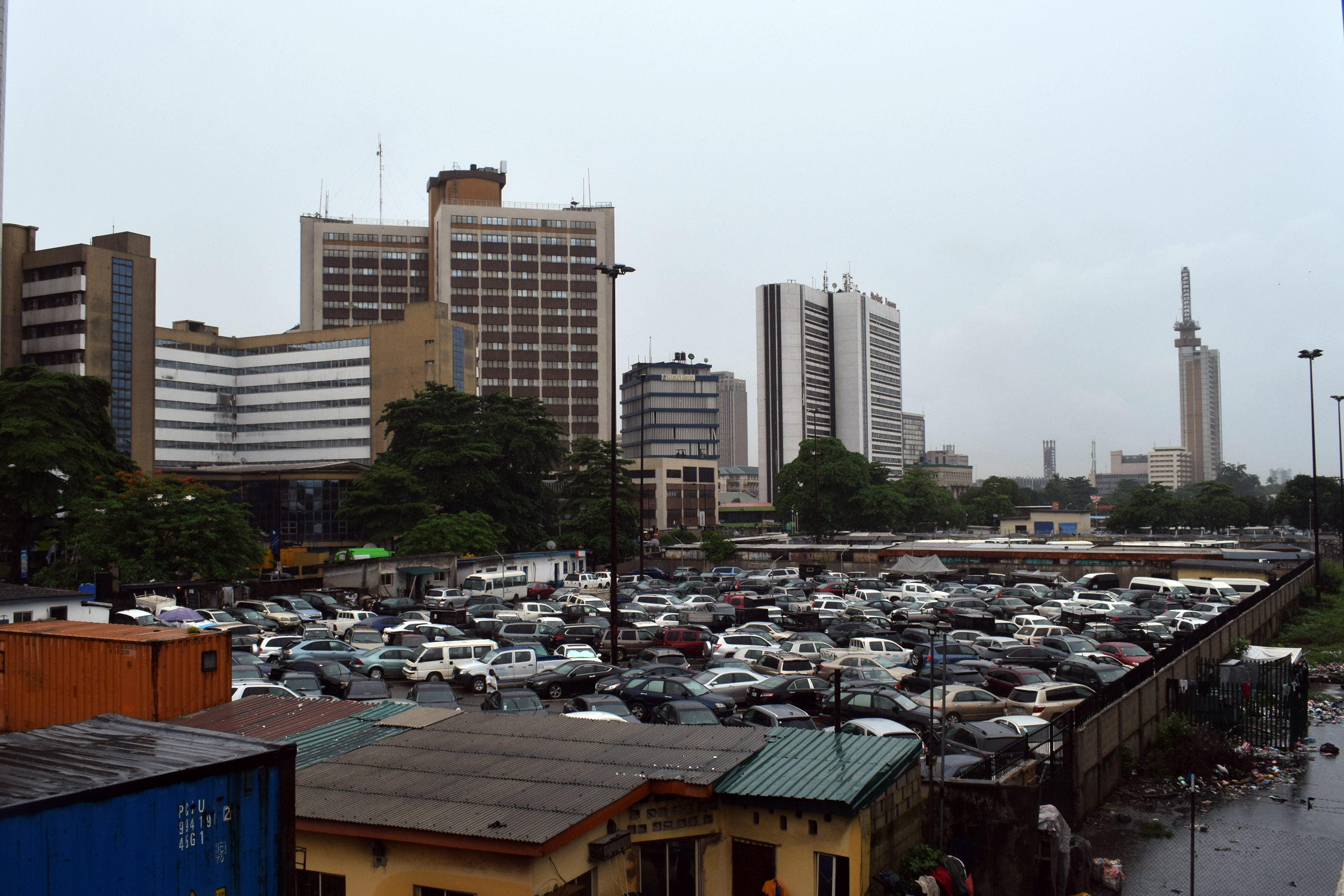
Aerial view of CMS, Lagos Island East, Lagos-Nigeria

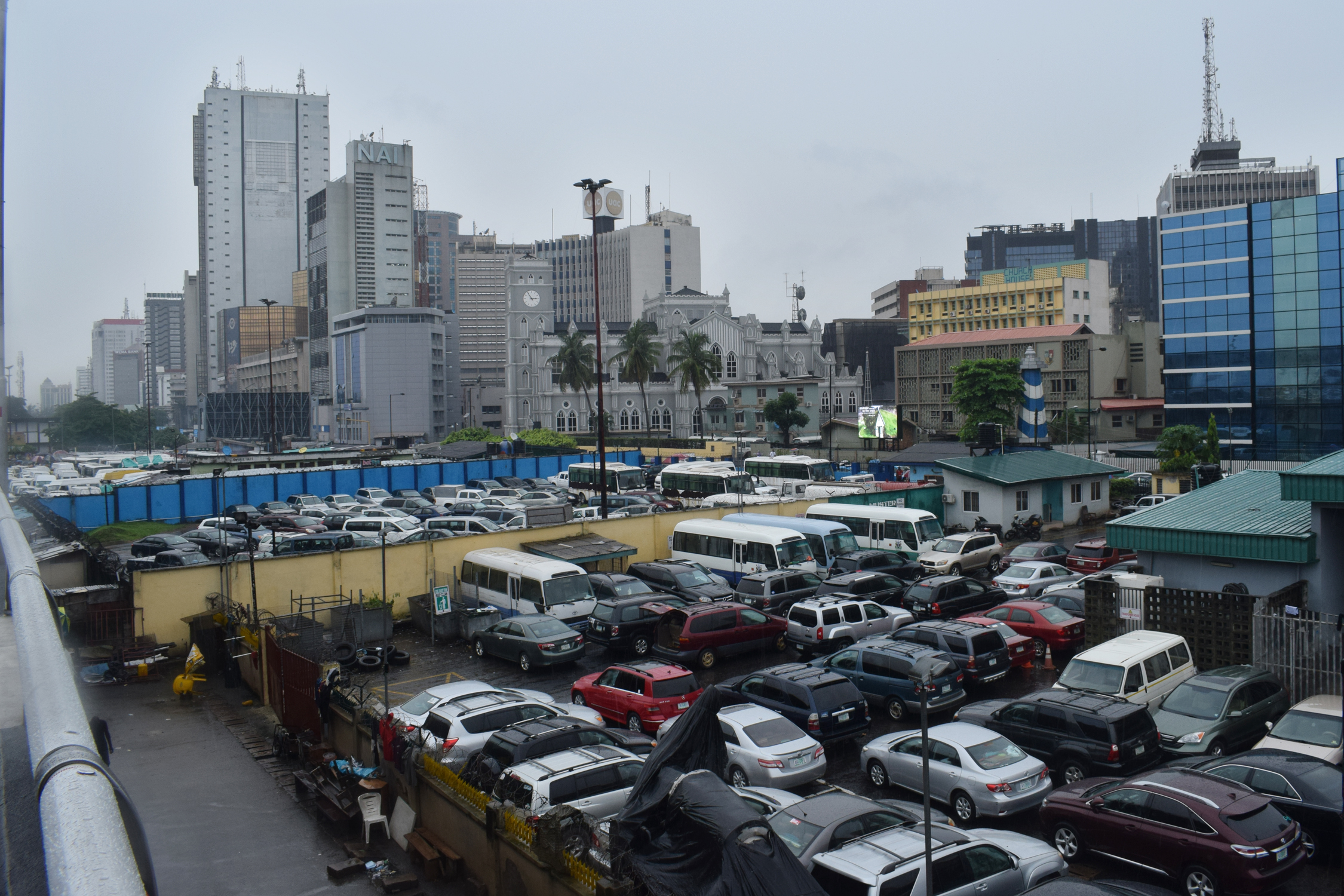
Aerial view of Marina, Lagos Island East, Lagos-Nigeria

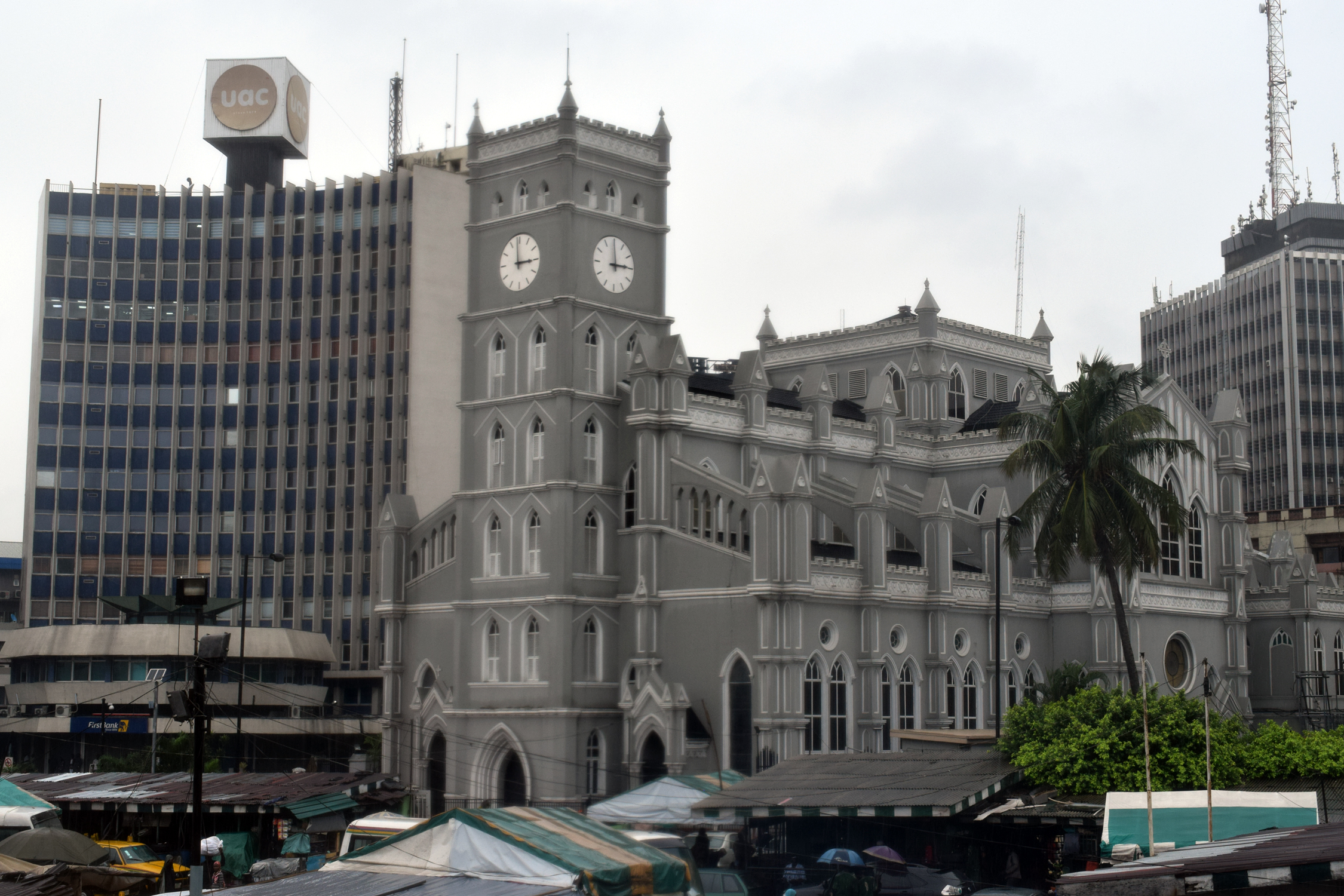
Cathedral Church CMS, Lagos Island East, Lagos-Nigeria

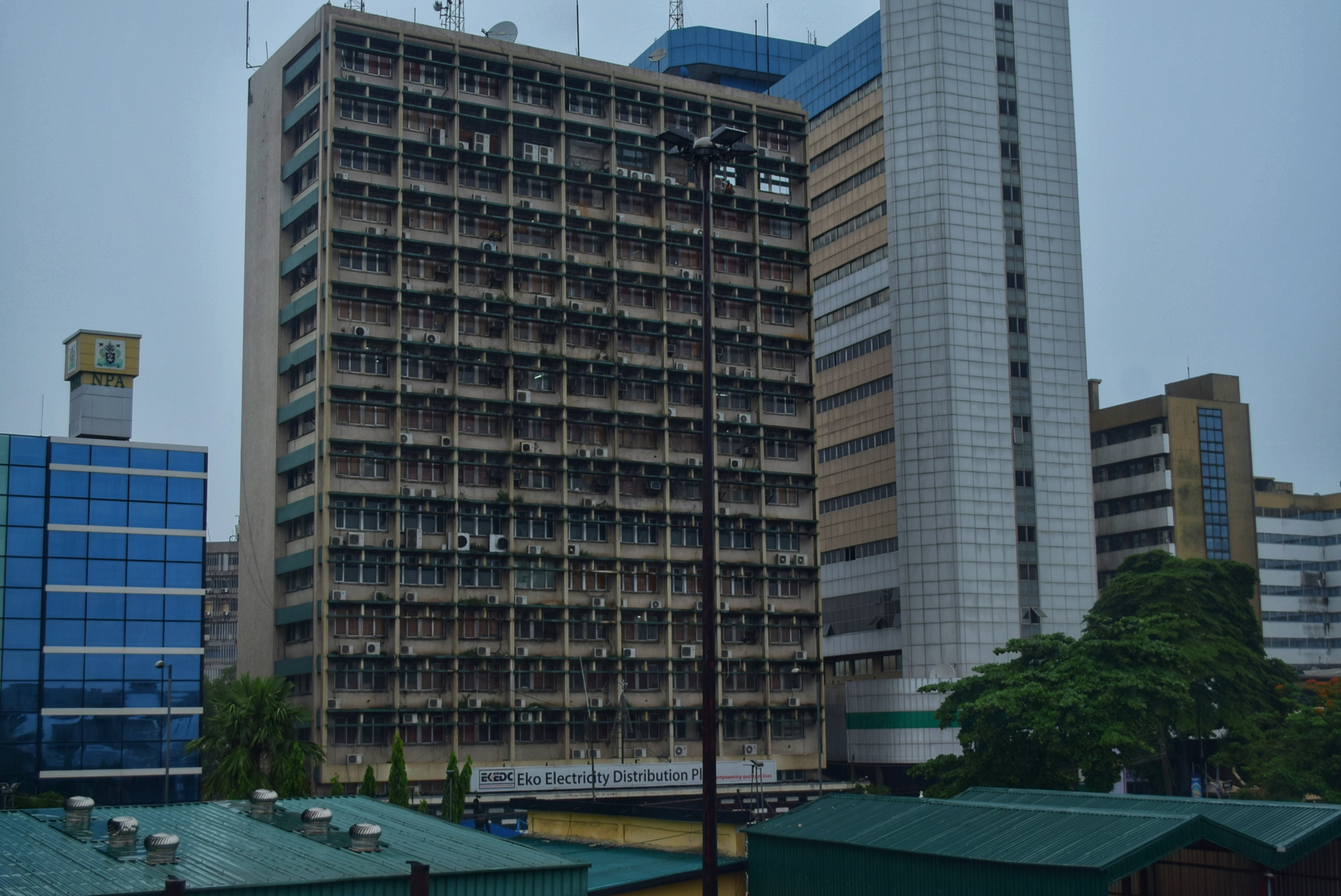
Eko Electricity Distribution Company, Marina, Lagos Island

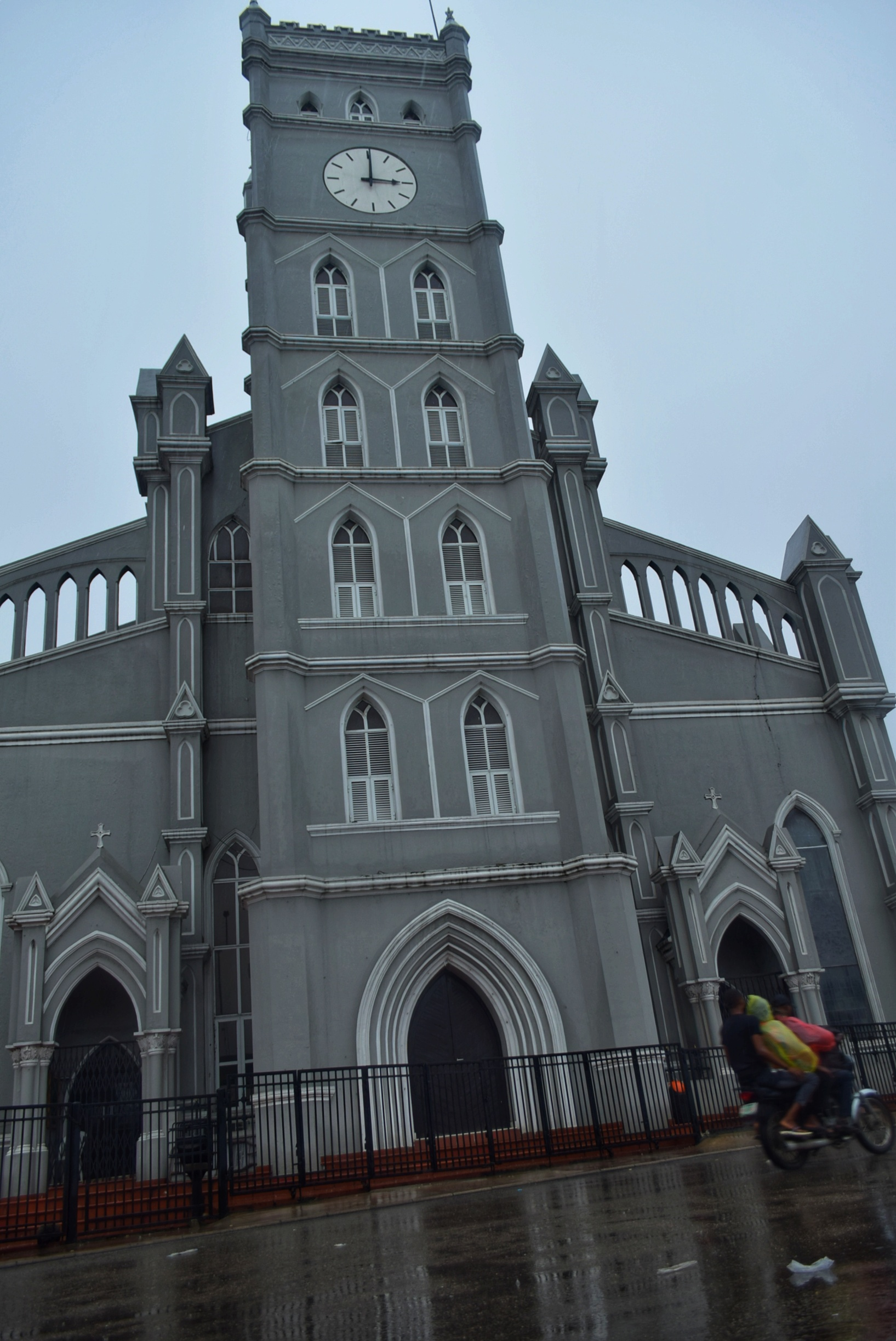
Lagos Cathedral, Marina, Lagos Island

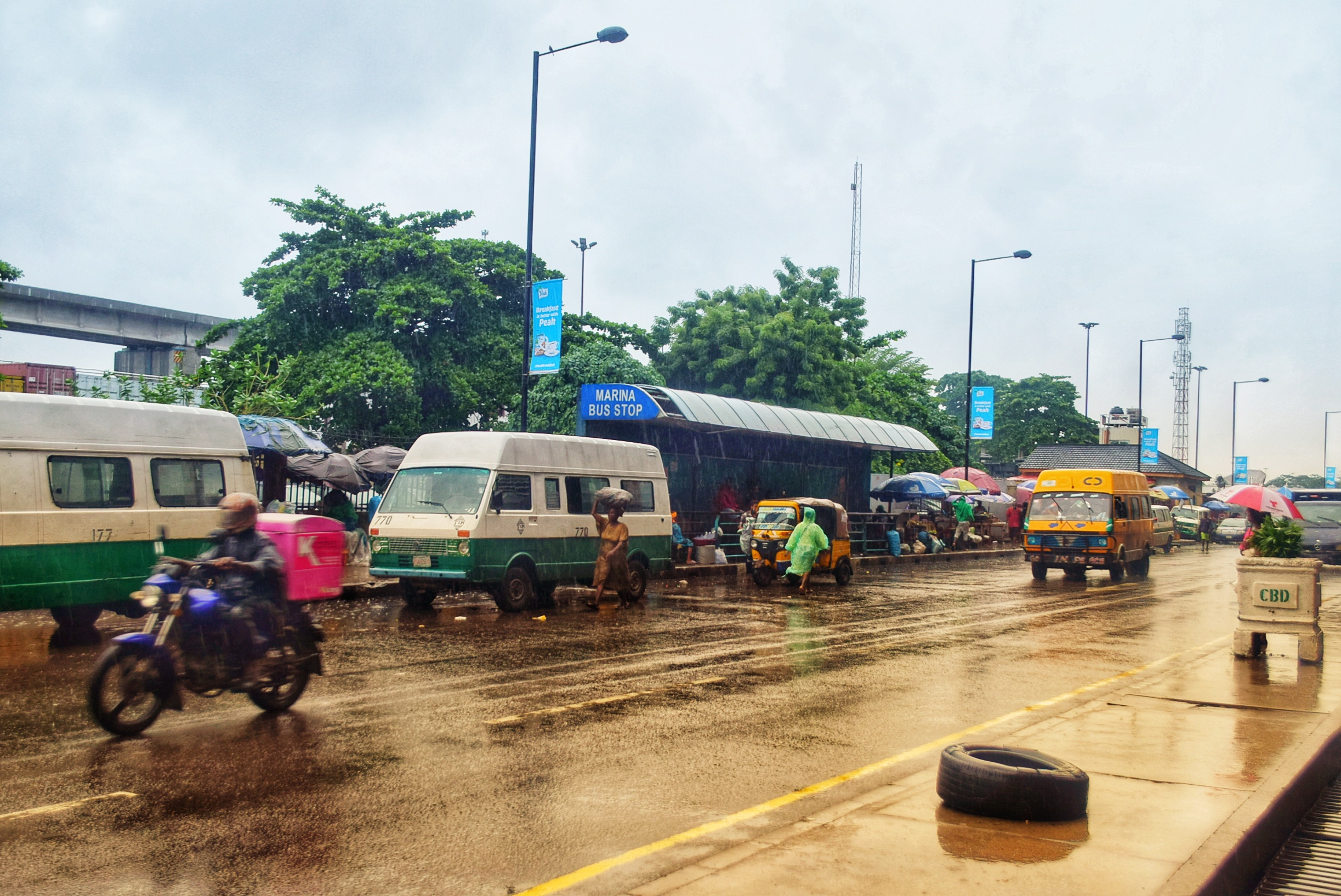
Marina Bus Stop, Lagos Island

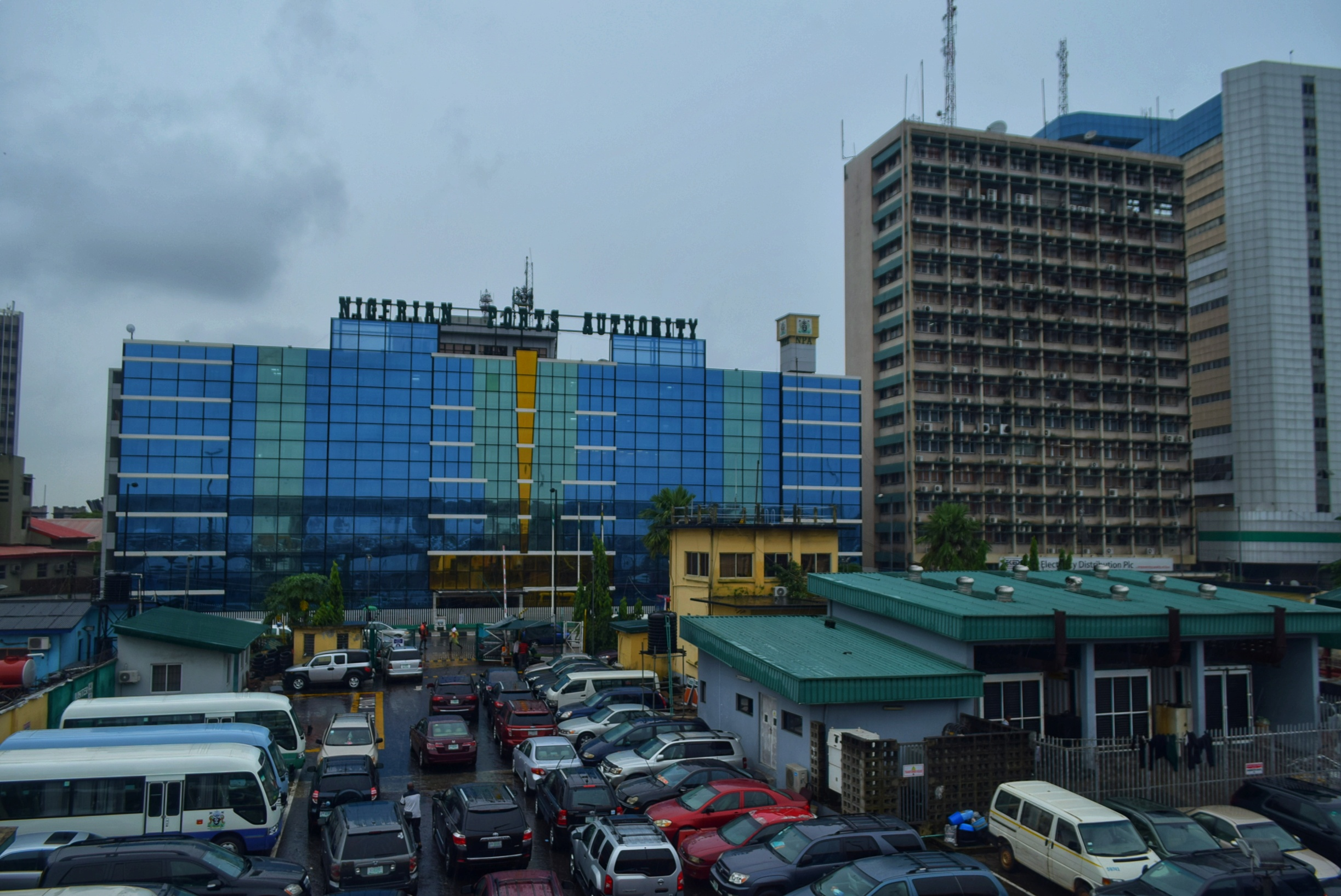
Nigerian Ports Authority, Marina, Lagos Island

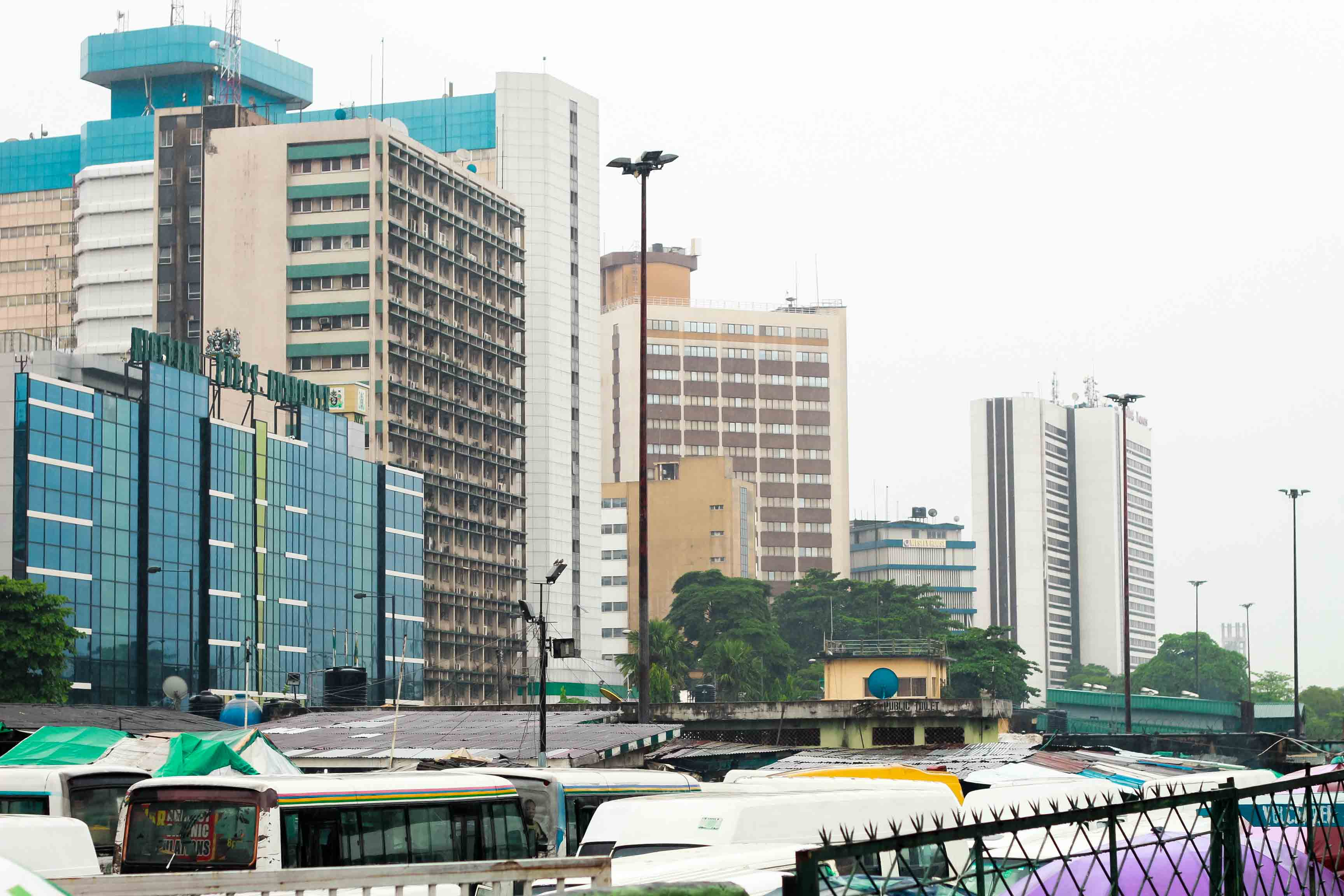
CMS Lagos

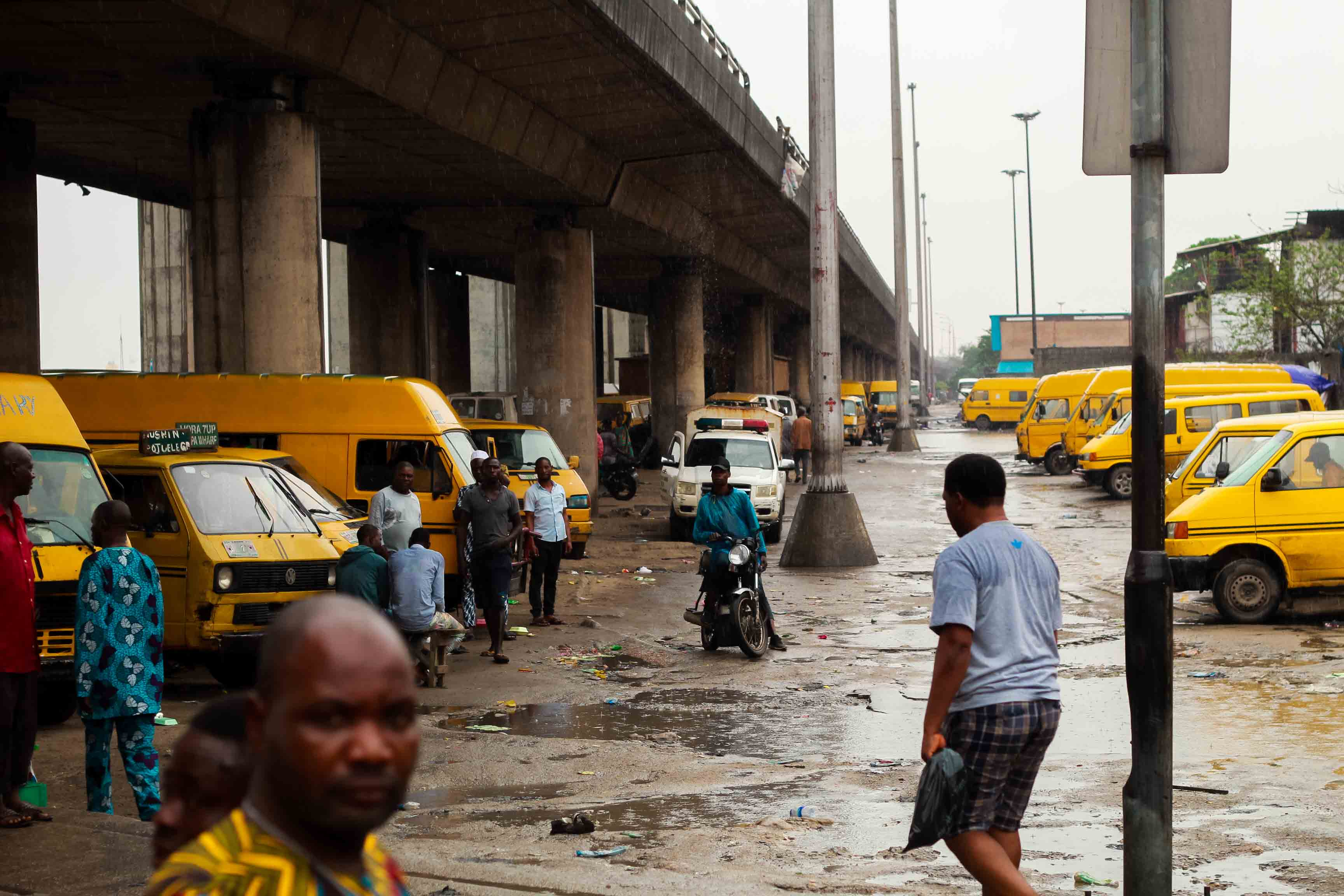
CMS Motor Park

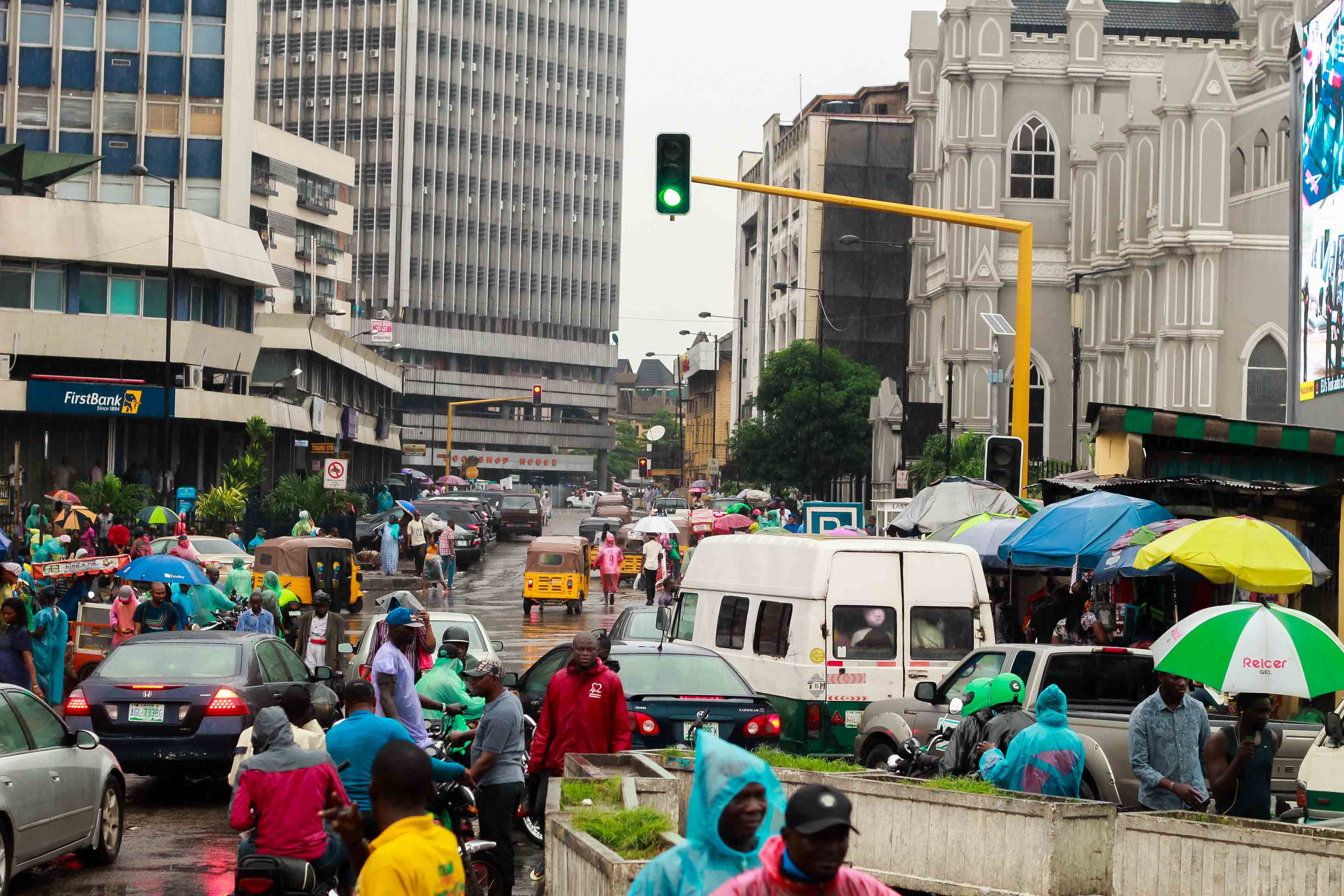
CMS road

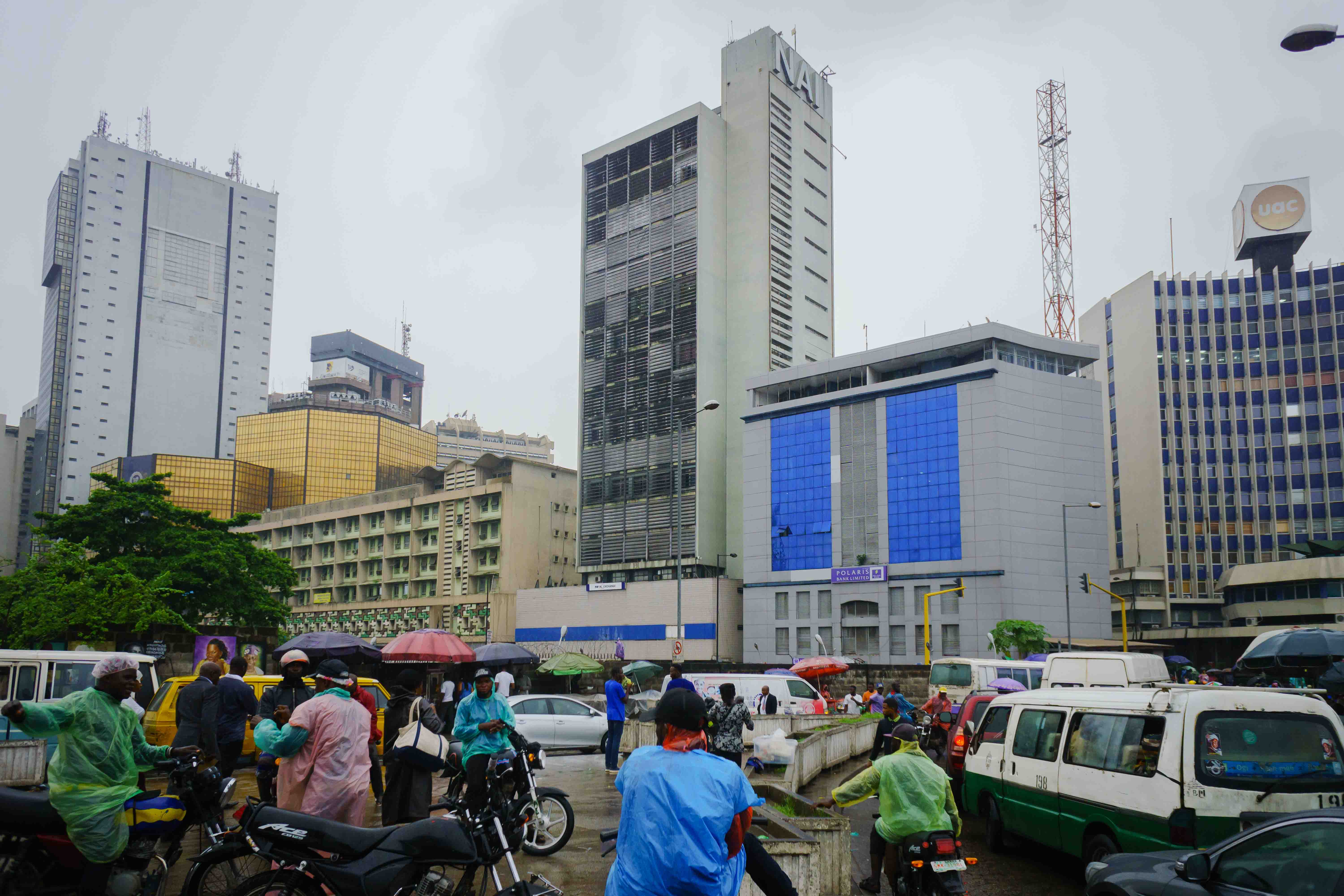
CMS route to Marina, Lagos

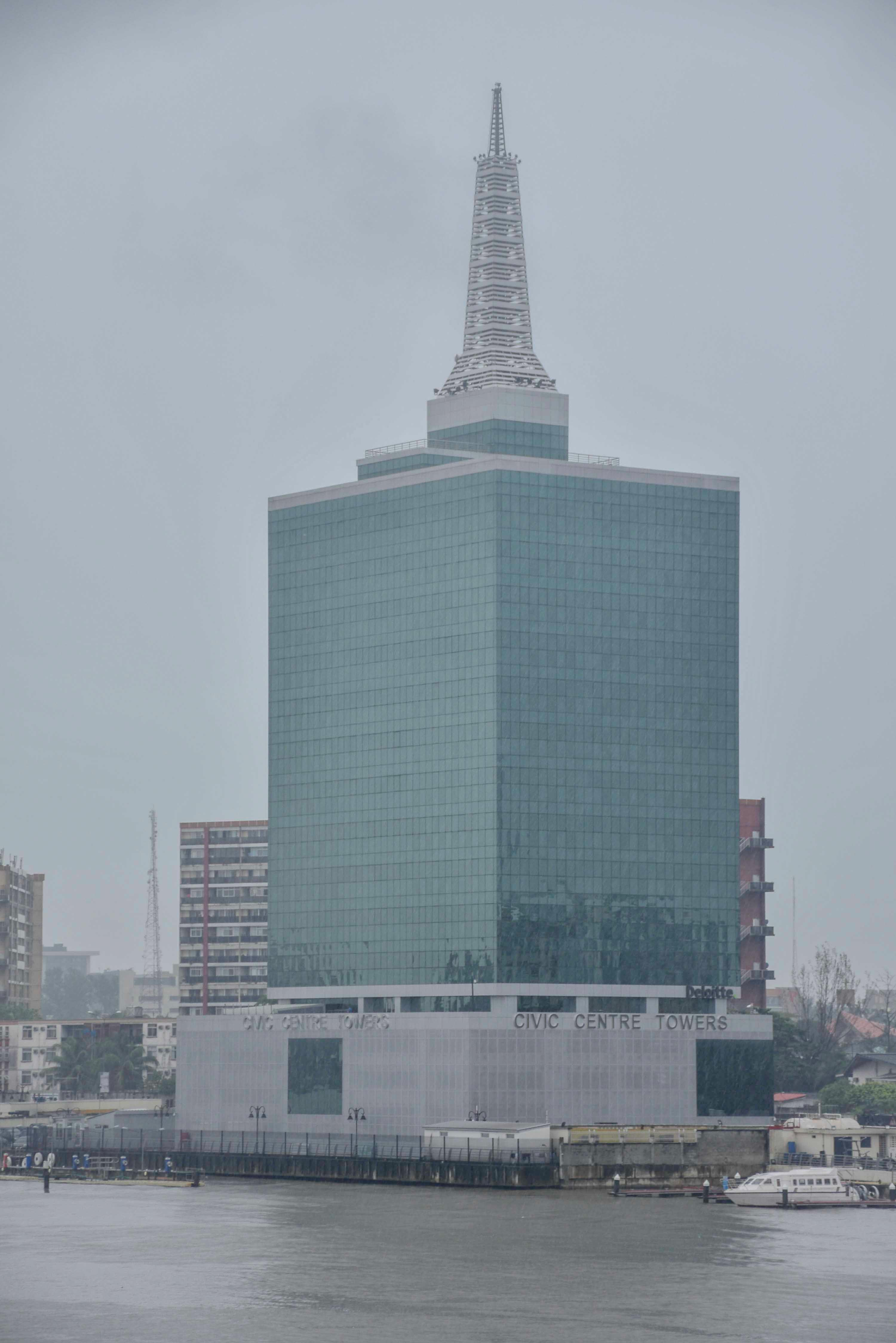
Civic Towers

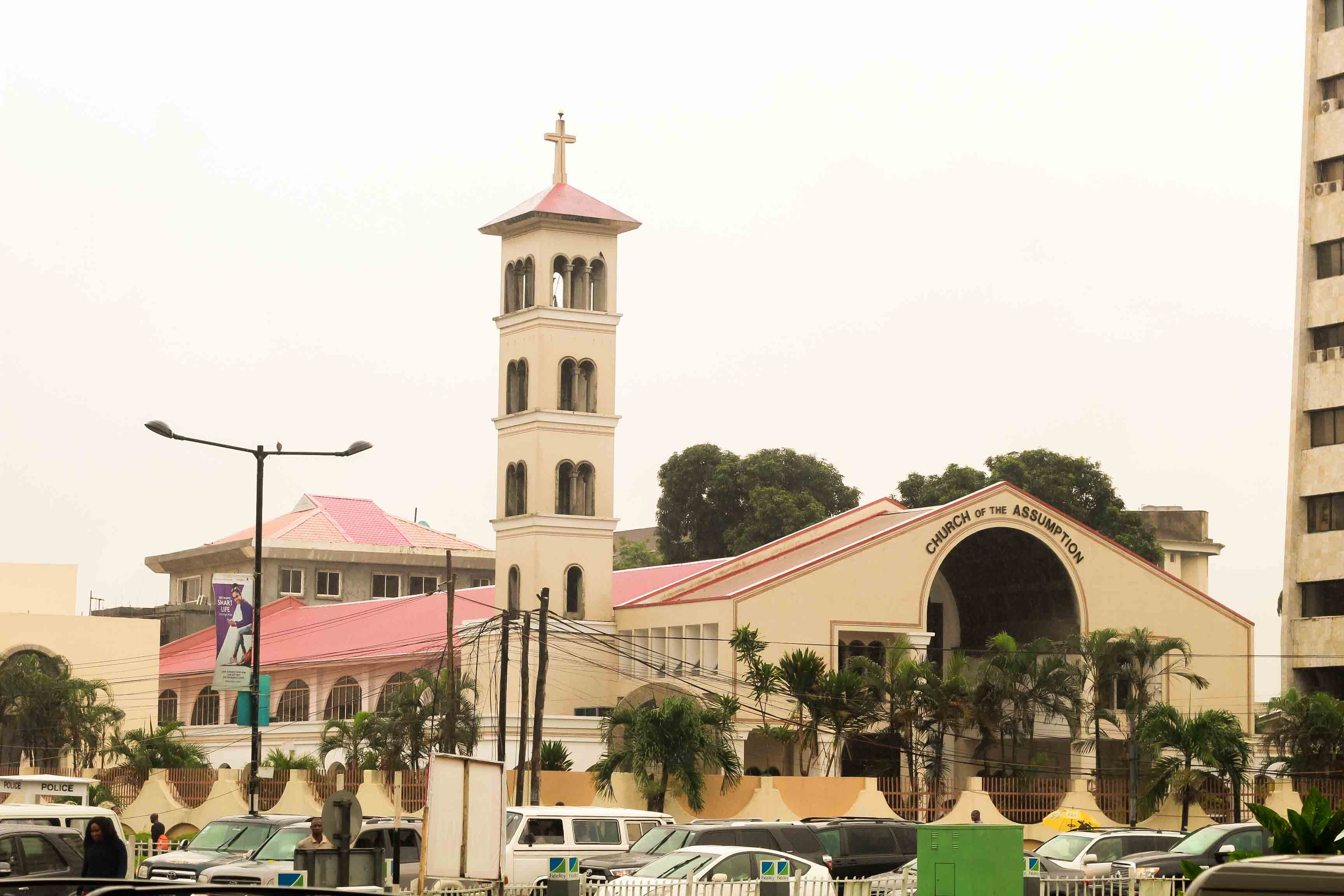
Church of the Assumption, Lagos

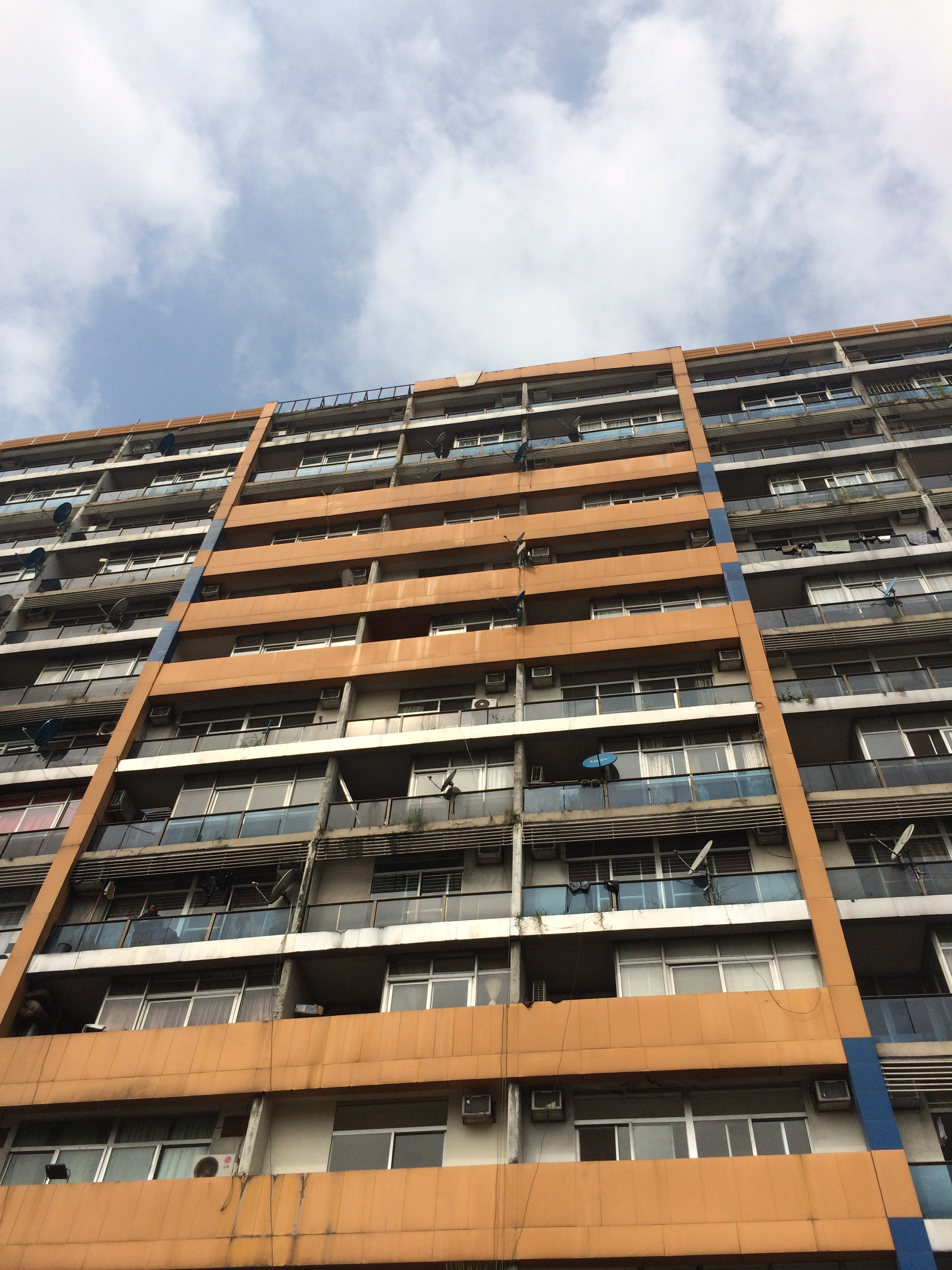
1004 Building, Lekki Road, Lagos

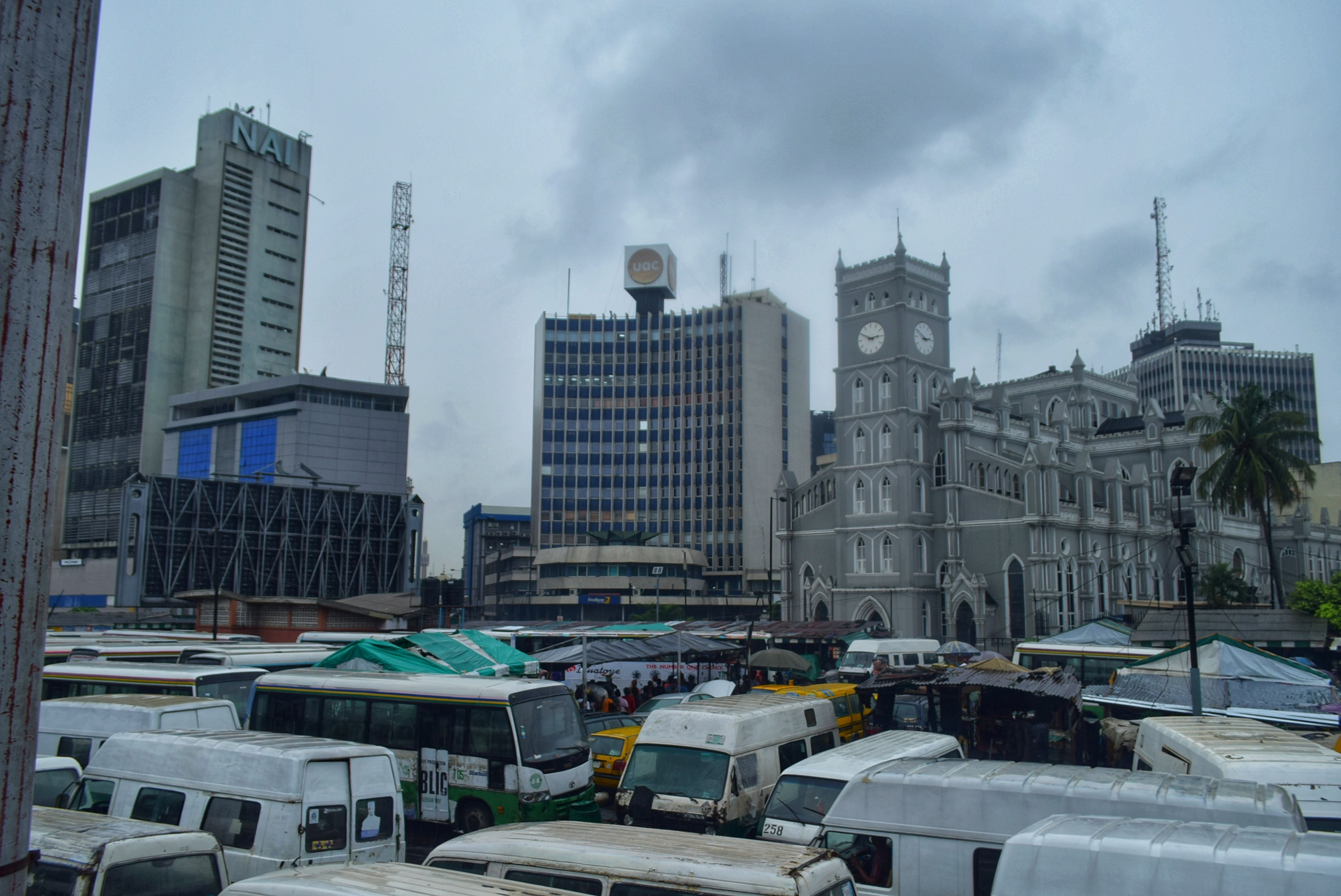

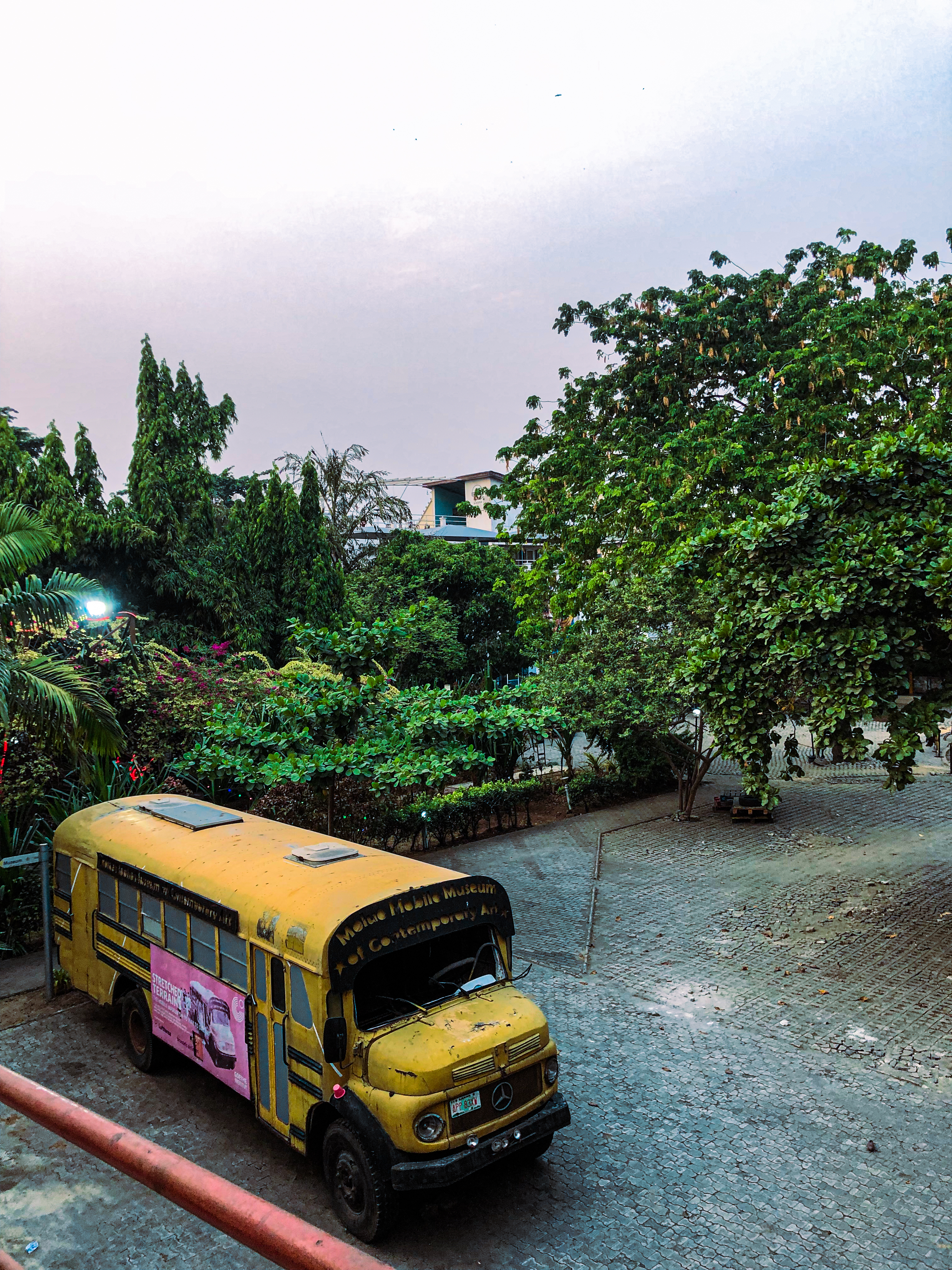
Freedom Park

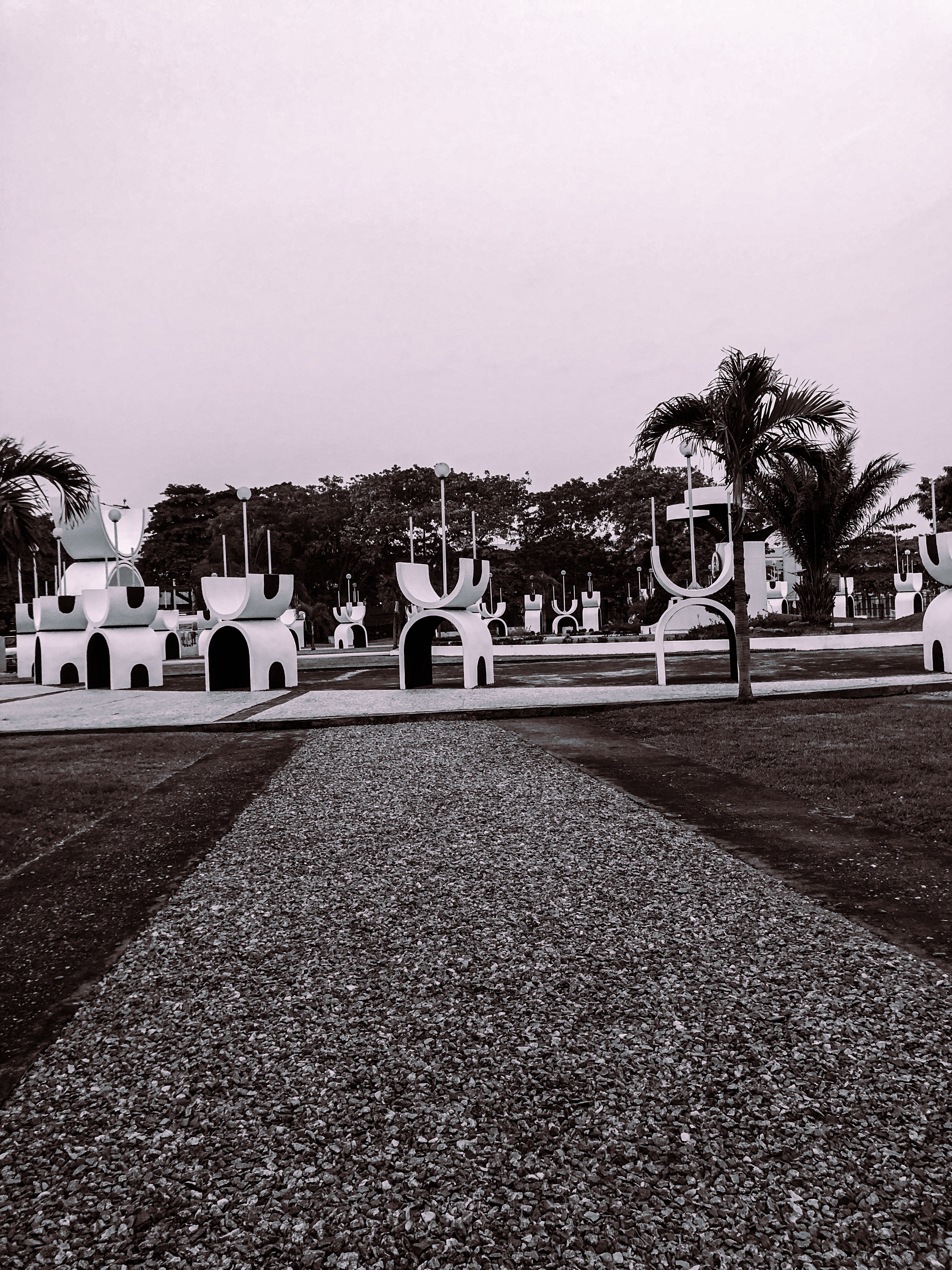
Remembrance Arcade, Lagos Island

== See also ==
- List of islands by population density
