= Kanye East =

Parliamentary constituency in the Southern District of Botswana, 2024 onwards

- Single-member constituency for the National Assembly of Botswana
- District: Southern
- Population: 42,236
- Major settlements: Kanye
- Area: 1,148 km^{2}

Current constituency
- Created: 2024
- Party: UDC
- Created from: Kanye North
- MP: Galenawabo Lekau
- Margin of victory: 3,488 (19.2 pp)

Kanye East is a constituency of the National Assembly of Botswana in the Southern District represented by Mogorosi Mosanana of the UDC. Further to the completion of the 2022 Delimitation of Parliamentary constituencies, the seat was first contested at the 2024 general election.

== Constituency profile ==
The constituency, predominantly rural and anchored around parts of Kanye encompasses the following localities:

1. Eastern part of Kanye
2. Lotlhakane
3. Moshaneng
4. Molapowabojang

== Members of Parliament ==
Key: UDC

Election	Winner
2024 election	Mogorosi Mosanana

== Election results ==
=== 2024 election ===
General election 2024: Kanye East
Party	Candidate	Votes	%
UDC	Mogorosi Mosanana	10,833	59.59
BDP	Thapelo Letsholo	7,345	40.41
Margin of victory		3,488	19.18
Total valid votes		18,178	99.16
Rejected ballots		154	0.84
Turnout		18,332	78.10
Registered electors		23,473	
UDC notional gain from BDP			
