= Thapelo Letsholo (cricketer) =

South African cricketer (born 1992)

Personal information
- Born: 28 February 1992 (age 34); Krugersdorp, South Africa
- Source: Cricinfo, 6 December 2020

Thapelo Letsholo (born 28 February 1992) is a South African cricketer. He played in seven first-class and two List A matches for Border from 2015 to 2017.

== See also ==
- List of Border representative cricketers
