= Lemogang Kwape =

Botswanan politician

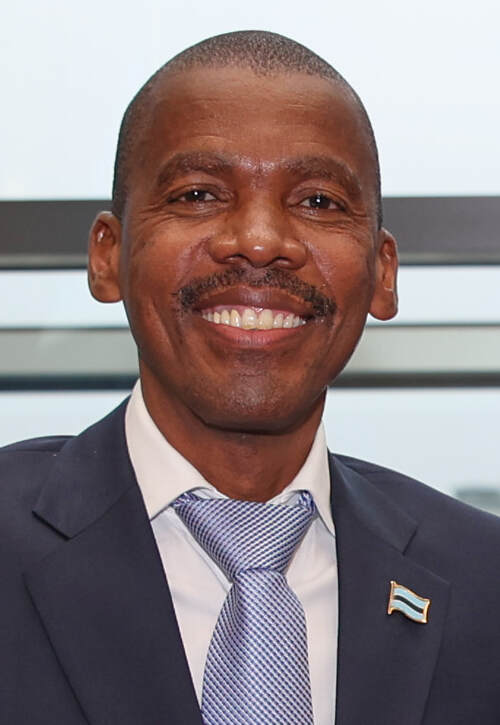
Lemogang Kwape

Lemogang Kwape is a Botswana politician, who served as Minister of Foreign Affairs in Botswana from 2020 to 2024, in the Government of Mokgweetsi Masisi. He was also MP for Kanye South.

== Ministerial roles ==
- Minister of Health and Wellness (until 2020)
- Minister of International Affairs and Cooperation (2020-2024)
