= Ajeromi-Ifelodun =

Coordinates: 6.4448°N 3.3339°E

- LGA
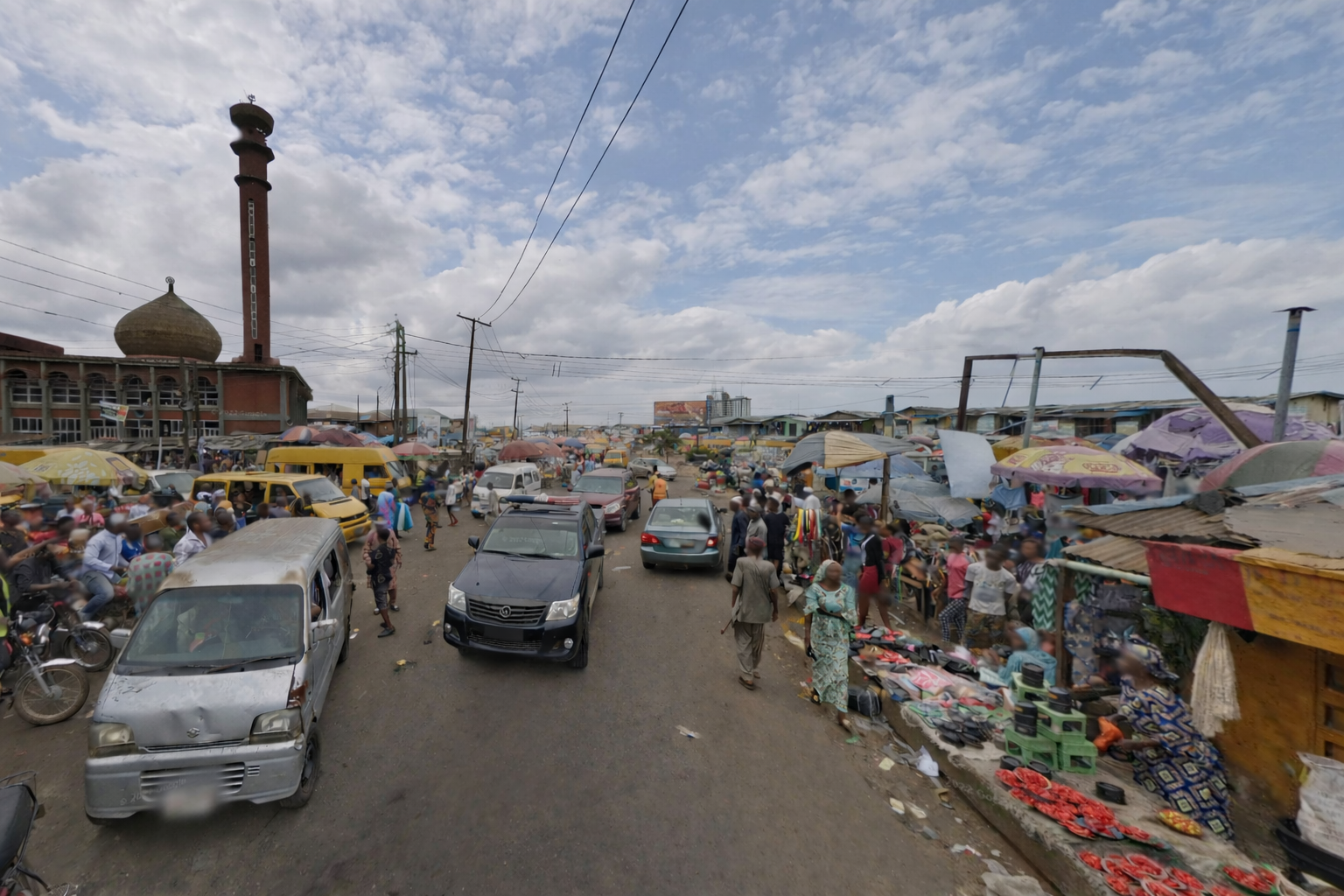
- Boundary Roundabout and the Ajegunle Central Mosque

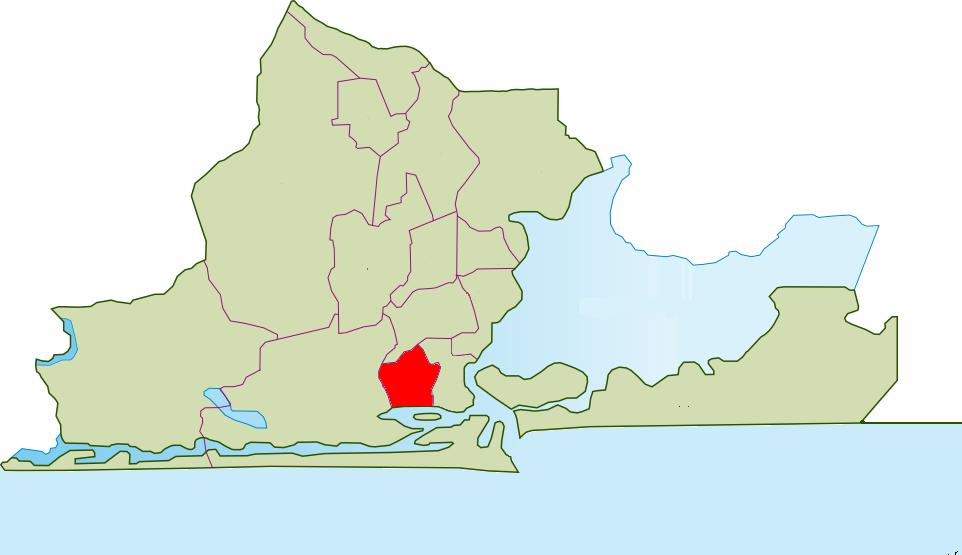
- Location within Lagos Metropolitan Area
- Interactive map of Ajeromi-Ifelodun
- Country: Nigeria
- State: Lagos State
- Headquarter: Ajegunle

Government
  - The Executive Chairman and the Head of the Local Government Council: Hon. Olalekan Olu Akindipe (2025 - Date)

Area
  - Total: 12.49 km^{2} (4.82 sq mi)

Population (2022)
  - Total: 1,017,500
  - Density: 81,470/km^{2} (211,000/sq mi)
- Time zone: UTC+1 (WAT)

Ajeromi-Ifelodun is a major Local Government Area in Badagry Division, Lagos State. It is famously known for encompassing the vibrant and culturally influential district of Ajegunle. and has some 80,000 inhabitants per square kilometre. Despite its small landmass, it is one of the most densely populated urban areas in Africa and serves as a diverse melting pot for ethnic groups from across the country. The area is located directly to the west of Apapa and to the east of Satellite Town, Lagos.

Ajeromi-Ifelodun accommodates various ethnic groups, with the Yoruba tribe prevailing. The predominant religions are Christianity and Islam, and the commonly spoken languages are Yoruba language and English. The district is located directly west of Apapa and east of Satellite Town, Lagos. The region is internationally recognized as a massive talent hub, having produced many of Nigeria’s most iconic professional footballers and musicians. Economically, it thrives as a commercial center driven by bustling markets and its proximity to the Lagos Port Complex and Tin Can Island Port.

== Overview ==
Ajeromi-Ifelodun is characterized by a high-density, compact urban layout, covering approximately 12.49 km^{2} (4.82 mi^{2}) of predominantly reclaimed marshland in the Badagry Division of Lagos, Nigeria. The area is bounded to the north by Surulere, to the east by the Apapa industrial corridor, and to the south by the Atlantic Ocean and the Tin Can Island Port complex. Its spatial orientation is heavily influenced by its proximity to these major maritime and industrial hubs, which has historically driven rapid, often unplanned urbanization and led to a grid-like but congested network of narrow streets and drainage canals.

The administrative and residential structure of the LGA is divided into several prominent neighborhoods, most notably the Ajegunle district, which serves as its commercial and cultural heart. Other major localities include Olodi-Apapa, Tolu, Wilmer, and Boundary which functions as a primary transit and trading node between the LGA and its neighbors. Despite challenges with flooding and inadequate infrastructure due to its low-lying topography, the neighborhood remains a strategic economic corridor, with its layout dominated by large markets like the Boundary and Odunade markets that serve as regional hubs for retail and wholesale trade.

The southern part of the neighborhood contains a number of large industrial and maritime facilities. Many of which serve as an extension of the Tin Can Island Port facility. Africa Terminals Nigeria Limited has a large fuel storage depot adjacent to the water and the Oshodi–Apapa Expressway. There is a large and planned industrial estate located to the north of the Lagos–Badagry Expressway. The bulk of the residential districts in Ajeromi-Ifelodun are located north of the Oshodi–Apapa Expressway and south of the Lagos–Badagry Expressway. Boundary Roundabout is a central public space and junction located next to Boundary Market.

== History ==
Ajeromi-Ifelodun was formally established as a Local Government Area on October 1, 1976, following the nationwide local government reforms aimed at decentralizing administration in Nigeria. The name itself is a portmanteau of two distinct communities, "Ajeromi" and "Ifelodun," reflecting the amalgamation of diverse settlers who moved to the region during the mid-20th century expansion of Lagos. Originally part of the old Ojo Local Government Area, it was eventually carved out to provide more focused governance for the rapidly growing population centered around the Ajegunle axis.

The historical growth of the area is inextricably linked to the development of Apapa, the Lagos Port Complex, and Tin Can Island Port in the 1970s, which transformed the once-marshy outskirts into a massive residential hub for port workers and migrants from across Nigeria. Over the decades, the neighborhood of Ajegunle within the LGA evolved into a renowned cultural laboratory, birthing the Galala (dance) and Swo music genres and serving as a grassroots academy for some of Nigeria's most celebrated international footballers. This reputation for social mobility and raw talent has earned the area the historical moniker "The Land of Opportunities," despite the systemic infrastructural challenges it has faced throughout its development.

== Infrastructure ==
The transportation network of Ajeromi-Ifelodun is a multimodal system primarily defined by its extreme density and its strategic location between the Lagos mainland and the Atlantic seaports. The area is well served by major retail roadways, including the Lagos–Badagry Expressway and Oshodi–Apapa Expressway. Road transport serves as the backbone of the LGA, with a network of arteries that facilitate the movement of goods and commuters toward Apapa and the Lagos Port Complex. Major transit nodes like the Boundary Junction act as critical inter-regional hubs, although the high vehicular density—estimated at significantly higher than the national average—often results in severe traffic congestion and rapid deterioration of road surfaces.

In recent years, the infrastructure has seen a shift toward intermodal integration to alleviate road pressure. While the informal "danfo" buses and tricycles (keke marwa) remain dominant for local movement, the proximity of the Blue Line (Lagos Transit) has begun to influence transit patterns in the broader region. The area is served by the Suru Alaba, Iganmu, and Mile 2 stations of the Blue Line (Lagos Transit). Given that the LGA is surrounded by lagoons and creeks, water transportation via jetties like the Wilmer and Ajegunle waterfronts offers a viable alternative for bypasses to Lagos Island and Apapa, though these inland waterways remain relatively underutilized compared to their capacity.

== Climate ==
Ajeromi Ifelodun experiences an average temperature of 27 degrees Celsius (80 degrees Fahrenheit), accompanied by an estimated humidity of 88 percent. The primary seasons include the dry season and the rainy season, the latter marked by intermittent heavy showers.

Ajegunle has a cloudy wet season, a partly cloudy dry season, and consistently hot and oppressive weather throughout the year. Temperatures typically range from 75 °F to 91 °F, seldom dropping below 70 °F or exceeding 94 °F.

The period with high temperatures spans 4.7 months, running from December 6 to April 29, where the daily high averages above 89 °F. March stands out as the hottest month, with an average high of 91 °F and a low of 79 °F.

Conversely, the cooler season extends for 3.0 months, starting from June 26 to September 28, featuring daily highs averaging below 84 °F. August emerges as the coldest month, with an average low of 75 °F and a high of 82 °F.

== Economy ==
Ajeromi Ifelodun Local Government Area has trade as its major economic activity with markets such as the Boundary Market, the Wilmer Market, and the Odunade Market providing an avenue for the exchange of a variety of goods and services in the area.

== Neighborhoods ==
Towns, Areas under Ajeromi Ifelodun Local Government Area:

- Ashafa
- Awodi
- Ajegunle
- Aiyetoro Ajeromi
- Araromi Ajeromi
- Cardoso
- Orodu
- Temidire
- Onibaba
- Layeni
- Tolu
- Amukoko
- Suru-Alaba
- Olodi
