= Apapa–Oworonshoki Expressway =

Expressway in Lagos, Nigeria

Apapa–Oworonshoki Expressway is a major expressway connecting Apapa to Somolu via Surulere and Mushin in Lagos. For most of its portion, it is a six-lane expressway with two one-way service roads parallel to the expressway. The expressway crosses other major expressways such as Lagos-Badagry Expressway and Ikorodu Road. It also passes Tin Can Island, and its starting point borders the Port of Lagos. The expressway will host some of LAMATA's BRT stops. President Muhammadu Buhari in November 2018 releases N73 billion to work on the road and address the issue of gridlock on the road.
