= Ifedayo Oladapo =

Oladapo Ifedayo Olawole
- Born: 24 November 1932; Ondo City, Nigeria
- Died: 6 March 2010 (aged 77)
- Education: University of Ibadan, University of Cambridge, University of St. Andrews
- Known for: Structural concrete
- Scientific career
- Fields: Civil engineering
- Workplaces: Ahmadu Bello University, Ondo State University, University of Lagos

Ifedayo Olawole Oladapo (24 November 1932 – 6 March 2010) was a Nigerian academic and professor of Civil Engineering at the University of Lagos.

== Early life ==
Ifedayo was born in Ondo City and had his early education at Government College, Ibadan. He attended the University College Ibadan in 1954 and graduated with honors and afterwards earned a B.Sc. in civil engineering from the University of St. Andrews, graduating with First Class honours in 1959. He earned a Ph.D. in structural engineering from the University of Cambridge in 1962.

== Career ==
He joined the former Ostenfeld and Jonson now Cowi Consult and gained practical experience as a design engineer. After returning to Nigeria in 1963 to start an academic career, he was active in the design and construction of many concrete structures in Lagos, including the concrete shell roof, Eko Bridge, and Third Mainland Bridge. He also played key roles in the construction of the Benue River Bridge and Niger Bridge in Onitsha. In 1982, he became the first Vice-Chancellor of the Ondo State University, holding the position for a period of eight years, after which he commenced work at Ahmadu Bello University, Zaria as lecturer in the department of Civil Engineering between 1963 and 1964, before moving over to University of Lagos. At University of Lagos, he became a Senior Lecturer and subsequently Associate Professor in 1970, Dean of Engineering Faculty. In 1971, he served as the deputy vice-chancellor of the university between 1977 and 1979. During this period, he designed the first set of 32 buildings which were constructed on the university campus during a period of austerity and worldwide economic recession. He has been recognised for his significant contributions to knowledge in his area of specialisation, namely structural concrete. His early research work in this field dealt with the properties of prestressed concrete at different rates of loading. His research work focused on determination of the properties of concrete, the movement –curvature relationships and the ultimate loads of concrete structures. This led him to the formulation of the plastic design theory for reinforced concrete structures which eventually resulted in the "limits state design method for structural concrete". These academic achievements resulted in being invited to participate in the design and construction of some major concretes structures in the country including the Eko Bridge, Third Mainland Bridge. He also made significant contribution to different aspects of the building code which was launched in Nigeria in 1970. His proposal for modification (replacement of the British code way of practice) were accepted by the standards organisation of Nigeria and formed the basis of the first "Nigeria Code of practice for structural concrete in Nigeria". which was published in 1973.

== Education and academic posts ==
He was Visiting Professor, University of Aalborg, Denmark, the University of Illinois, Urbana, USA, in 1967 and a Commonwealth Visiting Professor to the University of Leeds, England in 1980/81. He has served in the executive council of the International Association for Bridge and Structural Engineering (IABSE) based in Zurich. He was the first Nigerian engineer to be awarded the National merit Award.

- 1954: University of Ibadan
- 1959: B.Sc., Civil Engineering, University of St. Andrews
- 1962: Ph.D., Structural Engineering, Christ College Cambridge
- 1963–1964: Lecturer at Ahmadu Bello University
- 1971–1975: Dean of the Faculty of Engineering, University of Lagos
- 1977–1979: Deputy Vice Cancellor of the University of Lagos
- 1971–1997: Vice-President of International Association for Bridge and Structured Engineering, Zurich
- 1987–1988; President of Nigerian Academy of Science
- 1995; First President of Nigeria Academy of Engineering
- 1987–1989: Chairman, Committee of vice-chancellors of Nigerian State Universities;
- 1994–1998: President of the Council of Registered Engineers of Nigeria (COREN).
- Consultant to UNESCO on Engineering Education.

== Honours ==
- Induction into the Hall of Fame for Science and Technology in New York "for Outstanding contribution in the field of Engineering"
- Fellow of the Institute of Civil Engineers of London
- Officer of the Order of Niger
