= Abubakar Dantsoho =

Nigerian maritime administrator (born 1969)

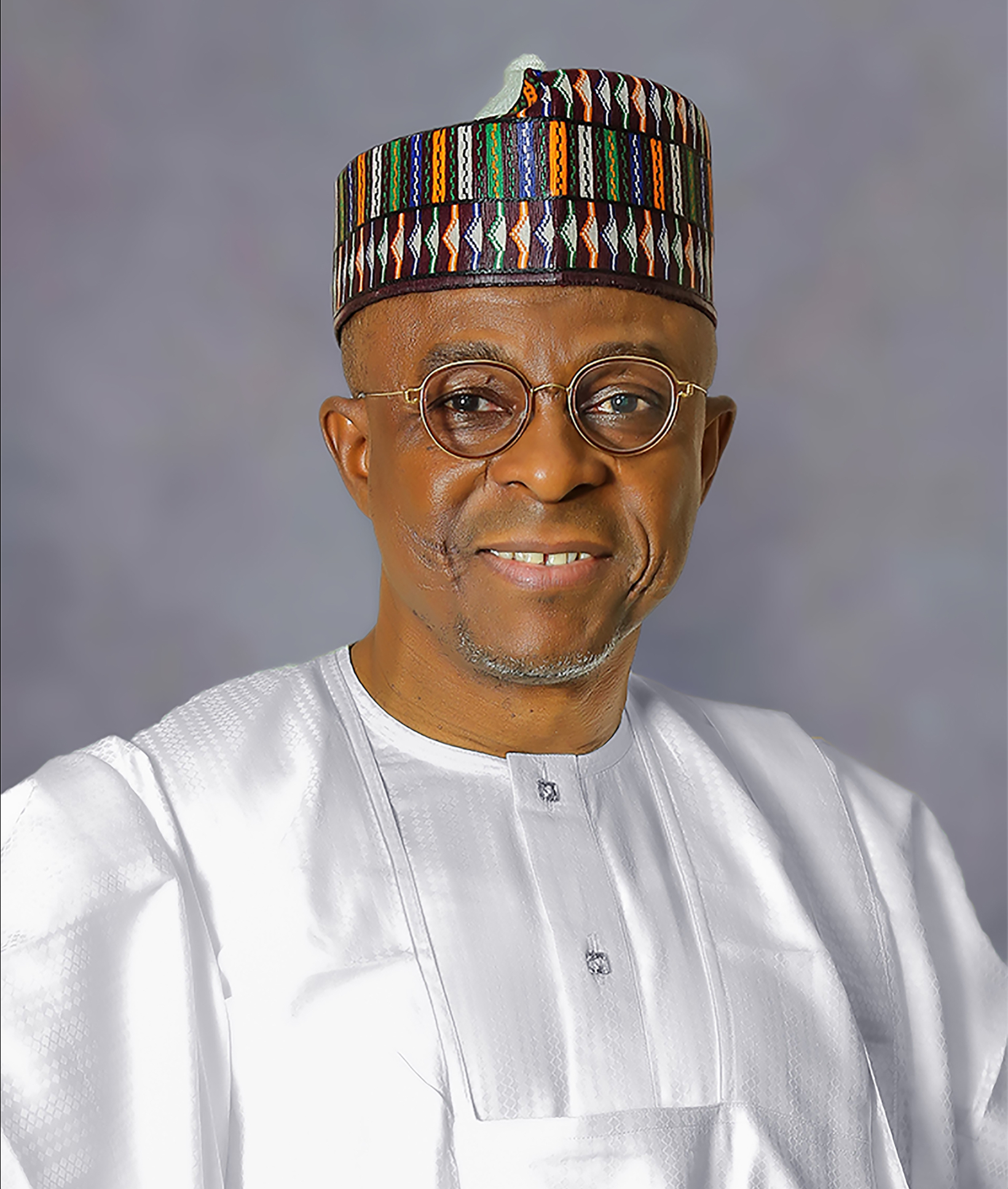

29th [[Managing Director of the Nigerian Ports Authority]]
- Incumbent
- Assumed office 12 July 2024
- Appointed by: Bola Tinubu
- President: Bola Tinubu
- Preceded by: Mohammed Bello-Koko

Personal details
- Born: 26th March, 1969
- Education: University of Maiduguri. Cardiff University. Liverpool John Moores University

Abubakar Dantsoho (born 26 March 1969) is a Nigerian maritime administrator and public sector executive. He serves as the 29th Managing Director of the Nigerian Ports Authority (NPA), having been appointed on 12 July 2024 by the President of the Federal Republic of Nigeria, President Bola Ahmed Tinubu.

== Early life and personal background ==
Abubakar Dantsoho was born on 26 March 1969 and hails from Jalingo Local Government Area, Taraba State, Nigeria. He is married and has children.

== Education ==
Dantsoho obtained a Bachelor of Science (B.Sc. Hons) degree in Public Administration from the University of Maiduguri, Nigeria, in 1992. He subsequently earned a Master of Science (M.Sc.) degree in International Transport from Cardiff University, Wales, United Kingdom, in 1999, where his research focused on port privatization.

He later completed a Doctor of Philosophy (PhD) degree in Maritime Technology at Liverpool John Moores University, United Kingdom, in 2015. His doctoral research examined risk-based safety management frameworks for marine-based tank farm operations.

== Career ==
Dantsoho joined the Nigerian Ports Authority (NPA) in 1992 during his National Youth Service Corps (NYSC) service and was subsequently retained as a Marketing Officer at the Authority's headquarters. Between 1993 and 2006, he served in a range of commercial and marketing roles across several port complexes and departments, including the Roll-on/Roll-off (RoRo) Port and Tin Can Island Port. During this period, he also undertook support assignments as Personal Assistant and Special Assistant to senior management officials within the Authority.

From 2006 to 2019, he moved through senior management positions within the NPA, holding roles including Assistant Manager, Manager, Senior Manager, and Principal Manager in the Commercial, Tariff, and Billing functions. He additionally served at various times as Technical Assistant to the Managing Director and held assignments at both the Authority's headquarters and operational port locations.

In 2020, Dantsoho was appointed Port Manager of the Onne Port Complex in Rivers State, where he was responsible for overseeing port operations and stakeholder coordination. He was later promoted to Assistant General Manager at the Nigerian Ports Authority (NPA) headquarters and subsequently served as Special Assistant to the Managing Director. Between 2022 and 2023, Dantsoho served as Chief of Staff to the Minister of Transportation. In this role, he was involved in administrative coordination, policy support, and representation of the Minister at official engagements.

On 12 July 2024, Dantsoho was appointed Managing Director of the Nigerian Ports Authority by President Bola Ahmed Tinubu, becoming the 29th person to hold the position.

== Recognition ==
In December 2025, Dantsoho received the Award of Excellence in Maritime Infrastructure Modernisation and Global Competitiveness at the Nigeria Excellence Awards in Public Service, a presidential initiative recognising exceptional service in public administration. In 2025, he was named Man of the Year by The Reporters Nigeria Magazine for his leadership in enhancing port efficiency and Nigeria's maritime profile. Dantsoho was elected Vice‑President for Africa of the International Association of Ports & Harbours (IAPH) in August 2025, highlighting his international recognition. He also became the first Nigerian to be elected Chairman of the Port Management Association of West & Central Africa (PMAWCA), further demonstrating his regional leadership in the maritime industry.
