= Oworonshoki =

Human settlement in Lagos State, Nigeria

Oworonshoki is a suburb of Lagos, Nigeria. The community is under the Kosofe Local Government Area of Lagos State. Geographically, Oworonshoki is pivotal to Lagos State as it connects the Mainland and Island areas of Lagos via the Third Mainland Bridge. It also hosts a terminus of the Apapa Oworonshoki Expressway.

Under Kosofe Local Government Area, Oworonshoki has two wards, Ward A and Ward B.

The present king of Oworonshoki is Oba Saliu Babatunde (Oloworo 2).
