= Taiwo Kolawole =

Nigerian politician (born 1961)

Honourable Taiwo Musbau Kolawole
- Born: 18 July 1961 (age 64); Lagos Island, Nigeria
- Occupation: Politician
- Successor: Kalejaiye Adeboye Paul
- Political party: All Progressives Congress (APC)

Taiwo Musbau Kolawole (born 18 July 1961) is a Nigerian politician, administrator and statistician elected as member of the Federal House of Representatives in the 9th Nigerian National Assembly representing Ajeromi/Ifelodun constituency since 2019. A member of the All Progressives Congress (APC), Kolawole polled a total of 36,115 votes to defeat the Peoples Democratic Party candidate (PDP), Mrs Rita Orji, who got 32,557 votes in the supplementary election in the 2019 Nigerian General Elections. He was succeeded by Kalejaiye Adeboye Paul.

== Early life, education and career ==
Kolawole was born in Lagos Island but grew up in Amukoko, Ajegunle, Lagos State. His parents were late Alhaji (Chief) Kolawole Tiamiyu Ojuolape and Chief (Mrs.) Kolawole Simbiat Asake (Nee Ajayi). He attended W.J. David Memorial Baptist School, Lagos Island, Lagos for his primary education from 1970 to 1976, and then proceeded to St. Charles Grammar School, Osogbo, Osun State for his secondary education from 1979 to 1984. Kolawole then enrolled at the Federal Polytechnic, Bida in Niger State from 1986 to 1988 where he obtained his Ordinary National Diploma (OND) in Statistics. After that, he went on to pursue a Bachelor's degree in Statistics at the University of Ilorin.

After completing his National Youth Service Corps (NYSC) program, Kolawole furthered his education and earned a M.Sc. degree in Statistics from the University of Ibadan in 1994. He started his career in 2001 at Kolad Concept Limited, and also gained work experience at Tripple G Plc, Abule-Osun, Lagos before entering into politics.

== Political career ==
Kolawole began his political career at the grassroots level in 1999 as a member of the Social Democratic Party (SDP), then later joined the Grassroots Democratic Movement (GDM) and, the Alliance for Democracy (AD). He was one of the longest-serving members of the Lagos State House of Assembly. He was in the Lagos House of Assembly from the 4th to the 7th Legislative Assemblies ( 1999-2015). He was elected as the Majority Leader during the 6th Legislative Assembly in 2007 and also elected as the Deputy Speaker during the 7th Legislative Assembly in 2011. Kolawole has held various leadership positions in the Lagos State House of Assembly. He has served as Chairman of different committees such as Hotels and Tourism, House Services, Science and Technology, Education, Economic Planning and Budget, and Environment. He has been re-elected four times representing the Ajeromi-Ifelodun Local Government Constituency I. Unfortunately, his bid to win a fifth term in the Lagos State House of Assembly was unsuccessful as he lost the election to Bayo Famakinwa, the Peoples Democratic Party (PDP) candidate, ending his aspirations.

In 2016, Kolawole was appointed as Chairman of IBILE Micro Finance Bank, a bank created by the Lagos State Government during the Akinwunmi Ambode administration and licensed by the Central Bank of Nigeria to alleviate poverty, reduce unemployment, and increase financial inclusion in Lagos State. After a supplementary election in 71 polling units across eight wards of the Ajeromi-Ifelodun Federal constituency for the House of Representatives seat, Kolawole was declared winner of the election in 2019 National Assembly. He polled a total of 36,115 votes to defeat his closest rival, Mrs. Rita Orji of the Peoples Democratic Party (PDP) who got 32,557 votes.
