= Alasia, Lagos =

Alasia
- Town
- Location of Alasia in Nigeria
- Coordinates: 6°47′25″N 3°16′9″E
- Country: Nigeria
- State: Lagos State
- LGA: Ojo

Area
  - Total: 52 sq mi (135 km^{2})
- Time zone: UTC+1 (WAT)
- ZIP: 102101

Alasia is a rapidly developing residential and commercial community located in the Ojo Local Government Area (LGA) of Lagos State. While specific census figures for Alasia alone are not publicly detailed, it is part of Ojo which has an estimated population exceeding 800,000 residents according to recent projections. The area is strategically situated along the Lagos-Badagry Expressway. and is well-known for its proximity to major landmarks like the Lagos Business School (LBS) and various gated estates. The area is an informally planned working class district located to the west of Satellite Town, Lagos and home to the Alaba International Market and Lagos State University.

== History ==
Alasia was founded as a settlement of the Awori people under the traditional jurisdiction of the Olojo of Ojo, originally serving as a quiet fishing and farming village. The area's character shifted dramatically in the late 20th century following the construction of the Lagos-Badagry Expressway and the nearby establishment of the Alaba International Market. Today, it has evolved into an increasingly densely populated commercial, industrial and residential district in the far west of Lagos. Its proximity to the Lagos-Badagry Expressway has been a catalyst for its growth.

Alasia has seen a growing number of middle-income residential developments. Major improvements including a widening and the construction of multiple overpasses were made on the Lagos-Badagry Expressway between 2019 and 2024. The area is home to Federal Government College, Ijanikin and Lagos State University which have contributed to the areas growth.
