= German School Lagos =

- Deutsche Schule Lagos

Location
- Beachland Estate Ibafon P.M.B.: 1190 Apapa; Lagos; Nigeria
- Coordinates: 6.4347987°N 3.324826099°E

Information
- Type: K-12 school
- Website: web.archive.org/web/*/http://ds-nigeria.info

German School Lagos (German: Deutsche Schule Lagos; DSL) was a German international school in Apapa, Lagos State, Nigeria for pupils in years 1–13.

It was a part of the Deutsche Schulen Nigeria (DS-Nigeria or DSN) system, which includes the Deutsche Schule Abuja. The school was annexed to the Abuja school in 2009, and it closed in 2013. The network is controlled by Julius Berger Nigeria PLC.
