= Akwa Ibom International Worship Center =

Worship centre in Akwa Ibom State, Nigeria

Coordinates: 4.9975°N 7.9262°E

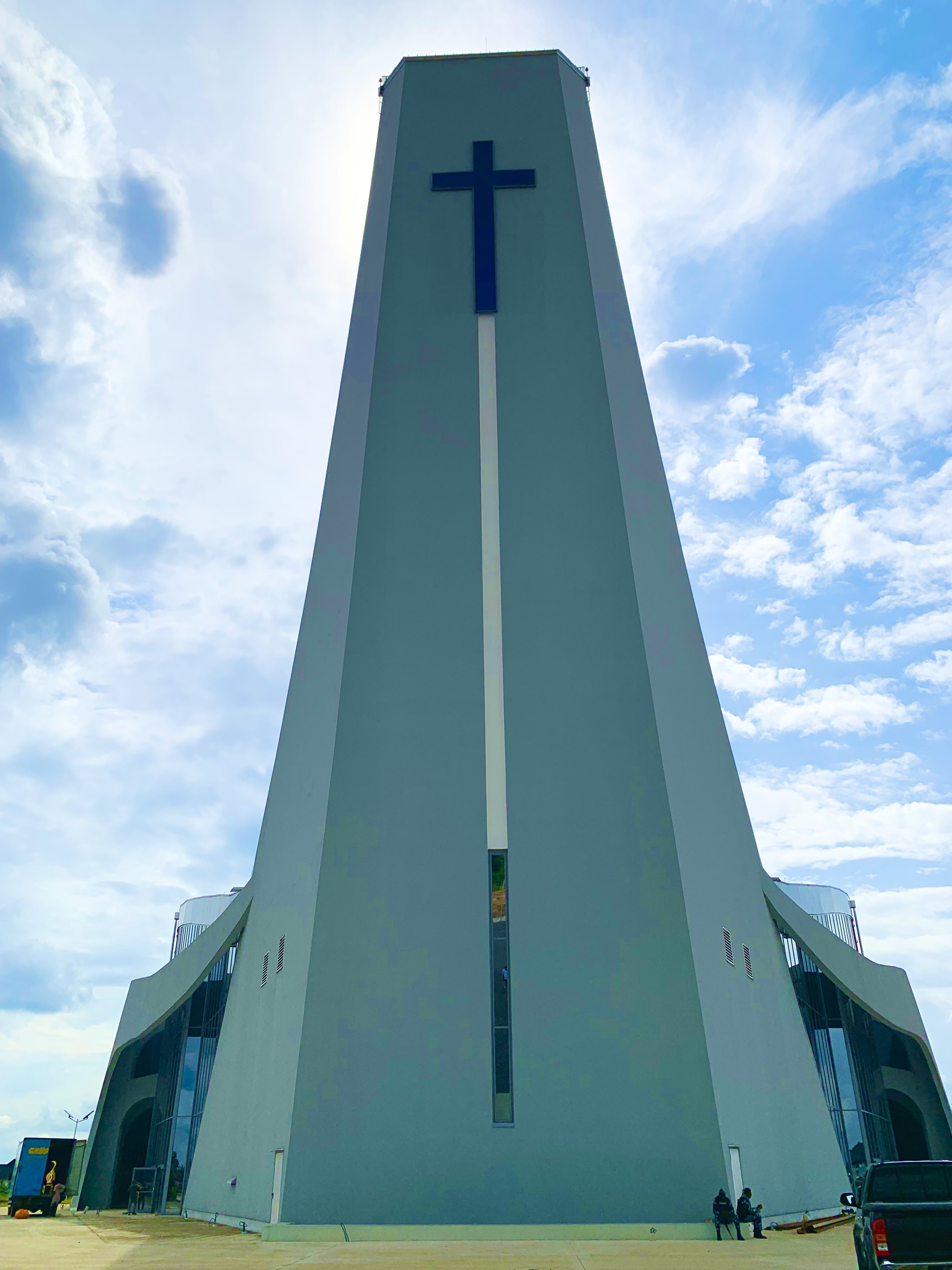
Close shot of the International Worship Center, Uyo

Akwa Ibom International Worship Center is located in Uyo, Akwa Ibom state, Nigeria.

The Akwa Ibom International Worship Center was built under the administration of Governor Udom Emmanuel. The worship center was constructed by Julius Berger company, starting in 2021. It was completed in 2022 and officially launched on 28 May 2023.

The Akwa Ibom International Worship Center has a distinctive architectural features and situated on a 9.5 hectares (23 acres) land, It has the capacity to accommodate 5,500 visitors and its 45,600 m^{2} (54,500 yd^{2}) size podium is sizable enough to host international gatherings.

It was built to be a place where global communities are served, offer a space where expatriate, outreach and missionary needs are met, and as a tourist destination.
