= Nigerian Shippers' Council =

Nigerian agency

- Abbreviation: NSC
- Formation: 1978
- Type: Government Organization
- Purpose: cargo interest.
- Headquarters: Lagos
- Location: Nigeria
- Official language: English
- Executive Secretary/CEO: Pius Ukeyima Akutah
- Website: shipperscouncil.gov.ng

Nigerian Shippers' Council is an agency of the Federal Government of Nigeria. The council provides forum for the protection of the interest of shippers on matters affecting the shipment of imports and exports to and from Nigeria. The Agency is under the supervision of Ministry of Marine and Blue Economy (Nigeria). The council is focused on the importing and exporting of cargo with regards to port-to-port shipment through the chain of transportation. Its mandate is to establish an effective environment for all Nigerian stakeholders by putting sufficient and good economic regulatory system in Nigerian Port transportation sector.

== History ==
The Nigerian Shippers’ Council was established in the year 1978, with the help of UNCTAD, by the law of Nigerian Shippers’ Council Act Cap. N133 LFN 2004.

== Regulations ==
The council works based on The Federal Government Port Reform Agenda and it is under Port Economic Regulator of February 2014 and was affirmed by the Ministerial Regulation: Nigerian Shippers’ Council (Port Economic) Regulations 2015; and the Presidential Order: Nigerian Shippers’ Council (Port Economic Regulator) Order, 2015.

== See also ==
- Nigerian Ports Authority
