= Ajegunle =

District of Lagos State, Nigeria

Coordinates: 6.4406°N 3.3515°E

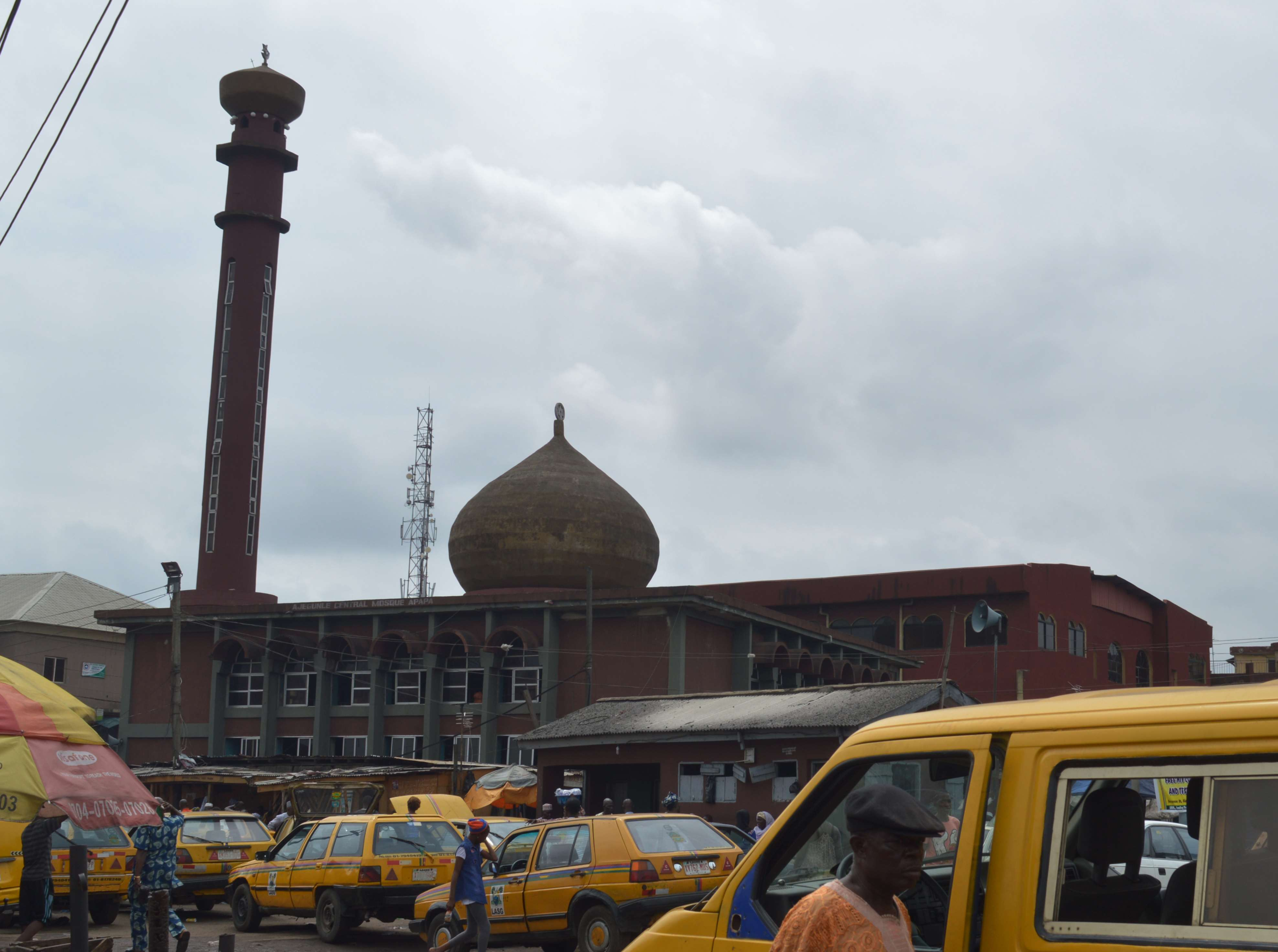
Ajegunle Central Mosque

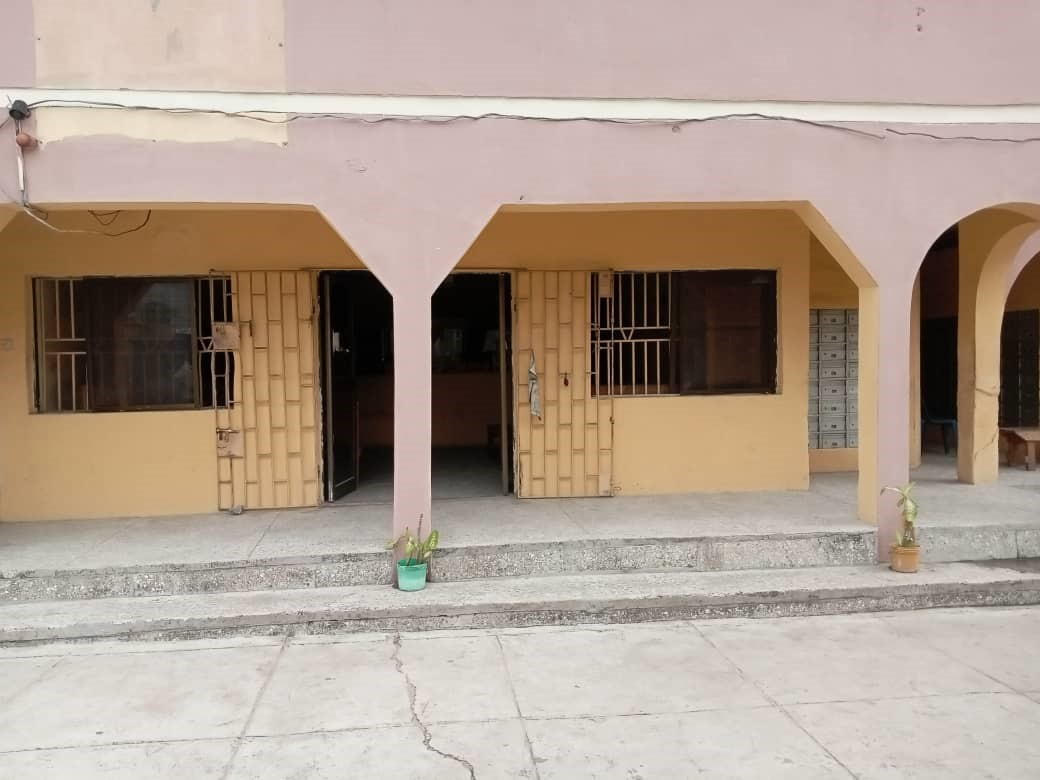
Ajegunle Post Office

Ajegunle, popularly known as "AJ City" or simply "AJ", is a neighbourhood located in the heart of Lagos, Lagos State, Nigeria. It is located in the Ajeromi-Ifelodun local government area of Lagos. Ajegunle in the Yoruba language means "A place where riches dwells."

It is bordered on the west by Apapa Wharf and Tincan, two of Nigeria's biggest sea ports through which over 70 percent of imported goods come into the country. Ajegunle has a population of about 550,000 residents from many of the ethnic groups in Nigeria.

== History ==
The community was subject to the Ijaw/Ilaje conflict that became an inspiration for the album CRISIS, released in 2007 by African China.

The last national population census in Nigeria was conducted in 2006. It recorded a population of approximately 140 million people. A census was planned for 2024.

Ajegunle, a densely populated suburb of Lagos, has experienced significant changes since 2008. Traditionally known for its challenges such as poverty, crime, and inadequate infrastructure, the community has nonetheless produced notable figures in Nigerian entertainment and sports, such as musicians and footballers. However, the area remains marked by underdevelopment.

In recent years, Ajegunle has seen some degree of urban renewal. Investments from private individuals have led to the construction of modern buildings, hotels, and event centers, replacing older, dilapidated structures. This wave of development has been described as gentrification, with the influx of private capital transforming the community while also raising concerns about displacement and inadequate infrastructure planning.

On the social front, initiatives like Paradigm Initiative's LIFE (Life Skills, ICTs, Financial Readiness, and Entrepreneurship) program have targeted youth empowerment and digital literacy. The program, which originated as Ajegunle.org, has helped youths from the community acquire relevant skills to improve their economic opportunities. The success of these programs has led to their expansion across other parts of Nigeria and Africa.

Despite these efforts, Ajegunle still faces many socio-economic issues.

== Notable people ==
Ajegunle has produced several notable footballers including Samson Siasia, former coach of the Nigeria national team, former Manchester United striker Odion Ighalo, former Super Eagles defender Taribo West, Chinwendu Ihezuo of the Nigeria women's national team, and Emmanuel Amuneke, former African Footballer of the Year.

Musician Daddy Showkey also rose to fame there in the late 1990s. Others are Don Jazzy, and Pantoranking.
