= Kalejaiye Adeboye Paul =

Nigerian politician

Federal Representative
- Preceded by: Taiwo Kolawole
- Constituency: Ajeromi-Ifelodun

Personal details
- Party: All Progressive Congress (APC)
- Occupation: Politician

Kalejaiye Adeboye Paul is a Nigerian politician. He currently serves as a member of the Federal House of Representative, representing Ajeromi Ifelodun constituency in the 10th Nigerian National Assembly. He succeeded Taiwo Kolawole. He was elected under the platform of the All Progressive Congress (APC).
