= Lagos Trade Fair Complex =

Coordinates: 6.464°N 3.247°E

- Interactive map of the Lagos Trade Fair Complex area

General information
- Location: Satellite Town, Lagos, Nigeria, Lagos-Badagry Expressway
- Opened: 1977
- Owner: Federal Government of Nigeria

The Lagos International Trade Fair Complex is a 350 hectares (860 acres) facility in Satellite Town, Lagos along Lagos-Badagry Expressway hosting a number of market traders. The facility was constructed in the 1970s and planned to host an international trade fair upon fulfillment. In 2002, jewelry, auto spare parts and other consumer goods traders from Balogun Market on Lagos Island relocated to the complex. Today, the complex hosts traders representing a number of trade factions including Balogun Business Association, Auto Spare Parts And Machineries Dealers Association (ASPMDA), and jewelers under the banner of Association of Progressive Traders.

The facility was designed by Zoran Bojović and constructed by Energoprojeckt in partnership with the Nigerian government. It was opened in 1977 to coincide with the first Lagos International Trade Fair. At fulfillment, it was the biggest project of Energoprojekt in Nigeria. The company and its designers including Bojovic also executed projects in Kano and Yola. It is theorized by Rem Koolhaas that Bojovic incorporated some of the architectural forms found in Kano into the designs of the trade fair complex.

The design of the complex placed emphasis on exposition pavilions, a demonstration hall was dedicated to the federal government while state governments also had their own halls. Two halls were each dedicated to Nigerian and international corporations. Other facilities within the complex were a recreation park and an artificial lake adjacent to the park, a number of chalets, a press center, shopping stalls and a festival square.

Over the years, the infrastructure within the complex has been poorly maintained. The complex was concessioned to a private firm in 2007, but that approval was abolished in 2018.

== Facilities and infrastructure ==
The complex has a variety of facilities designed to accommodate diverse commercial activities:

Exhibition halls: There are twelve halls, each averaging 1,050 square meters, providing enough space for trade exhibitions and events.

Administration complex: This includes banking halls, an auditorium, and reception areas to support business operations.

Motel complex (accommodation): This is a lodging facility with 100 chalets caters for exhibitors and visitors.

Recreational spaces: This has a restaurant, an artificial lake, sports facilities, and relaxation areas.

Warehouses: These are storage spaces dedicated for businesses operating within a complex.

Staff quarters: These are housing units for employees working at the facility.

== Market activities and trade associations ==
The Lagos trade fair complex homes various business associations, making it a thriving commercial hub. Below are a few key groups:

Balogun business association: This association primarily deals in textiles, clothing, and household goods.

Auto spare parts and machinery dealers: This association focuses on automobile parts and industrial equipment trades.

Association of progressive traders: This association specializes in sales of jewelry, luxury goods, and fashion accessories.
