= Jimoh Adewale Babatunde =

Nigerian politician

Member of the House of Representatives
- In office 2011–2015
- Constituency: Apapa

Personal details
- Born: Apapa, Lagos State, Nigeria
- Occupation: Politician

Jimoh Adewale Babatunde is a Nigerian politician from Apapa, Lagos State, Nigeria.

== Political life ==
Jimoh Adewale Babatunde served as a member of the House of Representatives, representing the Apapa constituency in Lagos State from 2011 to 2015. In 2023, the Lagos State Governor appointed him to the seven-man committee of the Lagos State Universal Basic Education Board (LASUBEB).
