= Julius Berger (company) =

Nigerian construction company

Julius Berger Nigeria Plc
- Type: Public
- Traded as: NGX: JBERGER
- Industry: Construction, real estate development
- Founded: 1950; 76 years ago
- Headquarters: 10 Shettima A. Munguno Crescent, 900 108 Utako, Abuja, FCT, Nigeria
- Products: Pre-engineered steel buildings
- Services: Design, fabrication, erection
- Parent: Bilfinger
- Website: julius-berger.com

Julius Berger (pronounced /ˈdʒu.liəs ˈbɛɡ.ər/ JOO-LEOUS BEH-gə) is a Nigerian construction company, headquartered in Abuja, with additional permanent locations in Lagos and Uyo.

Julius Berger Nigeria Plc is a Nigerian company offering holistic services covering the planning, design, engineering, construction, operation and maintenance of buildings, infrastructure and industry projects in Nigeria.

The company is represented across Nigeria in structural engineering and infrastructure works, and in southern Nigeria through domestic and international oil and gas industry projects. It is known for constructing most of Nigeria's infrastructure, major expressways, and even some residential buildings for the Chevron Nigeria headquarters in Lagos.

The company has been listed on the Nigerian Stock Exchange since 1991. The construction business of Julius Berger is the heart of the Julius Berger Group. With 18,000 employees from close to 40 nations and clients from both Nigeria and the global oil and gas industry.

== History ==
Julius Berger's presence in Nigeria dates back to 1965 when the firm won a tender to construct a ₦31.2 million second mainland bridge In Lagos. The project was a significant civil engineering endeavor because it was the first in the country to be built with pre-stressed concrete. The construction of the bridge was designed in phases with the first phase completed in 1969 and last phase completed in 1974. While working on the project, Berger undertook other projects in the country, municipal water works project in Jos awarded by the government of Benue-Plateau State was the firm's first construction project outside of LAGOS STATE. This project involved building a reservoir to conserve rain water and building a dam, water treatment plant and tanks. The firm's efficiency in building the first phase of Eko bridge made it a top choice to repair the bridge over River Niger which had been damaged during the civil war. This project kept the company busy in Nigeria.

When the war ended, vehicular and shipping traffic in Lagos increased and additional road infrastructure such as Eko bridge did little to ease traffic congestion. To ease traffic congestion, the government awarded Berger additional road construction contracts, the projects and the Niger bridge made viable a permanent establishment in the country. The Lagos State projects included the construction of the Lagos - Badagry expressway, Itoikin-Ikorudu-Epe single carriageway, and ring roads and Apapa - Oshodi and Agege Motor Road. Gradually the firm and its blue B logo established a reputation in civil engineering works within the country, this coincided with a period that the federal government focused its attention on developing the country's Trunk A road system. The firm was involved in constructing the 26-mile Lagos to Shagamu portion of Lagos to Ibadan expressway and Jebba road bridge.

Julius Berger was registered in Nigeria prior to building the Jos water works, in 1974. It sold 40% of its equity to Lagos and Benue-Plateau State governments and three years later sold an additional 20% to the public. After a cement armada caused chaos at Apapa port, the company was invited to build a new port at Tin Can Island. In the 1970s and early 1980s, it was involved in the civil works at Aladja and Ajaokuta Steel complexes and the new federal capital territory, Abuja.

== Timeline ==
In August 1965, the company founded in Germany undertook its first project in Nigeria - the construction of the Eko Bridge in Lagos, which was approved by Shehu Shagari when he was a Minister of Works. In 1991 the company was floated on the Nigerian Stock Exchange as "Julius Berger Nigeria Plc".

In 2001, the company moved to its new head office in Abuja.

In 2010, Business World Magazine listed Julius Berger Nigeria Plc as Nigeria's leading construction company.

In 2012, Watertown Energy Ltd., a company of the Nestoil Group acquired 10% of Julius Berger Nigeria Plc's shares, previously owned by Bilfinger Berger GmbH, raising the company's Nigerian shareholding to 60.1%.

In October 2018, the company announces changes to the management structure, including the appointment of a new managing director.

== Major projects ==
The following are a list of popular projects handled and currently ongoing by Julius Berger:

- Eko Bridge completed in 1968, the Third Mainland Bridge completed in 1990 and the Abuja Stadium completed in 2003.
- Tin Can Island Port, commissioned in 1977.
- Lagos Inner Ring Road, completed in 1979.
- Ajaokuta Steel Plant, completed in 1990.
- Itakpe – Ajaokuta Ore Railway, completed in 1990.
- Abuja International Airport phase II, completed in 1997.
- Central Bank of Nigeria Head Office, completed in 2002.
- Uyo infrastructure and road works, ongoing since 2008.
- First discharge drain built utilizing pipe-jacking technology in Nigeria, completed in 2011.
- National Assembly phase III, completed in 2011.
- Multiple projects, Escravos GTL plant in southern Nigeria, commissioned in 2012.
- Bonny Liquefied Natural Gas facility, multiple ongoing works since 1996.
- Challawa Gorge Dam Karaye, completed in 1992
- Awarded a contract to construct link roads to second Niger bridge (July 4, 2018)

== Education ==
The organization operates German School Abuja, and formerly operated German School Lagos.
