= Apapa =

- City and LGA
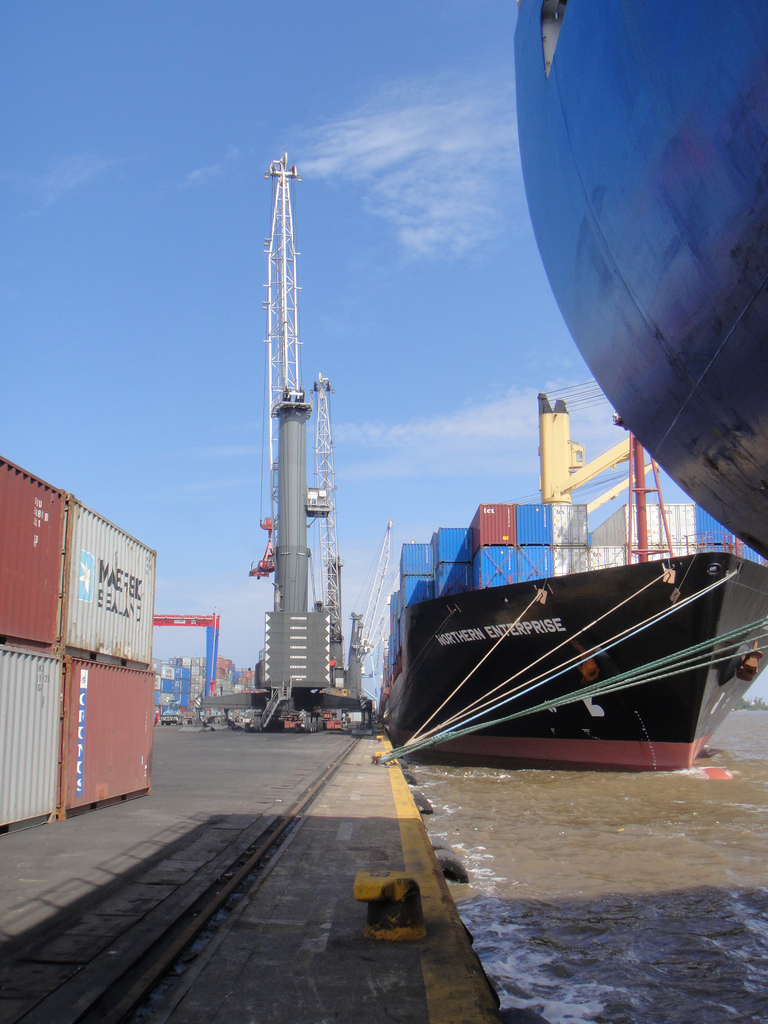
- Apapa Port

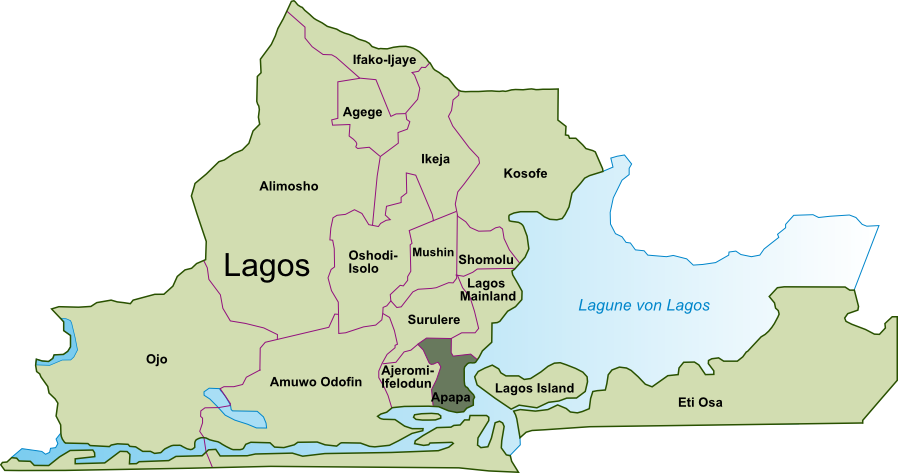
- Interactive map of Apapa
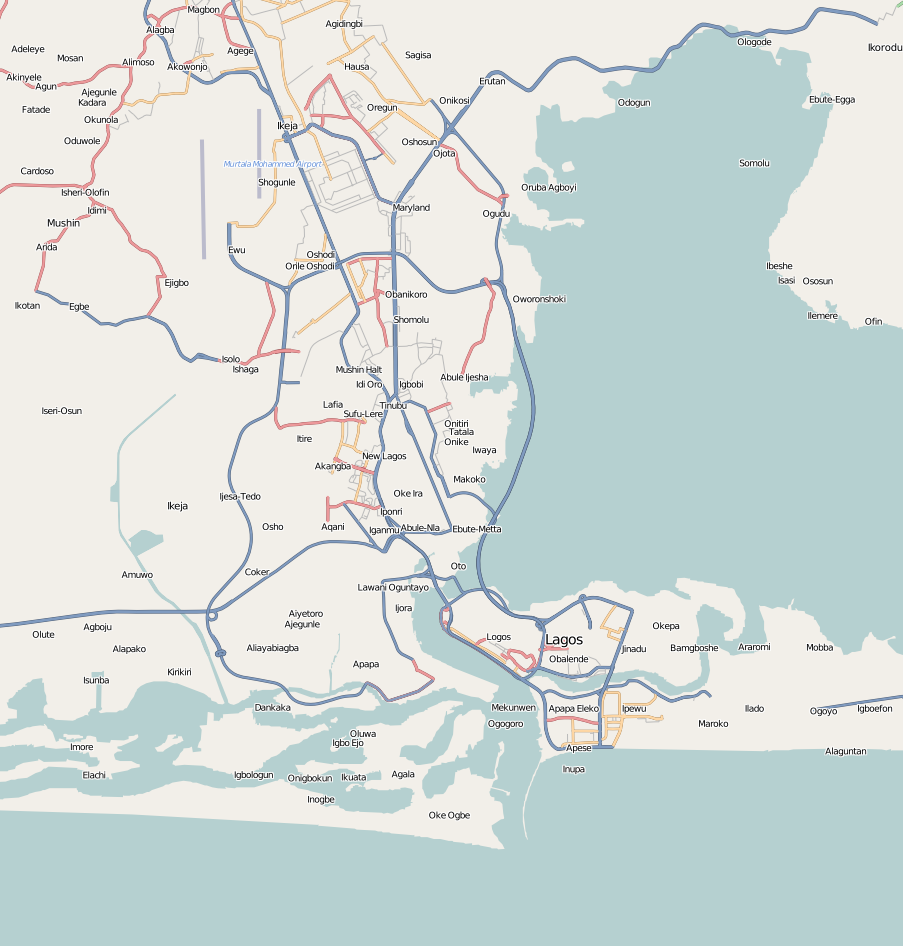
- Location in Lagos
- Coordinates: 6°27′N 3°22′E
- Country: Nigeria
- State: Lagos State
- City: Lagos

Government
  - Sole Administrator: Jide Alao

Population (2006)
  - Total: 217,362
- Time zone: UTC+1 (WAT)

Apapa is a city and Local Government Area in Lagos, Nigeria located to the west of Lagos Island on the mouth of the Lagos Lagoon. Apapa is home to a number of port facilities operated by the Nigerian Ports Authority, including the Apapa Port Complex and Tin Can Island Port. Together these serve as the country's largest and busiest maritime gateways for international trade. Beyond its maritime infrastructure, the district is a major industrial hub containing significant refineries, warehouses, and the headquarters of several major shipping and logistics companies. While largely commercial, Apapa also features residential areas, including a Government Reserved Area (GRA), though the region is frequently defined by the heavy vehicular traffic associated with its intensive port operations.

== Overview ==
The region of Apapa lies near the mouth of Lagos Lagoon, and contains ports and terminals for various commodities such as containers and bulk cargo, houses, offices and a small old disused railway station (Apapa North). It is located directly west of Lagos Island and east of Ajeromi-Ifelodun. It is the site of a major container terminal which was owned and operated by the Federal government of Nigeria until March 2005, and now is operated by the Danish firm A. P. Moller-Maersk Group. Adjacent to the container port is the Tin Can Island Port, which has ro-ro facilities.

Apapa's built environment is characterized by a stark duality between its industrial maritime infrastructure and its historic residential layouts. The district's landscape is dominated by the massive horizontal footprints of the Lagos Port Complex to the east and Tin Can Island Port to the south. These two facilities feature vast container terminals, high-capacity warehouses, and towering gantry cranes. Interspersed among these industrial zones are mid-rise commercial corridors, primarily along Wharf Road and Creek Road, consisting of functional concrete-frame buildings that house shipping, insurance, and logistics firms.

In contrast to the industrial zones, the Apapa Government Reserved Area (GRA) was developed following a low-density Garden city movement. This area is defined by a grid-like street pattern with wide, tree-lined avenues and large property plots. The architecture ranges from colonial-era bungalows, designed with high ceilings and deep verandas for natural ventilation, to contemporary Tropical Modernist villas and multi-story luxury apartments. Ijora and Badia are more working class and informally built residential districts in the northern section of Apapa while Ajegunle is more affluent and built to the Garden City design. In addition to these residential and industrial districts, the neighborhood is home to a number of prominent commercial businesses including the major Nigerian newspaper This Day.

== History ==
Apapa was a small fishing village inhabited primarily by the Awori sub-group of the Yoruba people. Its transformation into a strategic urban hub began in the early 20th century under British colonial rule, following the completion of the moles at the entrance to the Lagos harbor which allowed for deep-sea vessels to enter the lagoon. In the 1920s, the colonial government designated Apapa for large-scale industrial and maritime development, leading to the construction of the Lagos Port Complex in 1913 and its subsequent expansion in the 1950s. To support this growth, the Apapa Government Reserved Area (GRA) was established as a low-density residential district to house colonial administrators and technical staff, characterized by its "Garden City" planning and expansive bungalows. An important bronze hoard of jewellery dating from the 16th Century was found in Apapa in 1907 and is now kept at the British Museum.

In 1950, the development of an industrial and housing estate covering 1,000 acres began. The estate was completed in 1957/1958 and it flourished along with the expansion of the Apapa Wharf. The estate once accounted for a large number of industrial and construction workers in Lagos. Following Nigeria's independence in 1960, Apapa underwent rapid industrialization, evolving into the country's most significant economic gateway. The 1970s oil boom necessitated the construction of the Tin Can Island Port, which was commissioned in 1977 to alleviate severe congestion at the existing Apapa quays. This period saw the proliferation of manufacturing plants, flour mills, and petroleum tank farms, firmly establishing the district as a central node in the national supply chain. However, the late 20th and early 21st centuries brought significant urban challenges; the sheer volume of cargo movement overwhelmed the existing road infrastructure, leading to chronic traffic congestion and a gradual decline in the residential quality of the GRA. In recent years, government efforts have focused on rehabilitating the Oshodi–Apapa Expressway and reviving rail links to modernize the district's logistics capacity.

== Infrastructure ==
Apapa's transportation network is defined by its strategic role as Nigeria's maritime gateway, relying on a system of high-capacity expressways and essential bridge links. The primary road artery is the Oshodi–Apapa Expressway a major 10-lane corridor that connects the ports to the Lagos-Ibadan Expressway, Lagos-Badagry Expressway and the Murtala Muhammed International Airport. This highway was recently reconstructed using long-lasting concrete pavement to handle the heavy axle loads of port traffic. Additionally, the district is connected to Lagos Island and other parts of the mainland via the Eko Bridge and the Iddo Bridge, which serve as critical nodes for both commercial haulage and commuter movement.

While there are no rapid transit subway stations directly within the central residential heart of Apapa, the district is served by the national rail network and is adjacent to the Blue Line (Lagos Transit). The Apapa Railway Station operates as a terminal for the Nigerian Railway Corporation (NRC), facilitating both freight movement to the hinterland and passenger services on the Lagos-Ibadan standard gauge line. For urban commuters, the Blue Line (Lagos Transit) does not enter Apapa itself but features major stations nearby at Iganmu and National Theatre, Nigeria, which provide elevated metro connections across the lagoon to Lagos Marina. The proposed Coastal Railway is planned to eventually link Apapa and Tin Can Island directly to the broader metropolitan rail system.

== Housing and Social Infrastructure ==
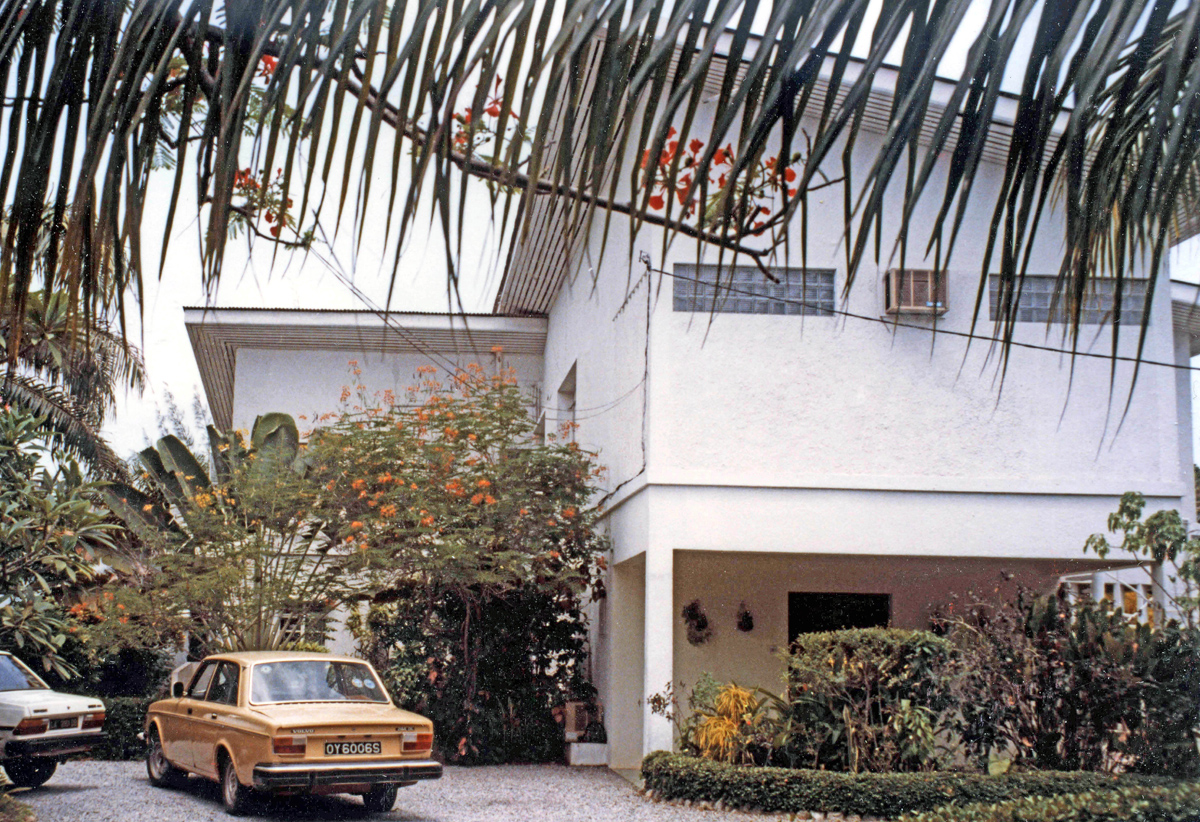
Executive housing in Marine Road Apapa in 1986

The district provides housing for various levels of housing needs from executive requirements to average families including single occupation and multiple storied accommodation. The residential landscape of Apapa is stratified into high-density industrial settlements and exclusive, low-density enclaves. The Apapa Government Reserved Area (GRA) remains the district's most prominent residential zone, originally designed as an elite "European Reserve Area" during the colonial period. It is characterized by spacious estates, quiet tree-lined streets, and high-value real estate that caters to senior maritime executives and wealthy business owners. Conversely, areas such as Badia and parts of Ajegunle represent more working-class and informal housing settlements, often housing the labor force for the nearby ports and factories. Over the years, some of these informal districts have faced government demolition and urban renewal efforts due to their proximity to critical port infrastructure.

Social and recreational life in Apapa is anchored by long-standing private institutions and modern commercial facilities. The Apapa Club, founded in the 1930s, is one of the oldest social clubs in Nigeria, offering facilities for tennis, swimming, and squash to its members. Another major landmark is the Apapa Amusement Park, which was extensively renovated to provide family-oriented green space and rides in a region otherwise dominated by heavy industry. Healthcare needs are served by a mix of public and private providers, including the Military Hospital Lagos and several private clinics such as Dako Medical Centre and Faleti Medical Centre, which specialize in catering to the local industrial workforce and residential population.

Apapa hosts a variety of educational institutions ranging from public primary schools to specialized private academies, as well as the Nigerian University of Technology and Management. The district was formerly the location of the German School Lagos before its relocation, reflecting the area's history as an expatriate hub. Current notable schools in the area include United Christian Secondary School and various private Montessori and international primary schools situated within the GRA to serve the local elite. Higher education and vocational training are represented by specialized maritime and technical institutes that support the neighboring shipping industry, ensuring a local pipeline of skilled labor for the Nigerian Ports Authority (NPA) and multinational logistics firms.

== Climate ==
Apapa experiences an average temperature of 27 degrees Celsius or 80 degrees Fahrenheit, accompanied by an estimated humidity of 88 percent. The primary seasons include the dry season and the rainy season, the latter marked by intermittent heavy showers.

Apapa has a cloudy wet season, a partly cloudy dry season, and consistently hot and oppressive weather throughout the year. Temperatures typically range from 23 °C (74 °F) to 33 °C (91 °F), seldom dropping below 21 °C (70 °F) or exceeding 34 °C (94 °F). The period with high temperatures spans 4.7 months, running from December 6 to April 29, where the daily high averages above 32 °C (89 °F). March stands out as the hottest month, with an average high of 33 °C (91 °F) and a low of 26 °C (79 °F). Conversely, the cooler season extends for 3 months, starting from June 26 to September 28, featuring daily highs averaging below 29 °C (84 °F). August emerges as the coldest month, with an average low of 24 °C (75 °F) and a high of 28 °C (82 °F).

== See also ==
- Railway stations in Nigeria
- Apapa Amusement Park
- Tin Can Island Port
- Lagos Port Complex
