= Onne =

Coordinates: 4°41′23″N 7°09′28″E

- Location within Nigeria
- Country: Nigeria
- State: Rivers

Population (2016)
  - Total: 43,739

Onne, also known as Onne-Eleme, is a town in Eleme, Rivers State, Nigeria. The town is a host to one of the two prominent ports in Nigeria. It is bordered by the towns of Alode, Ebubu, and the Ngololo River, which is one of the tributaries of the Bonny River.

== Port and shipyards ==
Onne is a relatively major port in the region and has several quays with facilities for cargo ships up to 60,000 gross tons. It is also the main base for the offshore activity in the region, and a large number of supply-vessels call at Onne every week. This section of the port is called Onne Oil and Gas Free Zone and contains several quays to cater to off shore supply vessels and a shipyard (West Atlantic Shipyard). The Onne Oil and Gas Free Zone also contains Shell Nigeria Exploration & Production Company, one of the largest bases of Shell offshore in Africa including berths leased out to ExxonMobil, TotalEnergies and other oil companies.

The port consists of three regions adjacent to the Niger delta: Federal lighter terminal, Onne port complex and Federal ocean limited (which consists of facilities for offshore oil and gas supply vessels).

Stores and freshwater are available as well as fuel and minor repairs. It also has a container terminal (West Africa Container Terminal) with a deep draft of 12 metres or 39 feet and frequented by vessels up to 4000 TEU in size belonging to Maersk lines and Pacific International Lines and CMA CGM.

== Administration ==
The city is part of Odido District in Eleme Local Government Area of Rivers State, Nigeria. Onne has four clans, Agbeta, Alejor, Ekara and Ogoloma. There are other smaller settlements within Onne, such as Eyaa camp. The people of Onne speak Eleme language.

== See also ==
- Port of Port Harcourt
- Nigerian Ports Authority
- Transport in Nigeria
- Railway stations in Nigeria
