= Apapa Hoard =

Collection of jewelry

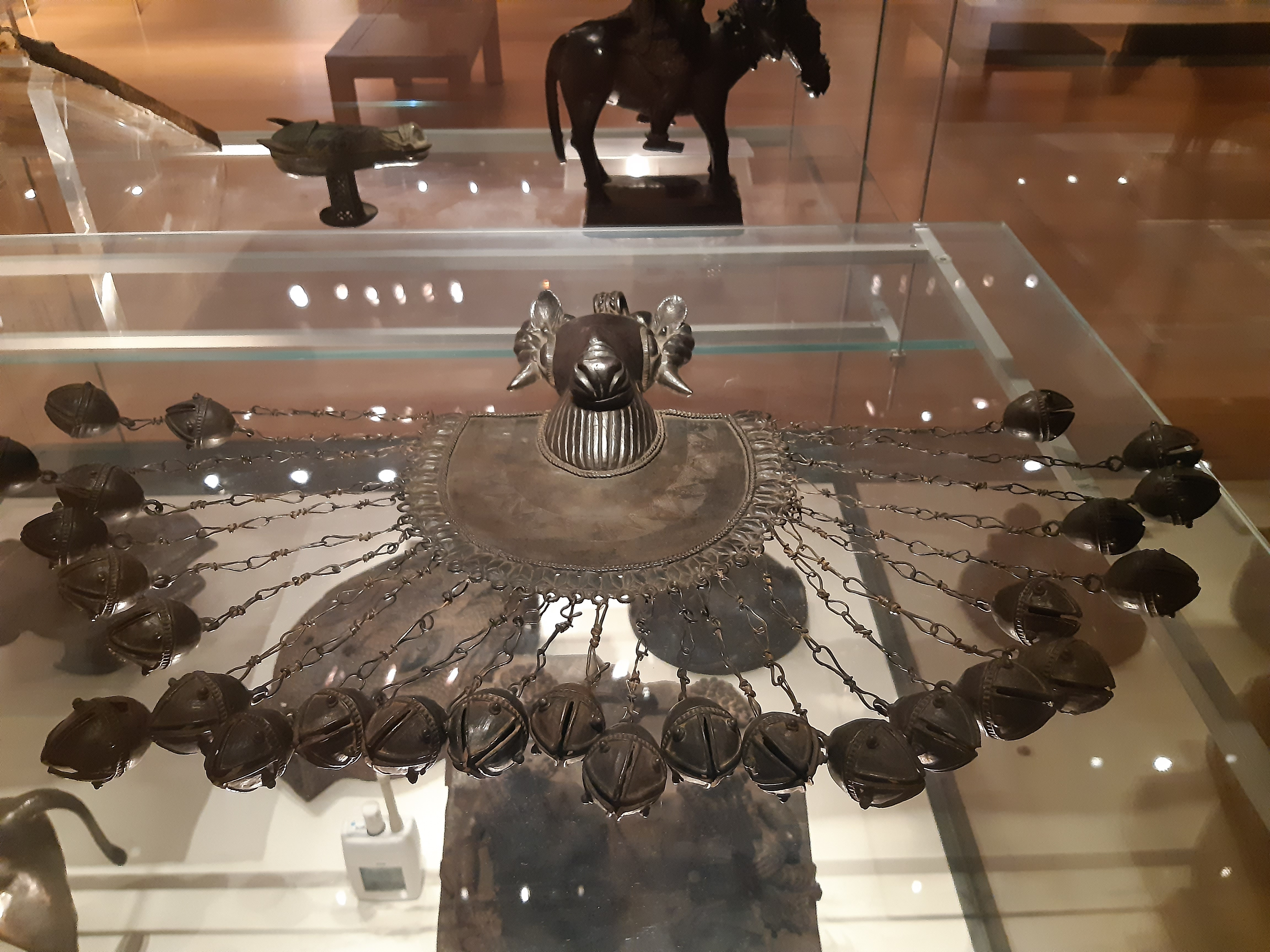
- Pectoral mask with bells from the hoard in the British Museum
- Material: Bronze
- Size: 43 cm high, 35 cm wide
- Created: Sixteenth century AD
- Present location: British Museum, London
- Registration: Af1930,0423.1

The Apapa Hoard is an important collection of medieval bronze jewelry found at Apapa near Lagos, Nigeria. Dating to the early 16th Century, the hoard has been part of the British Museum's collection since 1930.

== Description ==
Items from the treasure consist entirely of bronze jewellery. They include a pair of wire bracelets, two bracelets designed in the form of interlocking animals, two staff-mounts with pendant bells, two ring-shaped armlets, a group of bells, a ring with cascabels and a breast plate in the shape of a ram's head with pendant bells. The latter object is the most prestigious item from the hoard and is one of the finest cast bronzes ever found in southern Nigeria. The designs and animal motifs suggest symbolic meanings tied to wealth, status, or spiritual protection. The craftsmanship reflects artistic traditions comparable to those of the Benin and Yoruba bronze casters, indicating that sophisticated metalworking techniques were widespread across southern Nigeria long before colonial contact.

== Discovery ==
The hoard was discovered by accident in 1907 when a well was being dug to a depth of 3 metres. The jewellery would have been worn by an elite member of a local tribe living in 15th-16th centuries and has been attributed by scholars to the Yoruba Kingdom of Owo. Soon after its discovery, the hoard was acquired by a private collector who later sold it to the British Museum in 1930.

== See also ==
- Bronze Head from Ife
- Bronze Head of Queen Idia
