= Satellite Town, Lagos =

Satellite Town
- Town
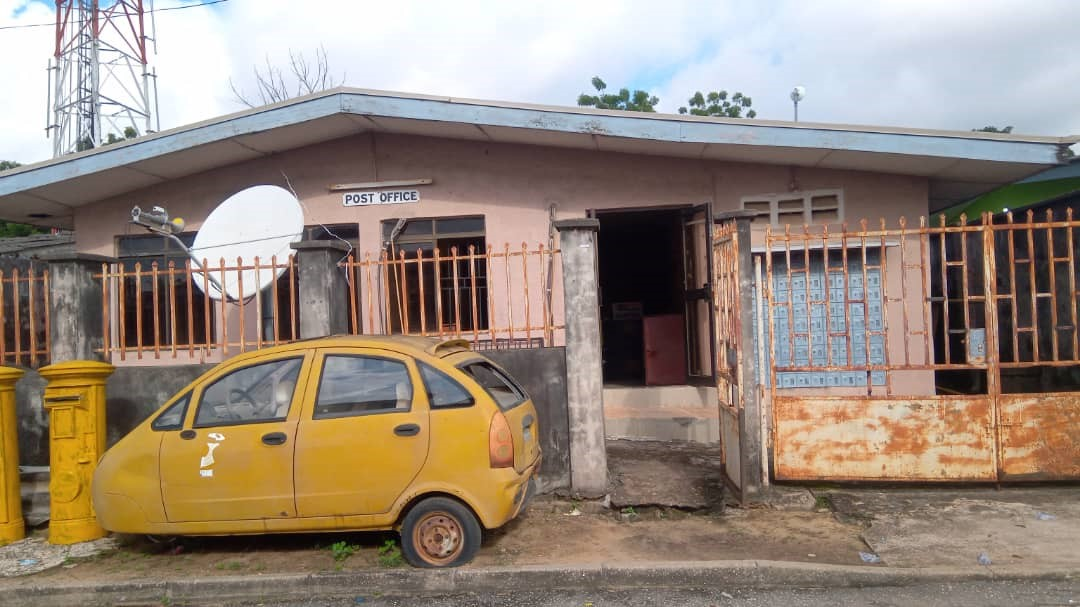
- Satellite Town Post Office

- Location of Satellite Town in Nigeria
- Coordinates: 6°26′59″N 3°17′3″E
- Country: Nigeria
- State: Lagos State
- LGA: Amuwo-Odofin

Area
  - Total: 135 km^{2} (52 sq mi)
- Time zone: UTC+1 (WAT)
- ZIP: 102262

Satellite Town is a community and state housing estate located along the Lagos-Badagry Expressway in Amuwo-Odofin local government area of Lagos State. Its ZIP code is 102262. Satellite Town is a historic federal housing estate originally established in the 1960s. While it was once celebrated as a model of structured urban living, the neighborhood has faced significant challenges over the decades with deteriorating road infrastructure and seasonal flooding. Despite these issues, it remains a highly sought-after and fast-growing residential area due to its relatively affordable rent and its proximity to the Lagos-Badagry Expressway and Lagos Trade Fair Complex.

== History ==
In early 1960, the Lagos State Government set up Satellite Town to help low income earners own their own houses, with some of the areas allocated to oil workers and private buyers. During its early years, the area was a prestigious and serene environment, often allocated to civil servants, oil workers, and private buyers who sought a structured alternative to the crowded city center.

Over the decades, however, the town has faced significant challenges, including rapid urbanization and a lack of sustained government attention, which have led to a decline in its once-standard infrastructure. Despite these issues, it remains a key residential hub in Lagos and has witnessed various recent government interventions aimed at flood control and road rehabilitation.

Among the planned developments in Satellite Town is the Lagos Trade Fair Complex. The Lagos International Trade Fair Complex is a 350-hectare (1.4 sq mi; 860-acre) facility along Lagos-Badagry expressway hosting a number of market traders. The facility was constructed in the 1970s and planned to host an international trade fair upon fulfillment. Originally a planned development, the market has fallen into disrepair and witnessed the growth of informal and illegal encroachments and construction.

== Infrastructure ==
The deplorable state of roads and illegal structures in Satellite Town shows that what was once known to be an estate has, over time, turned into a slum. There were reports that in May 2009, the Lagos State government awarded contracts to help stop flooding, which is a major problem in that area.

Satellite Town in Lagos is primarily served by the Lagos-Badagry Expressway, a major federal highway that provides the main artery for transit but frequently suffers from heavy congestion and sections of physical decay. Residents rely on a mix of regulated Lagos Metropolitan Area Transport Authority buses and informal "danfos" that connect the area to the wider Lagos transport network. The community lacks a centralized municipal sewer system, with most households utilizing individual septic tanks and open drainage gutters that are prone to blockages. This combination of inadequate drainage and a lack of modern sewage infrastructure often leads to significant flooding and environmental challenges during the rainy season.

== Neighborhoods ==
- Festac Town - Festac Town is a historic federal housing estate in Lagos, Nigeria, originally built to house participants of the Second World Black and African Festival of Arts and Culture in 1977. Designed as a self-sufficient festival village, it features a unique grid layout with seven major avenues and was once considered a model of modern urban planning in Africa.
- Kirikiri - Kirikiri is a dual-natured community, best known as the location of Nigeria's most famous high-security correctional facilities, the Kirikiri Maximum Security Prison, including the country's only dedicated female prison. It is located in the eastern part of Satellite Town. The eastern part of the neighborhood hosts a growing collection of port and fuel storage facilities.

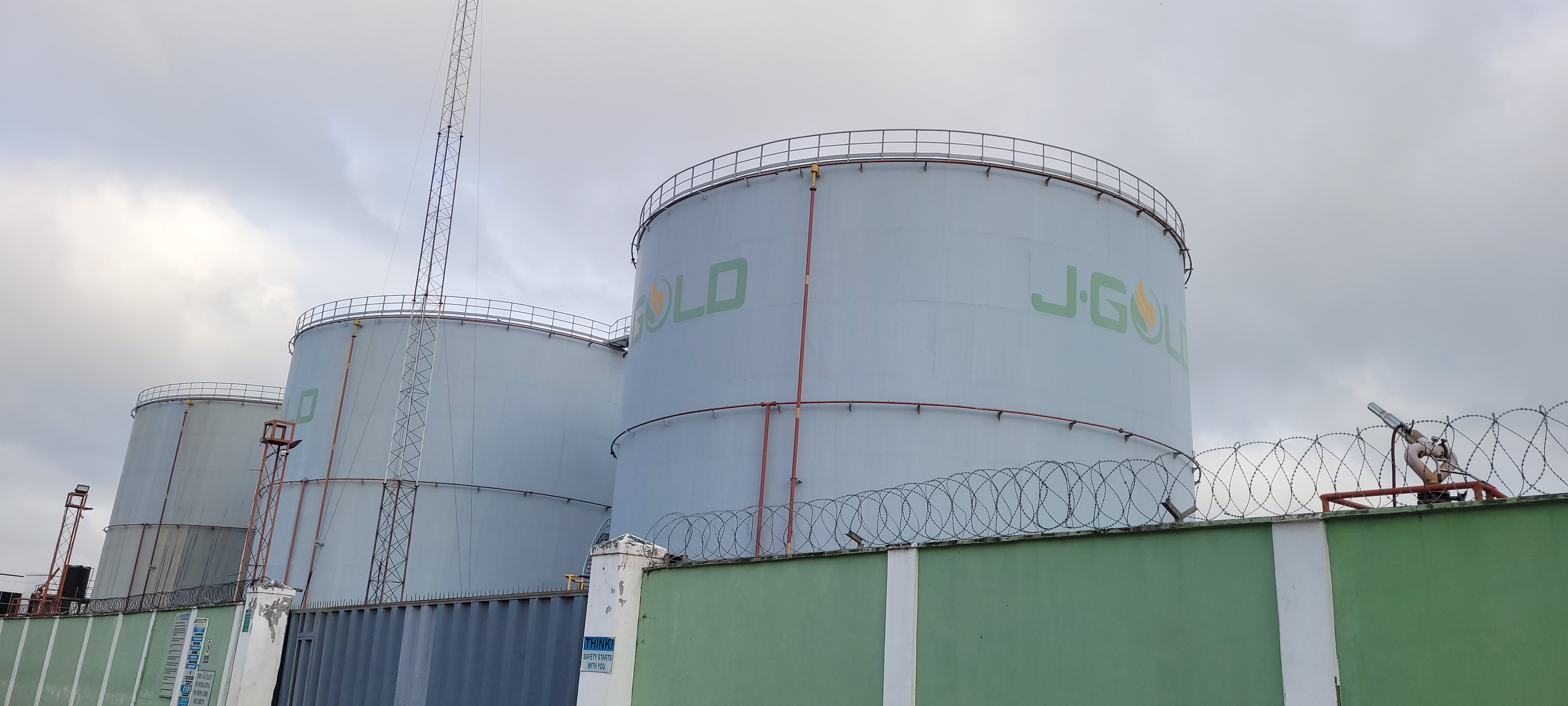
A petrol depot facility set along the industrial waterfront in Kirikiri

- Amuwo - Amuwo is an informal industrial and residential district to the south of the highway. It is located to the north of Kirikiri. It is recognized as a significant commercial and industrial hub due to its proximity to the international border and major ports.
- Oluti - Oluti is a planned residential and commercial neighborhood in the Amuwo-Odofin local government area, situated along the busy Old Ojo Road near the first gate of Festac Town. It serves as a vital transit point for residents and traders moving between the Mile 2 axis and the Agboju market district, contributing to the area's high-energy atmosphere.
- Satellite Town - this is the historic center of Satellite Town and located south of the highway and west of Oluti. The southern section of Satellite Town contains hotels which sit adjacent to Badagry Creek.
- Trade Fair Complex - The Trade Fair neighborhood of Satellite Town is a massive commercial and logistics corridor centered around the Lagos Trade Fair Complex, serving as a primary West African hub for the wholesale of auto parts, jewelry, and machinery. It is a high-traffic zone where the energy of international commerce meets the residential quiet of Satellite Town, creating a unique environment dominated by sprawling markets and heavy transit activity along the Lagos-Badagry Expressway.

== See also ==
- Awori District settlements
