= Eko Bridge =

Bridge in Nigeria

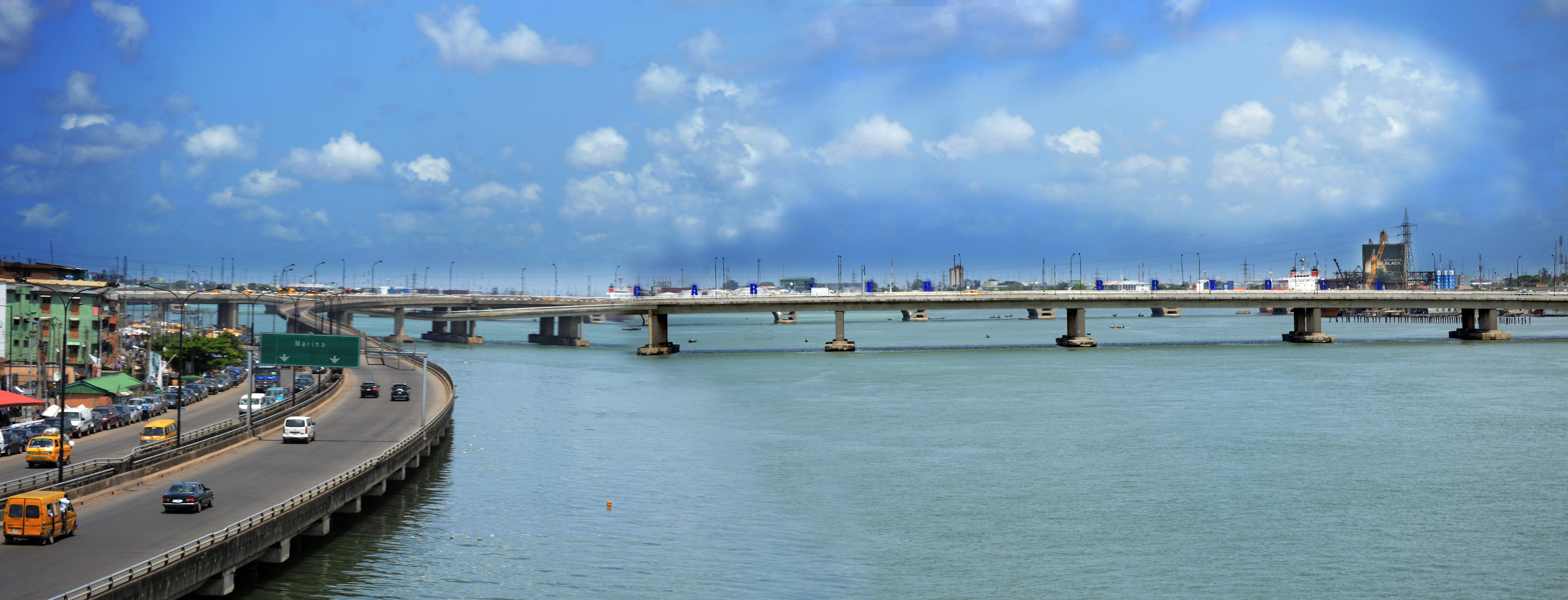
- Coordinates: 6°27′54″N 3°22′53″E
- Carries: Vehicular traffic
- Crosses: Lagos Lagoon (connects Lagos Island to the Mainland)
- Locale: Lagos, Lagos State, Nigeria

Statistics
- Toll: No

Location
- Interactive map of Eko Bridge

Eko Bridge is one of three bridges connecting Lagos Island to the mainland, the others being the Third Mainland and Carter bridges. The bridge was built in 1975 and is the shortest of the three bridges linking Lagos Island to mainland.

It was the first major project undertaken by Julius Berger which was approved by Shehu Shagari who was then the Minister of Works during Nigeria's First Republic.

The bridge spans from Ijora on the mainland to the Apongbon area of Lagos Island, with the lagoon section stretching 430 metres (1,410 ft). The bridge and its 1,350-metre (4,430 ft) landward extension were constructed in phases between 1965 and 1975. It serves as the primary access point for vehicles entering Lagos Island from Apapa and Surulere areas of Lagos.

The bridge was built by Julius Berger Nigeria PLC.

The first phase rehabilitation plan commenced from 23 August 2014 to 27 October 2014 which lasted for 71 days. The state government announced that the rehabilitation would not necessitate its total closure rather the bridge would be rehabilitated in phase. The bridge was partially shut for rehabilitation on 4 July 2020. The Federal Ministry of Works, Nigeria, rehabilitated the second phase of the bridge from 23 October till 9 November 2021.

The second phase of the rehabilitation was officially announced by the state government to commence on Saturday October 23 to November 9, 2021, by the Federal Ministry of Works. According to the report, the work will commence along Alaka-Apongbon area of the state.
