= Port of Port Harcourt =

- Interactive map of Port of Port Harcourt

Location
- Country: Nigeria
- Location: Port Harcourt
- Coordinates: 4°46′9″N 7°0′18″E
- UN/LOCODE: NGPHC

Details
- Opened: 1913
- Operated by: Nigerian Ports Authority
- Type of harbour: Natural

The Port of Port Harcourt also called PH Port, is a port complex located in Port Harcourt, Rivers State, Nigeria. The Port first opened in 1913 and can cater to virtually all types of cargo.
