= Nigerian Ports Authority =

Nigerian government agency

- Abbreviation: NPA
- Formation: 1954; 72 years ago
- Purpose: Regulate the ports industry of Nigeria
- Headquarters: Nigerian Ports Authority, 26/28 Marina, Lagos.
- Official language: English
- Managing Director: Abubakar Dantsoho
- Board Chairman: Adedayo Clement Adeyeye
- Website: nigerianports.gov.ng

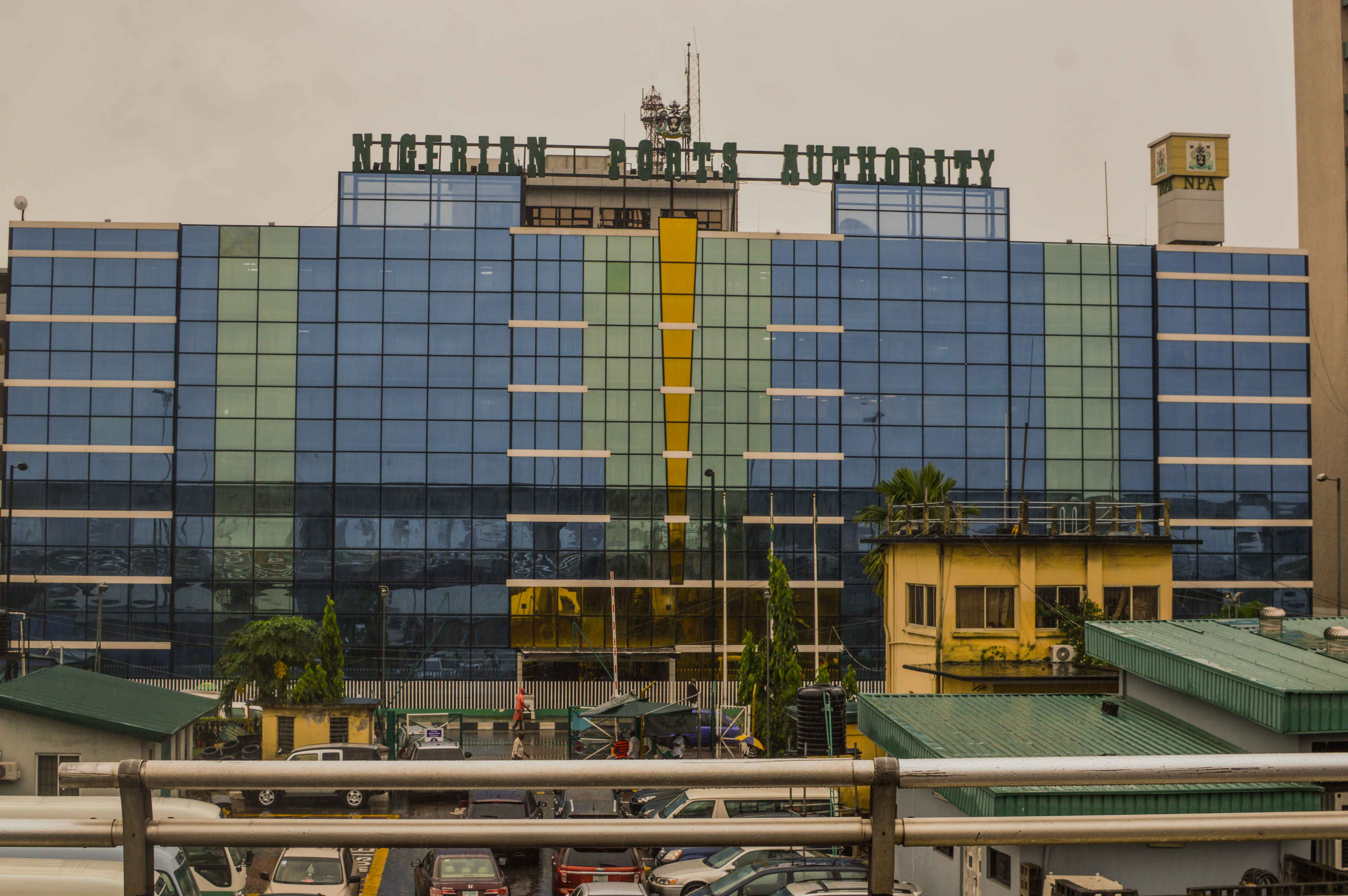
Nigerian ports authority, CMS

The Nigerian Ports Authority (NPA) is a federal government agency that governs and operates the ports of Nigeria. The major ports controlled by the NPA include: the Lagos Port Complex and Tin Can Island Port in Lagos; Calabar Port, Delta Port, Rivers Port at Port Harcourt, and Onne Port. Operations of the NPA are carried out in affiliation with the Presidency of (Nigeria) and the Nigerian Shippers' Council. The Head office of the Nigerian Ports Authority is located in Marina, Lagos.

However, with the concessioning programme of the federal government, which is aimed at promoting efficiency through, public and private partnership, the Nigerian Ports, has since 2005, being concessioned.

This landlord arrangement, as they call it, has fostered better relationships and high turnover of goods and services in and around the Nigerian Port system either in the Eastern or the ever-busy Western zone.

== History ==
Flag of the Nigerian Ports Authority (1955–1960)

The Nigerian Ports Authority started operating in April 1955 following the implementation of the Ports Act of 1954. In the beginning, the public corporation managed only the Lagos and Port Harcourt ports while some private companies managed the remaining Nigerian ports. In addition to managing cargo handling, quay and berthing facilities at the Lagos and Port Harcourt ports, the initial law also gave it the responsibility of managing harbours and approaches to all ports in the country. By 1963 the firm had grown successfully, it was operating a cargo ship from Lagos to Port Harcourt and also began dredging the Bonny terminal for oil operations. In the same year, the firm issued a £4.3 million loan stock in London.

From 1962 - 1968, under the Nigerian Development plan, the length of the quays was expanded and additional warehouses and cargo handling equipment were added. During the Nigerian Civil War that lasted from 1967-1969, only the Lagos Port was functioning and some parts of the port in Port Harcourt was damaged. In 1969, a new decree added Burutu, Calabar and Warri ports to its jurisdiction. The firm took control of the Warri port from John Holt and Burutu from UAC. However, by the early 1970s, the Lagos port was battling congestion. In 1973, the corporation entered into an agreement with the World Bank to finance expansion of facilities within the ports.

=== Cement armada ===
In 1974, the Nigerian Ministry of Defense began a program of building various barracks to house almost all of its soldiers. Towards the end of the year, the Ministry began a process of issuing offers to various companies for cement delivery. Though less than 3 million tonnes of cement was needed yearly, the ministry ended up offering letters of delivery for 16 million tonnes to be delivered within a year. Other government agencies such as the Federal Housing Authority and the Nigerian National Supply Company also ordered about 4 million tonnes of cement to be delivered within a year. By the end of November 1974 to late 1975, about 400 cement ships berthed at the Lagos port leading to unprecedented congestion and increasing the turn around time of hundreds of ships to 180 days.

=== Expansion ===
NPA accelerated the expansion of port facilities after the end of the cement armada. The government spent over 190 million naira to complete the Tin Can Island port with two roll on roll off facilities. It built a third wharf in Apapa and expanded facilities at the Warri and Calabar ports. It also constructed three lighter terminals in Kiri Kiri, Onne and Ikorodu.

== Concessioning ==
During the administration of Olusegun Obasanjo, a ports reform program was put in place to reduce inefficiency at the ports. The result was the concessioning of about 24 terminals to private operators for a certain period of time. NPA will continue to act as the landlord and provide common user facilities, technical oversight and other marine services. The private operators will be involved in loading and offloading of cargoes.

== Facilities ==
=== Lagos Port Complex ===
This is the Apapa port in Lagos. Together with the Tin Can Island Port, it serves mainly Lagos and western Nigeria. The Lagos Port Complex sees as the major economic door to the nation.

=== Tin Can Island Port ===
Tin Can Island Port at Lagos was hastily constructed in 1976 to ameliorate the problems of the 1975 'cement armada' crisis. It was commissioned on 14 October 1977 at a total cost of N200 million and comprised 10 berths and 2.5 kilometres of hard quay.

=== Calabar Port ===
Located in the southeast corner of the country in Cross River State, Calabar is the home of the Eastern Naval Command of the Nigerian Navy. This is the longest serving port and also the oldest seaport in Nigeria. Port facilities are located 55 nautical miles up the Calabar River.

=== Delta Port ===
Delta Port, Rivers Port and Onne Port are located in the petroleum and natural gas producing Niger River Delta region of Nigeria. Delta Port in Delta State includes the ports of Warri, Burutu, Sapele and petroleum terminals at Escravos and Forcados.

=== Rivers Port/Port Harcourt ===
The Rivers Port Complex in coastal Rivers State comprises Port of Port Harcourt, Okrika Refined Petroleum Oil Jetty, Haastrup/Eagle Bulk Cement Jetty, Kidney Island Jetty, Ibeto Jetty, Macobar Jetty and Bitumen Jetty. Management of port operations at Port Harcourt itself has been commissioned out to two port operators, Ports and Terminal Operators and BUA Ports and Terminal, it is not operated by the NPA. Like Delta State, Rivers State is a principal petroleum-producing region of Nigeria.

=== Onne Port ===
Onne is located in Rivers State on Ngololo Creek near the Bonny River, 19 km from Port Harcourt; the port area is located in Eleme Local Government Area (Eleme LGA) of Rivers State. The port consists of two major facilities, the Federal Ocean Terminal and the Federal Lighter Terminal. Onne Port has been designated as an Oil and Gas Free Zone by the government of Nigeria; currently over 100 companies have licenses to work at Onne Port; as an economic free zone it serves as a hub port for oil and gas operations throughout West Africa and Central Africa.

== See also ==
- Transport in Nigeria
- Nigerian Maritime Administration and Safety Agency
