= German School Abuja =

- German: Deutsche Schule Abuja
- Abuja; Nigeria

Information
- School type: International school
- Classes: Kindergarten - Class 5
- Language: German; English
- Affiliation: Julius Berger
- Website: www.dsa-nigeria.com

German School Abuja (German: Deutsche Schule Abuja) is a German international school located on the grounds of the Julius Berger Life Camp in Gwarinpa, Abuja, Nigeria. Its classes go from kindergarten to class 5. The construction company Julius Berger Nigeria PLC operates the school.

Like many German international schools, the Abuja school is smaller than other international schools in the area because it targets German citizens and native speakers of German, and it only accepts small numbers of students who do not natively speak German. It was scheduled to begin offering an English language stream in 2017.
