= Apapa Amusement Park =

Theme park in Lagos, Nigeria

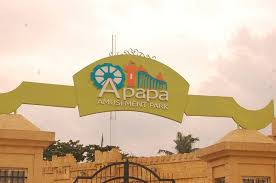
- Gate's entrance
- Interactive map of Apapa Amusement Park
- Location: Apapa, Lagos, Nigeria
- Coordinates: 6.4438°N 3.3665°E
- Status: Operating
- Owner: Partnership between Lagos State Government and Crystal cubes construction
- Area: 3.1 ha (37,000 yd^{2})

The Apapa Amusement Park is an amusement park in Lagos, Nigeria. The park was built in 2008 and it spans an area of approximately 3.1 ha (37,000 yd^{2}). The park reopened after a three-year closure due to environmental and security reasons, and after a complete makeover in 2015. It is a partnership arrangement between the Lagos State government and a private company, Crystal Cubes Construction Company, which is managed by Mr. Rabih Jaafar. The Apapa Amusement Park commenced operation in 1976 under the Lagos Lunar Park, which was jointly owned by the Lagos Island Council, the Lagos Mainland Council, and Improjex, a company based in Switzerland that was responsible for managing and maintaining the park. Here are compiled list of games offered at the Amusement Park.

The rejuvenated Apapa amusement park is a stunning work of art, guests confess to the feeling of being in a foreign country at first sight.The structures are built in Arabian style architecture, a reminiscent of Dubai's Jumeirah and feature similar elements, including flat rooftops adorned with horns, dark yellow hues, and rough-hewn walls. The Apapa amusement park was returned to its full functionality state after it collapsed by the Governor Fashola led administration in 2013 to help improve tourism in the state. The park is filled with so many facilities which aims at making sure everyone has a good time. Entering the Apapa amusement park is free as there is no gate fee charged.

== Environment and climate ==
In 2012, the Apapa Amusement Park was demolished, with many buildings and shops within the park's environment also demolished. This was largely due to environmental concerns and the need to improve the environment. The demolition of buildings within the Apapa environment created room for more structures to be erected so as to revive the park for leisure and tourism. In 2016, the park was officially re-opened after some maintenance was carried out in the park
