= Third Mainland Bridge =

Bridge linking Lagos Island to the mainland in Nigeria

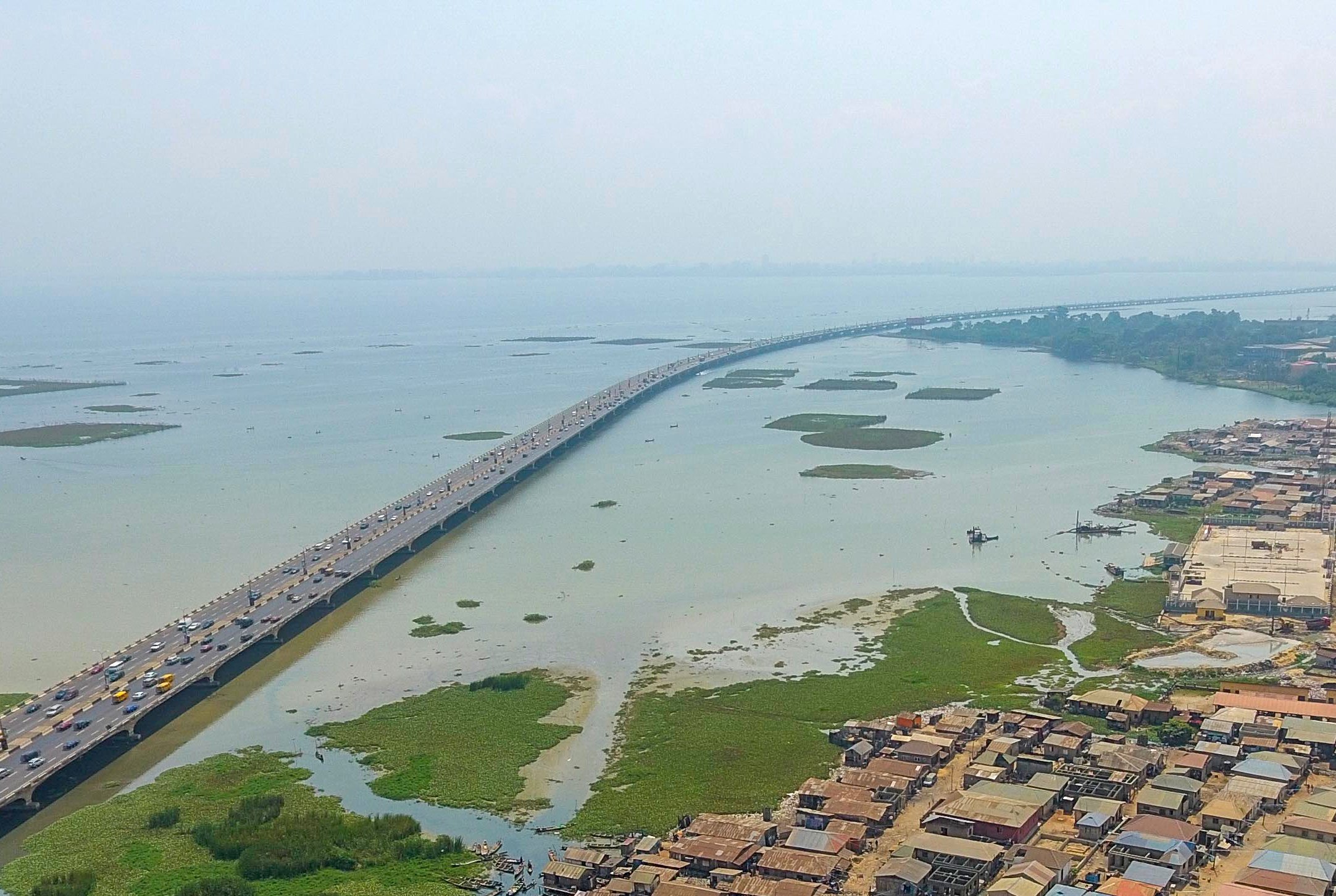
- Coordinates: 6°30′00″N 3°24′05″E
- Carries: Vehicular Traffic
- Crosses: Lagos Lagoon (connects Lagos Island to Lagos Mainland)
- Locale: Lagos, Lagos State, Nigeria
- Official name: Ibrahim Babangida Bridge

Characteristics
- Total length: 11.8 km (7.3 mi)

History
- Constructed by: Julius Berger, PGH Venture
- Opened: 1990; 36 years ago

Statistics
- Daily traffic: Moderate
- Toll: No

Location
- Interactive map of Third Mainland Bridge

Third Mainland Bridge is the longest of three bridges connecting Lagos Island to the mainland, the others are the Eko and Carter bridges. It was the longest bridge in Africa until 1996 when the 6th October Bridge located in Cairo was completed. The bridge starts from Oworonshoki which is linked to the Lagos–Ibadan Expressway and Oshodi–Apapa Expressway, and ends at the Adeniji Adele Interchange on Lagos Island. There is also a link midway through the bridge that leads to Herbert Macaulay Way, Yaba. The bridge was built by Julius Berger Nigeria PLC. The phase one of the project was commissioned by President Shehu Shagari (1925–2018) in 1980 and completed by President Ibrahim Babangida in 1990; it measures about 11.8 km in length.

By 2006, many commuters had reported that the Third Mainland Bridge was vibrating noticeably, indicating that it needed urgent attention. As a result, remedial work was commenced on portions of the bridge at different times, leading to intermittent partial closure of the bridge. In January 2013, this work was completed.

Recently, there have been rumours of cracks on the bridge. This, however, was denied by authorities. The eight-lane bridge experienced a new look during the last repairing exercise, painting the bridge guide with the colours of Nigeria: green, white, green, and also general painting was done out for a new look. The repair works on the bridge were completed and the bridge was reopened on 30 October 2012.

The Third Mainland Bridge has very high vehicular traffic on weekdays, as many residents commute to and from the Lagos Mainland to the Island, which is the commercial hub of Lagos State. Residents in Ikeja, Agboyi-Ketu, Ikorodu, Oworonshoki, Gbagada, Yaba, Surulere, Maryland and Oshodi often use the bridge on their daily commutes. The Third Mainland Bridge is an essential part of Lagos' daily commuting, and as such requires to be constantly renovated. It has also come to be a major Lagos icon, offering different views of Lagos—the Lagos Lagoon, the University of Lagos waterfront, the National Theatre and Makoko, a shanty town built on the Lagos Lagoon.

On 6 July 2020, it was announced that the Third Mainland Bridge will be closed for six months due to repairs. The bridge was to undergo another round of repairs from Friday, 24 July 2020, to 24 January 2021, for the replacement of bearings and worn-out expansion joints.

On 4 January 2024, The Lagos State Government announces date to close Third Mainland Bridge for complete repairs. Each phase lasted for six weeks. On 4 April 2024, the Federal Government of Nigeria reopened the Third Mainland Bridge.

== Construction ==
In the 1970s, following the end of Nigeria's civil war, a period of increasing oil price followed and Nigeria went through series of economic upturns. A need for improved infrastructural facilities especially in the capital city of Lagos that had gone through a period of port congestion and then an upward tick in vehicular traffic created the impetus for a third bridge linking the commercial-oriented Lagos Island with the growing urban settlements of mainland Lagos.

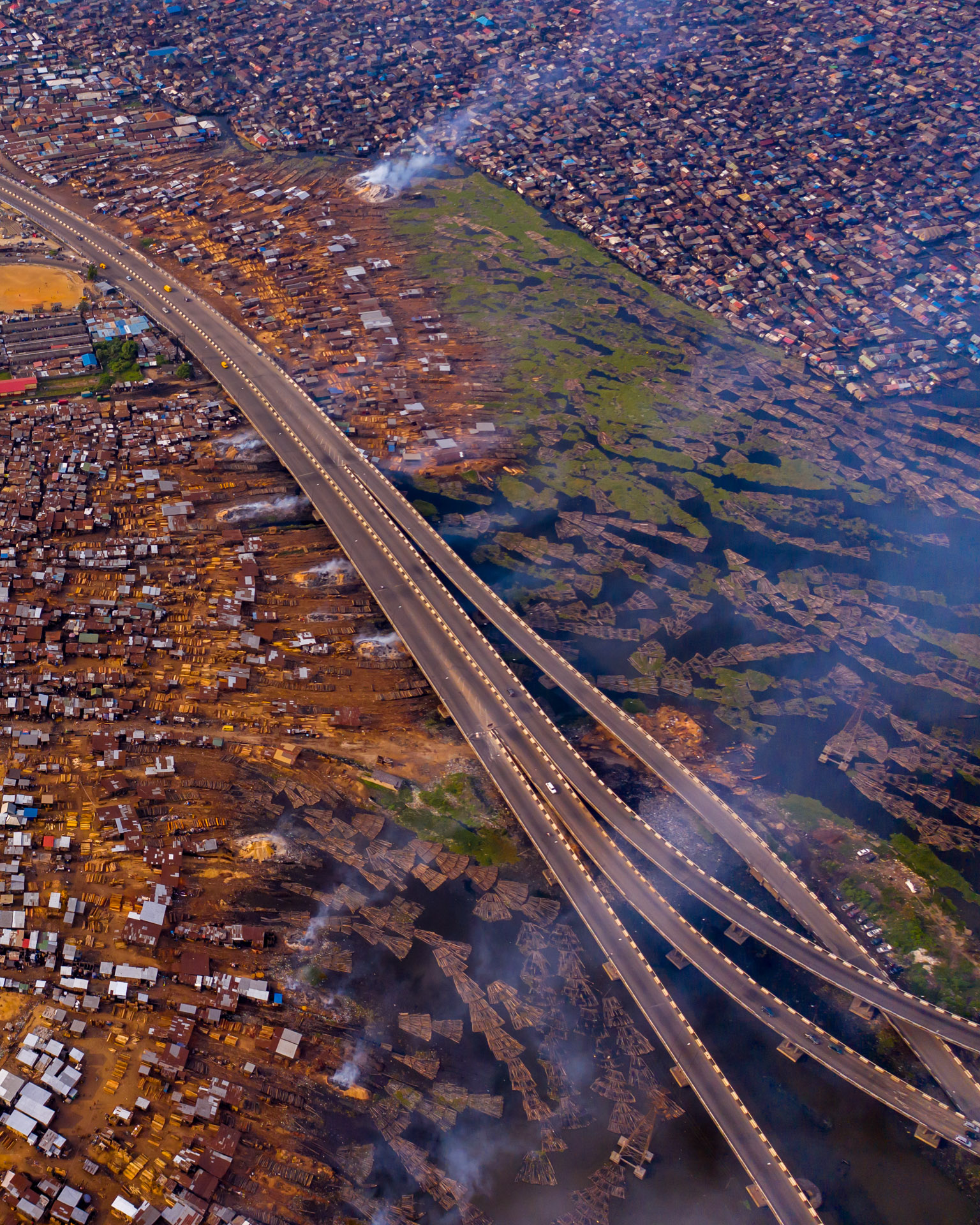
The Third Mainland Bridge cutting through neighborhoods burning refuse near the highway. Both the highway and the burning trash cause air pollution that harms the communities near the highway.

A contract was awarded for a third mainland bridge in 1976. Construction of the bridge was done in phases. The first phase was contracted to a PGH consortium, a venture consisting, Impressit Girola and Borini Prono, while Trevi Group provided support services for piling. The first phase was designed to be 5 kilometres (3.1 mi) in length, starting from the Island and ending at Ebute Metta, towards Yaba. The bridge elevates to 3 kilometres (1.9 mi) above the water and made from pre-stressed reinforced concrete. Foundation piles had varying depths of between 36 and 54 m (118 and 177 ft) and pile diameter is based on potential carrying road, diameters of 1,500 mm (1.6 yd) are used for the main bridge crossing the Lagos lagoon and for the slipway and approach roads, pile diameter was between 800 mm (0.87 yd) and 1,200 mm (1.3 yd). The first phase was completed in 1980.

The second phase from Ebute-Metta to Oworonshoki was awarded to Julius Berger in Nigeria.
