= Pius Ukeyima Akutah =

Nigerian lawyer

Pius Ukeyima Akutah MON

Executive Secretary and Chief Executive Officer of the Nigerian Shippers' Council
- Incumbent
- Assumed office 25 October 2023
- Preceded by: Emmanuel Jime

Personal details
- Born: 7 June 1970 (age 56) Nigeria
- Party: All Progressives Congress
- Spouse: Mrs. Patricia Obehi Pius Ukeyima
- Education: Ph.D. in International Cooperation in Criminal Matters
- Alma mater: Nasarawa State University; University of Abuja; University of Jos
- Occupation: Legal Practitioner, Public Servant and Politician

Dr. Pius Ukeyima Akutah MON (born June 7, 1970) is a Nigerian legal practitioner and public servant. He serves as the Executive Secretary/Chief Executive Officer (ES/CEO) of the Nigerian Shippers' Council, an appointment he assumed on October 25, 2023, succeeding Emmanuel Jime. He officially commenced his duties at the council's headquarters in Lagos on November 1, 2023.

Upon assuming office at the Nigerian Shippers Council, Akutah stated his intention to build on the foundation laid by his predecessors. The council has taken steps to activate the cargo tracking note, promote port efficiency with the stated goal of reducing cargo clearance time from 48 hours to 24 hours, and introduce an electronic traffic system.

The Nigerian Shippers Council has highlighted the implementation of payment processes transitioning from manual to automated systems within the council. It has also emphasized the benefits of registration to enhance a database of port service providers and users, as well as a "know your customers" policy.

== Early life and education ==
Akutah was born in Ushongo Local Government Area of Benue State, Nigeria. He obtained a Diploma in Law from the University of Jos. He earned a Bachelor of Laws (LLB) degree from the University of Abuja in 2006. He later attended the Nigerian Law School in Bwari, Abuja, and was called to the Nigerian Bar as a Barrister at Law (BL) in May 2007. Subsequently, he obtained a Master of Laws (LL.M) degree in Public International Law from Ahmadu Bello University, Zaria, in 2016. On December 10, 2024, he earned a Ph.D. in International Cooperation in Criminal Matters at Nasarawa State University, Keffi.

Akutah is an alumnus of the United States Department of State's International Visitor's Leadership Program (IVLP) Washington, 2013 and attended the U.S. Department of State's International Law Enforcement Academy (ILEA), Roswell, New Mexico, 2018 He is also a chartered Mobile and Computer Forensics Examiner.

== Career ==
Akutah's career has involved international legal cooperation and maritime governance. His background includes work in extradition, Mutual Legal Assistance (MLA), and international treaty negotiation. His current role involves aligning Nigeria's shipping practices with global standards.

Before assuming his role at the Nigerian Shippers' Council, Akutah held positions within the Nigerian legal system, with service in international cooperation in criminal matters spanning over two decades. He served as Assistant Director and Head of the Central Authority Unit of the International Cooperation Department under the Office of The Honourable Attorney-General of the Federation (AGF) and Minister of Justice.

In this capacity, he led Nigeria's efforts on Mutual Legal Assistance (MLA) and Extradition law. He participated in the negotiation and execution of international legal cooperation with various countries, including the United States, United Kingdom, Canada, South Africa, and Ghana. His responsibilities included coordinating international criminal prosecutions, overseeing treaty negotiations, and managing MLA requests and extradition proceedings. He was involved in the prosecution of criminal cases, including the extradition of fugitives to countries such as the United Kingdom and the United States of America. In 2022, he concluded an extradition case at the Supreme Court of Nigeria. In August 2023, he oversaw the extradition of two suspects involved in cybercrime, specifically "sextortion," to face trial in the US.

Akutah contributed to the negotiation of Bilateral Agreements between Nigeria and other nations concerning Mutual Legal Assistance and Extradition in November 2023. He reviewed and endorsed the Administration of Criminal Justice Act (ACJA), encouraging its adoption by Nigerian states. He also authored legal opinions on the use of United Nations Treaties.

Akutah is a faculty member with the United Nations Office on Drugs and Crime (UNODC) and the Commonwealth Secretariat. In these roles, he has trained prosecutors, judges, and law enforcement officials on applying international conventions in combating transnational organized crime. He has taught International Cooperation in Criminal Matters in various countries. He is a Fellow of the Chartered Institute of Logistics and Transport (FCILT) and a Fellow of the Institute of Transport Administration (FInstTA).

== Community service ==
In 2020, Akutah initiated a peace effort by drilling two boreholes separately at Tse-Yagba, Mkem, Tsambe, and another in Tse Yua in Mbaikyume, Mbagwaza district. This effort aimed to resolve conflicts between the border communities of Tsambe in Vandeikya and Mbagwaza in Ushongo Local Government Areas.

In 2019, Akutah donated a furnished house to a centenarian in Mbagwaza, Ushongo Local Government Area of Benue State who had been living in a dilapidated thatched hut.

He has initiated and supported development projects in his native Benue State, and his work includes youth mentorship and grassroots empowerment.

== Awards and recognition ==
Akutah is a recipient of the 2017 Presidential Civil Service Merit Award (PCSMA). He was conferred with the National Honour of Member of the Order of the Niger (MON) by President Muhammadu Buhari in 2022.

President Faure Gnassingbe of Togo presented him with the Presidential Merit Award of excellent service for contributions in the drafting and presentation of the African Charter for Maritime Safety and Security. In 2024, he was named “Regulator of the Year” by a leading industry publication.

== Politics ==
Akutah is a politician and a member of the All Progressives Congress (APC). In 2019, he contested for the House of Representative election in the Kwande-Ushongo Federal Constituency. He also contested for the 2023 Gubernatorial election within the same party but stepped down for Rev. Hyacinth Alia, who is the incumbent Governor.
