= Apapa Port Complex =

Port complex in Nigeria

Apapa Port Complex also known as the Lagos Port Complex is Nigeria's largest and busiest port complex. The complex consist of a number of facilities including Apapa quays, Third Apapa Wharf Extension, Apapa Dockyard, Apapa Petroleum Wharf, Bulk Vegetable Oil Wharf, Ijora Wharf, Kirikiri Lighter Terminal, and Lily pond inland container terminal. Financed and built by the colonial government of Nigeria, It became the nation's busiest port for exporting agricultural produce from the provinces of Western and Northern Nigeria in the late 1920s. Administration was transferred to the Nigerian government upon the granting of self-government and In 2005, the complex was divided into terminals and contracted out to private operators with NPA acting as the landlord and regulator.

== History ==
A major factor that led to the creation of Apapa Port Complex was the completion of the Western railway with Lagos and coastal Yorubaland as the main terminus, thereafter, a need arose for a facility to load and discharge goods in either direction of Western Nigeria and the Northern provinces. But at the time, much of the natural harbours within Lagos used for trading for decades by the local Yoruba population were not conducive for modern ships due to the presence of a natural sandbar and heavy tides, this barrier sometimes caused goods to Lagos to be diverted to the calmer entrance of Forcados. In 1906, a large capital expenditure was budgeted for the dredging of Lagos harbor and the construction of two stone moles to facilitate access to ocean going vessels, in 1913, the engineering works were completed and ocean going shipping vessels had access to the Lagos harbour. In 1919, a 180-foot wharf was extended to Apapa, a location that had been decided will be the terminus for the Western railway. In 1926, following the completion of four berths totaling 1,800 ft in length, Apapa began to dominate the other wharves at Iddo and Lagos Island otherwise as Customs wharf in the shipment of export goods. Between 1928 and 1929, it handled 201,307 tonnes of exports goods, and between 1937 and 1938, Apapa wharf handled about 370,000 tonnes of cargo, in 1953, it handled close to 700,000 tonnes. After the end of World War II, additional engineering works led to the reclamation of land for ground facilities such as passenger terminals, cargo sheds and custom facilities. During this period, control of the port complex was diffused, the Marine department was in charge of maintaining passage, storage and berthing of ships, private shipping firms performed lightering services while the railway corporation also performed port operations at its terminus.

The rise of movement of goods by road put a strain on the existing road infrastructure and a new outlet was constructed to link Apapa through Mushin to Ibadan and further up-north.

Beginning in 1956, the newly formed NPA began to expand the number of berths within the complex, adding an additional six berthing space. This extension of the wharf was completed in 1961. A second extension was completed during the first national development plan between 1962 and 1968. The increased space caused the port to further lead in cargo handling and by the end of 1966, it handled a cargo load of 1.9 million tonnes. After the second extension, the land area of the wharf was about 100 hectares with the ability to handle twenty loading or discharging vessels at a time. A third extension along the Badagry creek was completed in 1979. The authorities created facilities for loading and discharging bulk cement and grains.

== Today ==
The Nigerian Ports Authority owned and administered operations in Lagos Port Complex from 1956 until it was concessioned in 2005. During this period most of the services within the port were performed by NPA with the exception of stevedoring and manufacturing. In 2005, the complex was divided into multiple terminals and sold to private operators to manage for a set number of years.

Terminal	Berths	Private operator
Apapa Terminal A	1-3	Apapa Bulk Terminal Ltd (Flour Mills)
Apapa Terminal B	4-5	Apapa Bulk Terminal Ltd (Flour Mills)
Apapa Terminal C	6-12	ENL Consortium Ltd
Apapa Terminal D	13	ENL Consortium Ltd
Apapa Terminal E	19-20	Green View Development Nigeria Ltd (Dangote)
Apapa container terminal	15-18A	APM Terminals Ltd
Ijora/Lily pond container terminal	-	Maersk

The port covers more than 80 hectares and has a four-wheeled gate with a height of eight metres for receiving oversized cargoes. It has two logistics centres that include bonded warehouses and terminal buildings. There are five private terminals in the Lagos Port Complex. These specialised facilities have more than 10 berths for handling grain, machinery, construction materials and perishables such as food, minerals, fertilisers, flour, salt, sugar, etc. Two grain mills and a processing plant are located on the port premises near the bulk terminals. Crude oil and petroleum products are handled at the eight jetties. The port has four jetties for handling fishing boats. Coal is handled at the 150m Ijora facility. Lagos Port also has four tank farms for the storage of refined petroleum products.

The port's container terminal covers an area of 55 hectares and has a total quay length of 1,005 metres. It has an annual container capacity of over 1,000,000 TEU and 298 reefer connections. 13 mobile harbour cranes and 14 rubber-tyred cranes are used for loading and unloading. The storage areas include 3 warehouses with an area of 3,025 m^{2} and an unpaved open yard for temporary storage of goods. The port, operated by APM Terminals, has implemented electronic procedures such as fixed berth windows, real-time transparency of transactions, performance reviews, technical assistance, real-time invoicing and container tracking.

=== Traffic ===
When the deep water berths of Apapa quays was completed in 1926, it was envisioned that a large amount of traffic would be by rail. However, as the port grew and trucks became the preferred means of transporting goods to and from the port, traffic gridlock caused by trucks parking on the roadside became a regular occurrence.
