= Oshodi–Apapa Expressway =

Expressway in Nigeria

Route information
- Existed: 1975–present
- History: Completed 2021

Location
- Country: Nigeria
- States: Lagos State, Lagos

Highway system
- Transport in Nigeria

The Oshodi-Apapa Expressway was constructed between 1975 and 1978 as a major route to Tincan and Apapa Port and also as a major route into the country from Murtala Mohammed International Airport. As a result of neglect and the age of the expressway, it, however, virtually collapsed, causing the drainage system to also collapse completely.

== Reconstruction ==
The Goodluck Jonathan led administration approved contracts for the reconstruction of the Oshodi–Apapa Expressway in August 2013. The contract for the Oshodi–Apapa Expressway was granted to Julius Berger Nigeria PLC for N15 million and a 15-month completion term. After the 2015 general elections, however, work on the road came to a halt. The Dangote Group advocated the Buhari-led Government in 2017 that the Oshodi–Apapa Expressway be repaired. The Dangote Group's proposal included various places such as road rehabilitation beginning at Creek Road, Liverpool, Tin Can, and continuing all the way to Marine Beach, Mile 2 to Oshodi, Oworonshoki, and the Toll Gate. on the Ibadan-Lagos expressway.

The contract for the rehabilitation of the road from Apapa to the toll gate on the Lagos-Ibadan expressway in Lagos state was approved by the Buhari administration in July 2018. The reconstruction project was however awarded to Dangote Group, in addition, the government would grant the Dangote group a three-year tax exception. In 2018, the Federal Executive council approves N72.9bn for the reconstruction of Oshodi Apapa expressway road in Lagos.

The project was awarded to Hitech Construction Company Ltd, an indigenous construction business, which began work on the Oshodi–Apapa Expressway rehabilitation in April 2019.

The project is expected to be completed in two years from the start date, but the Federal Government stated in April 2021 that the Oshodi–Apapa Expressway is virtually ready for usage.
