= Tin Can Island Port =

- Interactive map of Tin Can Island Port

Location
- Country: Nigeria
- Location: Apapa, Lagos, Lagos State

Details
- Opened: 1977 (founded), 2006 (merged)
- Operated by: Nigeria Port Authority; Port and Terminal Multiservices Limited

Tin Can Island Port (TCIP) is located in Apapa, the port for the city of Lagos. Tin Can Island Port is located on an eponymous island, seven kilometers due west of the center of Lagos across Lagos Harbor.

Tin Can Island Port was begun in 1976 and opened in 1977. In 1991, the Nigerian Ports Authority became responsible for operating the port. The Roro Terminal was designated as part of the new Tin Can Island Port in 1977. Tin Can Island merged with Roro port in 2006 when private terminal operators, Port and Terminal Multiservices Ltd. (PTML) took over the terminals. Since then, PTML has made efforts to redevelop the terminals.

Tin Can Island Port is the second busiest Port in Nigeria after Apapa Port.

The storage capacity of the silos is 28,000 metric tonnes of grain which is transported by Fleetwood Transportation. The terminal handles wheat, maize and malt and can take delivery of about 4000 metric tonnes of grain daily. The port facilities can handle ships of about 30,000 tonnes. There is also a grain bagging facility on-site.

The port covers 79 hectares (200 acres) of land on Tin Can Island and provides bunkering and ship repair services for vessels with a maximum weight of 35,000 DWT. Fresh water is available at all berths through underground wells drilled to a water depth of 250 metres (270 yd; 820 ft). In 2006, the Tin Can Island Port Complex was created by merging the former RORO Port and Tin Can Island Port. Its capacity was further increased with the opening of the new container terminal.

Tin Can Island Port handles various types of cargo including liquid bulk, dry cargo, containerised cargo, RORO and breakbulk at its 12 berths with a length of 1,358 metres (4,455 ft; 1,485 yd) and a longitudinal depth of 7 to 11 metres (23 to 36 ft; 7.7 to 12.0 yd), which can accommodate vessels with a maximum length of 260 metres (850 ft; 280 yd). The Kiri Kiri Lighter Terminal has two berths with a length of 700 metres (2,300 ft; 770 yd) and a water depth of 4.5 metres (15 ft; 4.9 yd). It also offers 24-hour pilotage services and a fast turnaround time for vessels. The security of the port is ensured by regular patrols by the Marine Police and the Nigerian Navy at the anchorages, oil jetties and buoys.

The main storage terminal has one of the largest grain silos with a capacity of 28,000 tonnes. The grain terminal handles wheat, corn, malt and barley and transports 4,000 tonnes of grain daily. It can accommodate ships weighing around 30,000 tonnes (30,000 long tons; 33,000 short tons) and has a facility for packing grain. The terminal, which employs around 700 people, has undergone significant infrastructural development. It is also directly connected to major highways and industrial centres.

The terminal covers 60 hectares (150 acres), including a 25-hectare container yard. The total length of the berths is 770 metres (2,530 ft; 840 yd) with a longitudinal depth of 13 metres (43 ft; 14 yd). The annual storage capacity is around 20,000 TEU and the terminal has been designed to handle 650,000 TEU annually. Fully functional port equipment facilitates port operations. The Tin Can Container Terminal has 8 mobile cranes, 15 rubber-tyred gantry cranes, 14 reach stackers, 6 empties handlers, 4 forklifts and 45-yard trailers. The terminal has 250 reefer connections and also offers container stowage and de-stowage services.
