= Lagos–Badagry Expressway =

Expressway in Nigeria

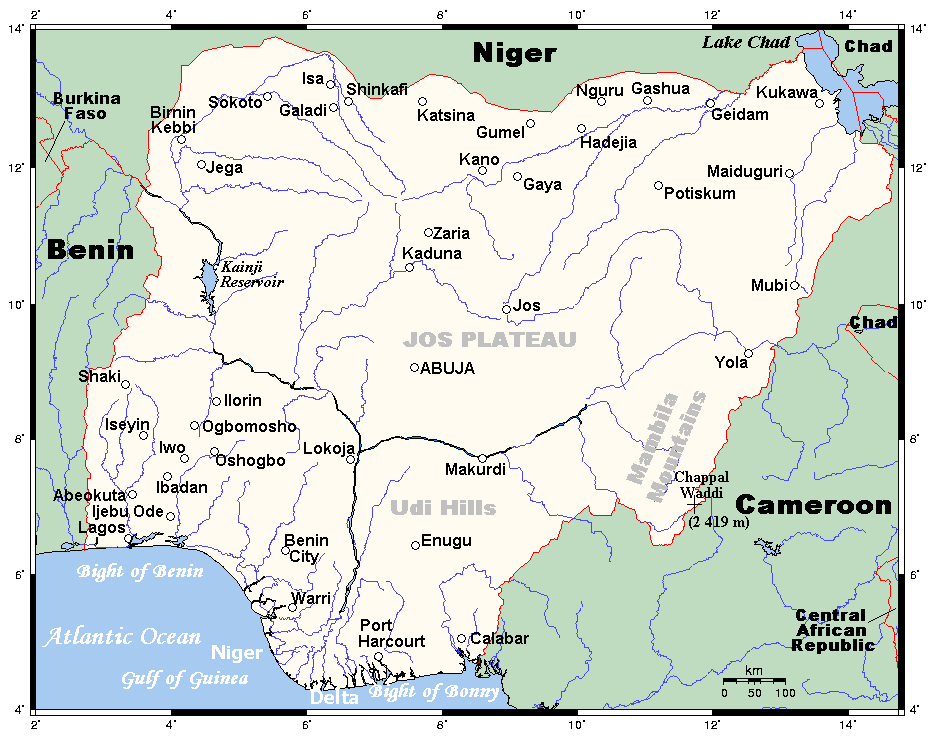

Route information
- History: Under Construction

Major junctions
- East end: Lagos
- West end: Badagry

Location
- Country: Nigeria
- States: Badagry, Lagos, Lagos State
- Major cities: Badagry, Lagos

Highway system
- Transport in Nigeria

The Lagos–Badagry Expressway is the local name for the Nigerian section of the Trans–West African Coastal Highway. The expressway connects Lagos, Nigeria with Dakar, Senegal.

Extensive reconstruction of the Lagos portion of the expressway began in 2010. When those renovations are completed the Lagos portion of the expressway will be widened from four lanes to ten lanes for road vehicles and a new mass transit line will operate in the median. Two of the expressway's lanes are intended to be exclusively used by the Lagos Bus Rapid Transit System.
