= Lagos State Transport Corporation =

Lagos State Transport Corporation also known as LSTC was a state owned public transport service that operated from 1958 up to the early 1990s. At its peak which was during the years preceding the Nigerian Second Republic, LSTC provided extensive bus coverage within the commercial city of Lagos.

The main equipment of the corporation was the Mercedes chassis and models 1313 and 1617.

== History ==
=== Municipal transport service ===
In 1958, Lagos Town Council acquired the Zarpas bus service which was operating thirty route permits and 47 buses, the service was licensed to operate in the suburbs of Obalende, Yaba, Apapa, Idi-Oro, Mushin and Ikoyi. The acquired operation was named Lagos Municipal Transport Service and it became the first government owned public bus service in Lagos State. In the late 1950s, this service competed with four licensed operators, in this group included Benson bus services and Oshinowo Transport. When the Lagos Town Council became the Lagos City Council, the municipal service was renamed Lagos City Transport Service. One of the council members, Julius Adeola Odeku was appointed chairman of the newly incorporated company.

The outward growth in demography from Lagos Island and its environs towards the mainland caused an increased demand for commuting that LSTC was unable to satisfy. Additional operators were allowed to complement the public bus operation leading to the entry of licensed companies operating adapted or unconventional vehicles such as Molue, a lorry chassis, Bolekaja known also as mammy wagon and Kiakia/danfo, which are minibuses. The operators were given permit to operate specific inward and outward routes usually between Iddo, Lagos and Lagos Mainland. Many of the companies went into business with used lorries and buses of varying quality and with speed as a key strategy causing a perception of a bus service bordering on recklessness.

To meet demand of commuters, between 1962 and 1965, LSTC expanded with the purchase of Mercedes buses but operational deficiencies and rise of licensed and unlicensed operators hampered profitability. The influx of kiakia, bolekaja and molue buses affected the profitability of the municipal service and when the government intended to regulate the licensed and unlicensed operators through new orders, it caused a road blockade by drivers and the deflation of tires on city buses.

=== Statewide ===
In 1977, the Lagos City Transport Corporation formed the foundation of the new Lagos State Transportation Corporation. New services introduced included express bus service during the peak periods of 6:00am – 10:00am and 2pm - 7pm, excursion, inter-state and contract services.

The service underwent its peak passenger load in 1980 when about 76 million trips were taken by customers. Major bus stops included Ikeja, Mile 2, Oshodi and Race Course. Beginning in the second republic, technical inefficiencies, corruption and competition eroded the passenger share of LSTC. From an average of 240 operating buses in 1978, the average fell to 110 in 1983.

== Decline ==
Services declined by 1991 and the state government gradually winded down the corporation by leasing its fleet to private operators.
