= Potato production in Nigeria =

History of Potato cultivation

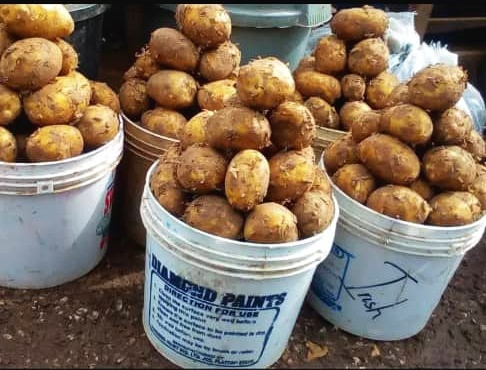
Fresh potatoes in Potiskum, Yobe state

Nigeria is one of the largest producers of potatoes in Africa. The potato was introduced to the country in the 19th century by Christian missionaries and is largely cultivated in the central region of the country in Plateau State.

== History ==
The Irish potato was first brought into Nigeria in the 19th century by Christian missionaries. During World War II, the colonial government encouraged Nigerian farmers to grow potatoes to feed British troops stationed in West Africa. A handful of European potato varieties, including pinepernel, ackersegen, dekema, and roslin eburu were introduced to Nigeria afterwards to little success. In the early 1970s, the State Ministry of Agriculture in Benue took in another set of varieties including ajax, mirka, spunta, Nicola, desiree, diamant, dan-Cameroon, alpha, cardinal and Baraka. In 1976, the Potato Research Programme of the National Roots Research Institute was established in Kuru, to look into ways of improving potato production in the country. In 1986, yet another set of varieties was imported into Nigeria: kondor, bertita, delcora, vento, famosa and romano.

== Production ==
Potato, raw, with skin
Nutritional value per 100 g (3.5 oz)
- Energy: 321 kJ (77 kcal)
- Carbohydrates: 17.47 g
- Starch: 15.44 g
- Dietary fiber: 2.2 g
- Fat: 0.1 g
- Protein: 2 g
Vitamins and minerals
Vitamins	Quantity %DV^{†}
Thiamine (B1)	7% 0.08 mg
Riboflavin (B2)	2% 0.03 mg
Niacin (B3)	7% 1.05 mg
Pantothenic acid (B5)	6% 0.296 mg
Vitamin B6	17% 0.295 mg
Folate (B9)	4% 16 μg
Vitamin C	22% 19.7 mg
Vitamin E	0% 0.01 mg
Vitamin K	2% 1.9 μg
Minerals	Quantity %DV^{†}
Calcium	1% 12 mg
Iron	4% 0.78 mg
Magnesium	5% 23 mg
Manganese	7% 0.153 mg
Phosphorus	5% 57 mg
Potassium	14% 421 mg
Sodium	0% 6 mg
Zinc	3% 0.29 mg
- Other constituents: Quantity
- Water: 75 g
- Link to USDA Database entry
- ^{†}Percentages estimated using US recommendations for adults, except for potassium, which is estimated based on expert recommendation from the National Academies.

The potato is a tuber crop which has high nutritional value. It has protein, calcium, and vitamin C. One potato of medium size contains 50 percent of the daily vitamin C needs of an adult. Its protein content is reported to be very high compared to other tubers and roots.

According to a 2013 study, Nigeria ranks seventh among potato-producing countries in Africa and fourth in Sub-Saharan Africa, with an annual production yield of around 843,000 tonnes (830,000 long tons; 929,000 short tons) and an actual planted area of 270,000 hectares (670,000 acres). In spite of that, the average yield in Nigeria of 3.1 tonnes/ha is among the world's lowest.

Potato production in Nigeria predominantly occurs in small farms whose farmers still rely on traditional tools such as machetes and hoes as opposed to tractors. According to a 2012 study, an estimated 300,000 households in Nigeria engage in potato production, which translates to an average planted area of 1 hectare (2.5 acres) per household each year. The country's main potato-planting region is the Plateau State (Barkin Ladi, Bokkos, and Mangu) which accounts for almost half of the national potato yield. Other potato-producing areas include Kaduna and Benue. Potato production takes place in both the wet season (April till August) and the dry season (September till March). Additionally, a low level of production occurs from October till January in Kano.

The potatoes are then graded by the Potato Research Programme. On average, some 200,000 tonnes (200,000 long tons; 220,000 short tons) of locally farmed potatoes are sold within the country each year while another 100,000 tonnes are unofficially sold across the West African borders. Potato production in Nigeria faces many constraints, including the unavailability of good-quality potato seeds, poor storage methods, insufficient education on farming methods and pest control, inadequate research and development, and inadequate farming equipment.

== Cuisine ==
French fries and potato crisps are widely consumed in Nigeria, with locally produced potatoes being used to make Monties and The Kings potato crisps. However, the majority of potato-based snacks in the country are still imported.
