= Railway stations in Nigeria =

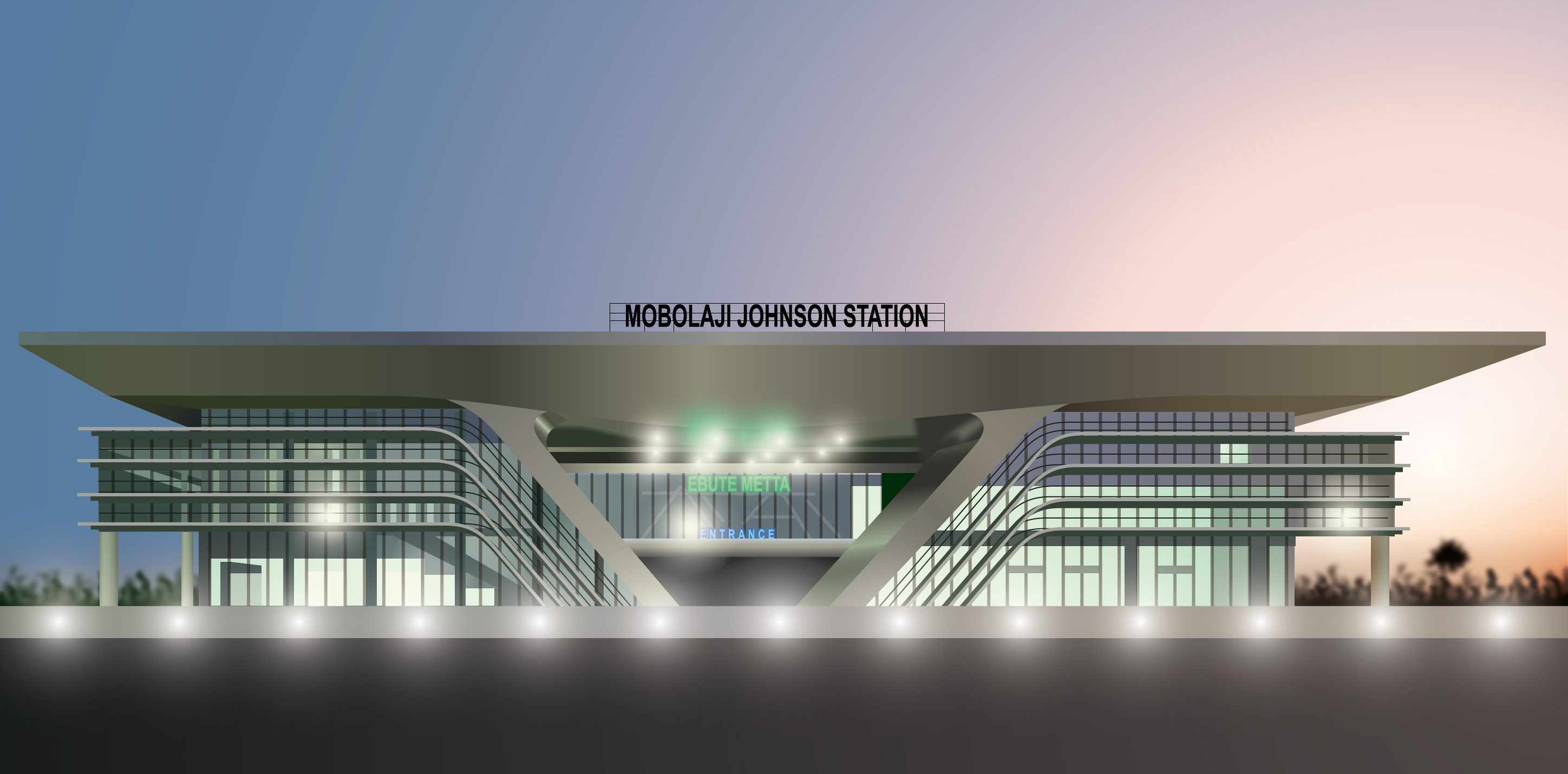
New train station Mobolaji Johnson

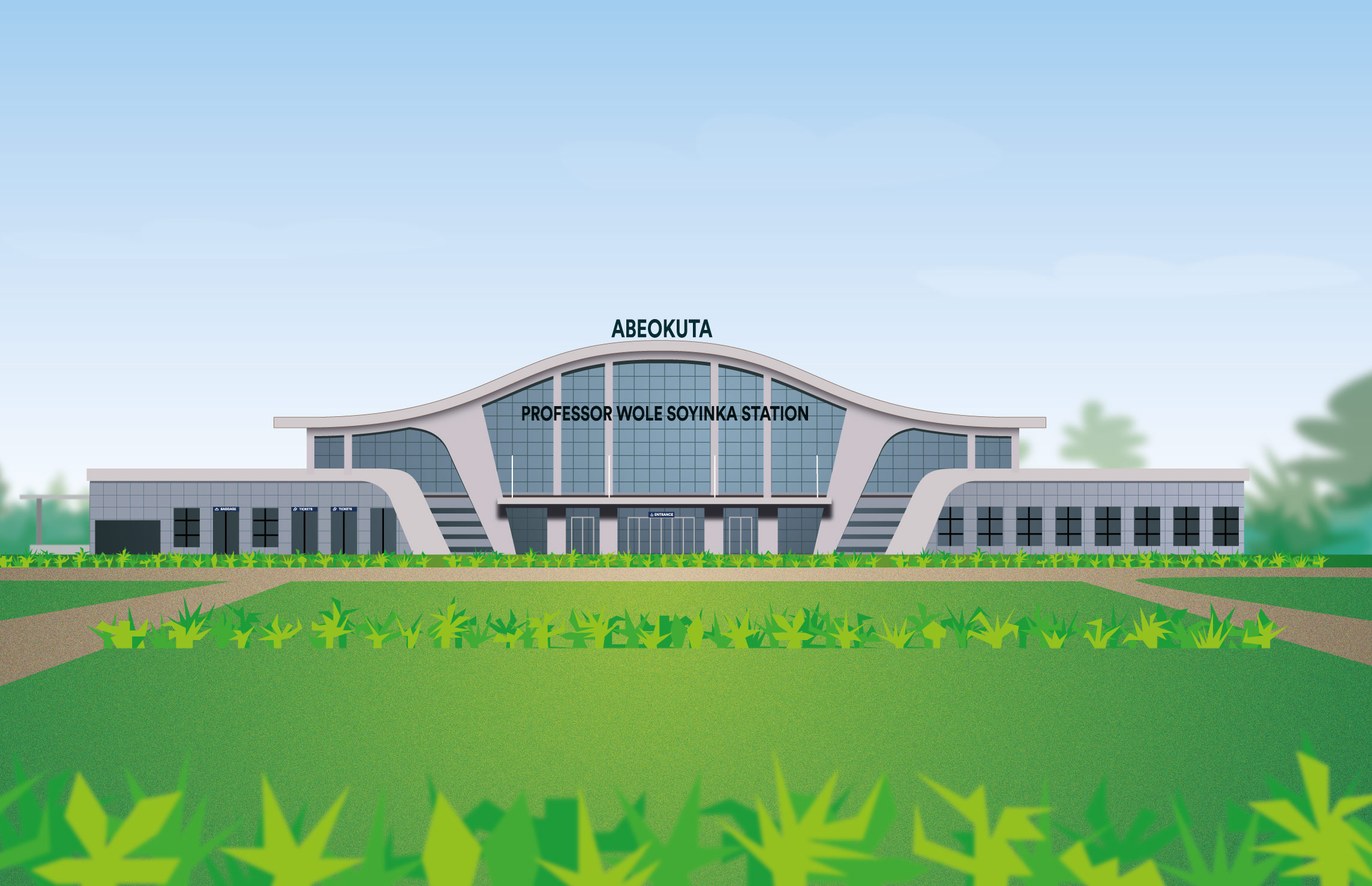
New train station in Abeokuta along the standard gauge railway line Lagos-Ibadan

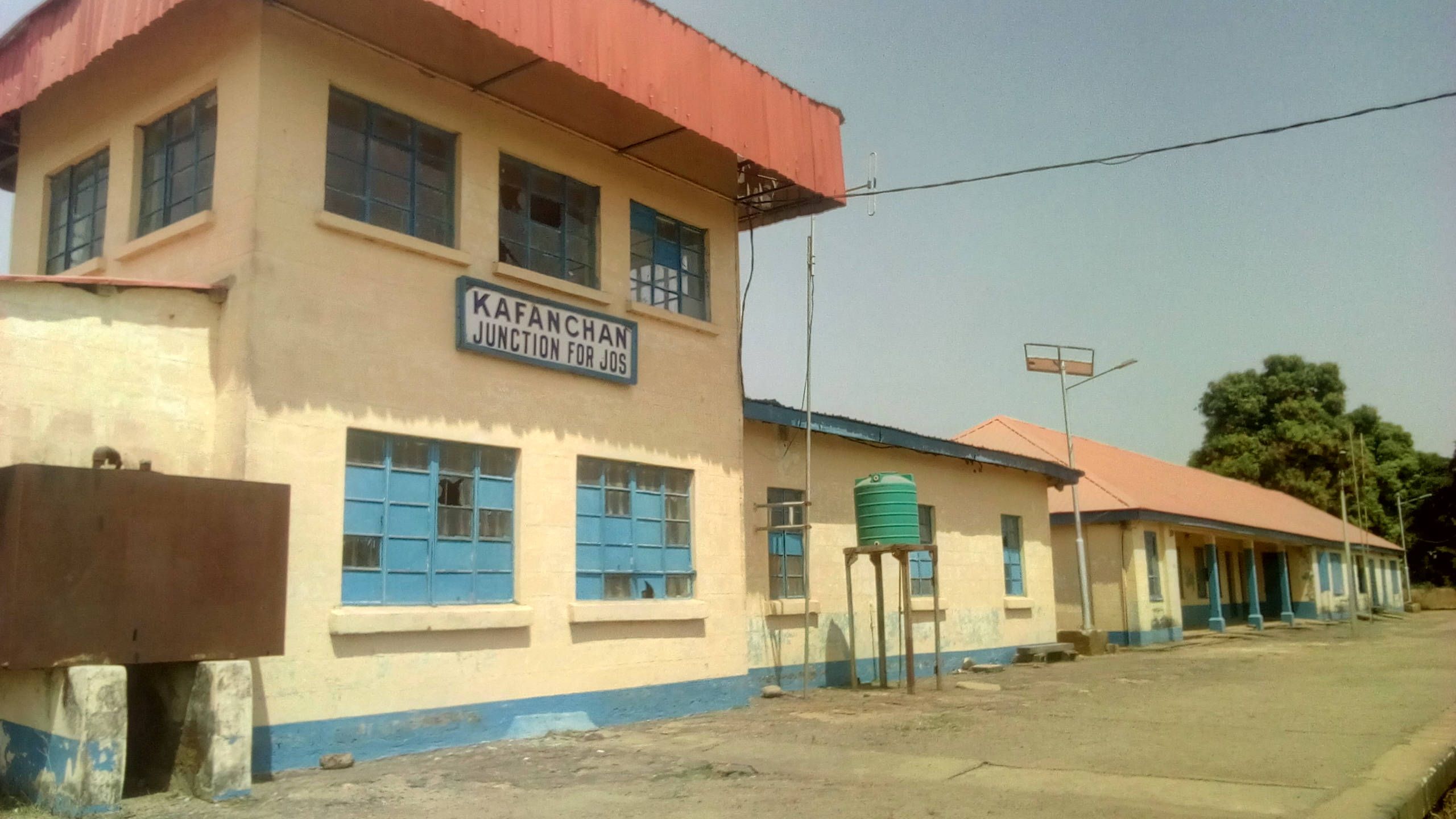
Kafanchan junction station

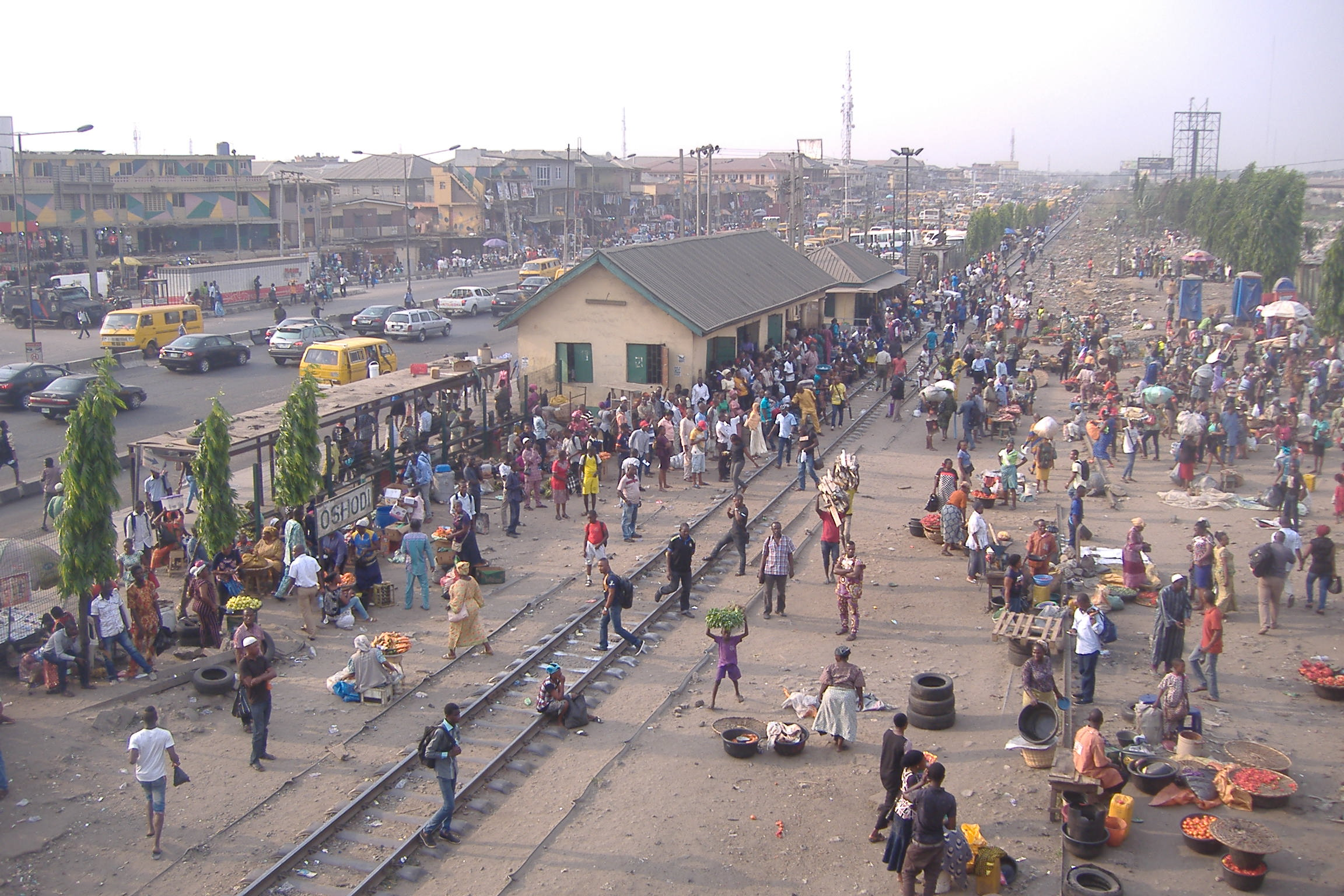
Lagos Oshodi station

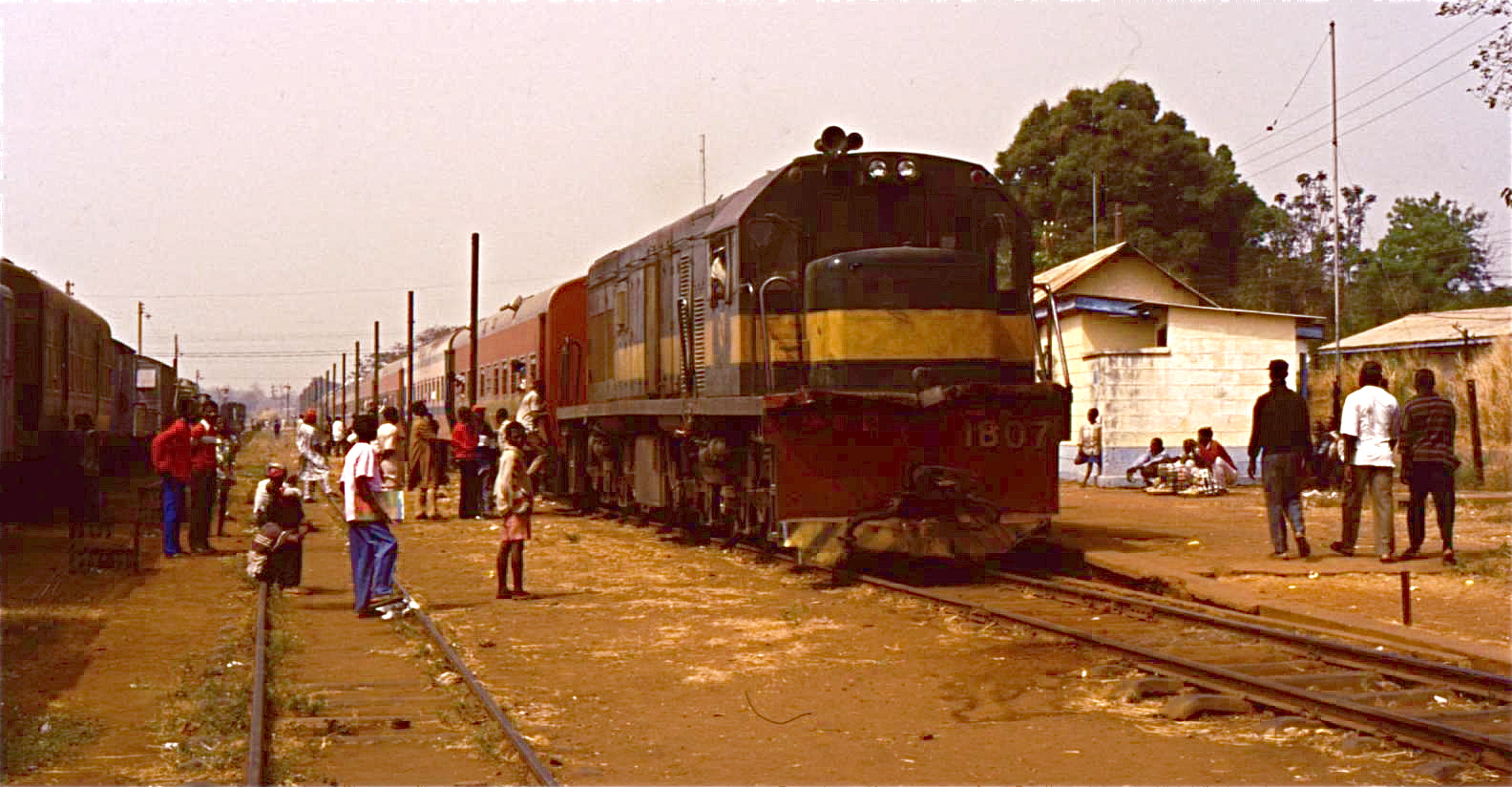
Makurdi station

Railway stations in Nigeria include:

== Maps ==
- UN Map
- UNHCR Atlas Map

== Cities served by rail ==
The East (E) and West (W) lines are connected by the Link Line.

=== West Line ===
- Apapa (W) - Lagos. Port; flour mill; oil terminals
- Lagos (W) (0 km) - Terminus station
- Yaba (W) - Lagos suburban railway
- Oshodi (W) - Lagos suburban railway
- Ikeja (W) - Lagos suburban railway
- Agege (W) - Lagos suburban railway
- Agbado (W) - Lagos suburban railway
- Ijoko (W) - terminus of suburban trains, 2013
- Abeokuta (W)

- Agege (W) - junction
- Ibadan (W) (156 km)
- Oshogbo (W)
- Ilorin (W)
- Zungeru (W) - bridge
- Minna (W) - junction for Baro
- Kaduna (W) - junction for East Line; junction for Abuja
- Zaria (WX) - junction for Kaura Namoda (W)
- (Nigeria) Kano (W) (1124 km) (capital Kano state)
- (Nigeria) Nguru (W) - terminus near Niger border

- (Nigeria) Zaria (W) - junction
- (Nigeria) Funtua (W)
- (Nigeria) Gusau (WN)
- (Nigeria) Kaura Namoda (W)
- Nigeria-Niger border
- (Niger) Niamey

- Bajoga
- Enugu
- Idogo (W) - branch terminus

  - Minna (W) - junction for Baro (capital Niger state)
  - Baro (W) (branch terminus) on River Niger

- Ikeja

  - (Standard gauge)
  - Kaduna (W) junction for Abuja (0 km) completed 2014, but not enough rolling stock (plan B)
  - Abuja (W) - national capital - 2016 (186 km) In August 2016, the new standard gauge line between Kaduna and Abuja was complete.

=== Coast Line ===
- proposed standard gauge
- Lagos
- Benin City (capital Edo state) (300 km)
- Port Harcourt (capital Rivers state)

=== Link Line ===
- Kaduna (W) - junction for East Line cross country
- Idon (WE)
- Kafanchan (E) - junction to West Line cross country

=== Central Line 1435mm ===
This line is isolated from the East and West lines.

- Agbaja (C) - Iron ore
  - (proposed 2011)

- Itakpe (C) - iron ore
- Ajaokuta (C)
- Ovu (49m) (C)
  - (incomplete 22 km)
- Warri (C) - A line to Warri was planned; contractor paid October 2009; completion unknown.

- (gauge convertible sleepers)
- Port Harcourt
- Onne

=== East Line ===
- Port Harcourt (E)
- Aba (E)
- Enugu (E)
- Otukpo (E)
- Igumale (E)
- Makurdi (E) - major bridge
- Kafanchan (E) - junction to West Line
- Kuru (E) - junction for Jos
  - Bukuru (E) - tin
  - Jos (E) - tin
- Bauchi (E) - was 762 mm (2 ft 6 in) and part of Bauchi Light Railway.
  - (built 1961)
- Gombe (E),
- Maiduguri (E) (terminus) - nearest railhead to Chad

- Lafia (E)
- Oshogbo (W)
- Umagha (E)
- Uyo (E)
- Umuahia (E)
- Chamo (E)
- Yenagoa (E) - the Bayelsa state capital since c1996

== Rehabilitate ==
- Lagos (W)
- 488 km
- Jebba (W) - on River Niger

== Under construction ==
- (standard gauge)
- (double track)
- Lagos (0 km)
- Kano (128 km)
- Ibadan (W) (156 km)

== Proposed ==
- (standard gauge)
- (Nigeria) Lagos
- (Nigeria) Abeokuta (W)
- (Nigeria) Ibadan

- Ibadan
- Oshogbo(W)
- Ilorin

- Nyanya
- Minna (W)

- (Coast Line)
- Lagos 0 km
- Benin City
- Calabar - 1402 km - near border with Cameroon

=== Feasibility studies ===
- (2014)
- Lagos-Abuja (615 km)
- Ajaokuta-Obajana-Jakura-Boro-Abuja with an additional line from Otukpo
- Anyinga-Ejule-Idah-Adoru-Nsuuka-Adani-Omor-Anaku-Aguleri-Nsugbe-Onitcha
- Zaria-Kaura Namoda-Nnewi-Owerri-Illela-Birni to Konni in the Niger Republic (520 km)
- Benin City-Agbor-Onicha-Nnewi-Owerri-Aba
- Onitcha-Enugu-Abakaliki
- Eganyi-Lokoja-Abaji-Abuja (280 km)

=== To Niger ===
- (Nigeria) Kauran Namoda (0 km) railhead
- (Nigeria) Sokoto
- (Nigeria) Birnin Kebbi
- (Nigeria) (Niger) (about 250 km) - border
- (Niger) Birnin-N'konni
- (Niger) Niamey

--

- (Nigeria) Kano (SGR)
- (Nigeria) (Niger) - border
- (Niger) Maradi

=== Nigerian Southern ===
- (Nigeria) Lagos
- (Nigeria) Niger River Delta
- (Nigeria) Port Harcourt
- (Nigeria) Calabar
- (near Cameroon border)
- (Cameroon)

=== 2010 ===
- Port Harcourt and branches
- Maiduguri
- Bonny, Nigeria
- Owerri
- Kafanchan
- Gombe, Gombe
- Damaturu
- Gashua

== Metro and Light Rail ==
Metro lines are proposed for the MegaCity of Lagos.

The first phase of Abuja Light Rail opened in July 2018.

== Closed ==
- Bauchi Light Railway 762 mm (2 ft 6 in)
- (open 1914-1927)
  - Zaria
  - Rahama

- (regauged about 1927 when 1,067 mm (3 ft 6 in) eastern main line reached Kuru)
  - Jos - tin mines
  - Bukuru - tin mines
  - Kuru - future junction
  - Bauchi

== See also ==
- Transport in Nigeria
- Rail transport in Nigeria
- (Nigeria) Lagos Terminus
- (Nigeria) Nigerian Railway Corporation
- (Nigeria) Lagos–Kano Standard Gauge Railway
