= Bauchi Light Railway =

Narrow gauge railway in Nigeria

The Bauchi Light Railway was a 2 ft 6 in (762 mm) narrow gauge railway built in 1914 to carry tin from Jos in Nigeria to the main line 3 ft 6 in (1,067 mm) railway at Zaria.

== History ==
The railway opened in sections 1912–1914, Jos-Bukuru (16 km or 9.9 mi) was widened to 3 ft 6 in (1,067 mm) narrow gauge in 1927, while the remainder closed 30 Sep 1957. The track, locomotives and rolling stock from the Wushishi Tramway were used to build and operate the line. Zaria is located to the north of Jos and the light railway was later rebuilt with a shorter connection to the main 3 ft 6 in (1,067 mm) gauge railway to the south. It also connected Bukuru. The line was 184 km (114 mi) long.

== Details ==
Rolling stock was equipped with ABC couplers.

Two of the locomotives are preserved under cover with some carriages.

== See also ==
- Railway stations in Nigeria
- Rail transport in Nigeria
