= Baro, Nigeria =

Baro Nowuyin (meaning sea in English)
- Location within Nigeria
- Coordinates: 8°35′N 6°25′E
- Country: Nigeria
- State: Niger State
- LGA: Agaie
- Established: 1912
- Elevation: 118 m (387 ft)

Population
  - Total: 6,059

Baro is a small port town on the Niger in present Niger State (central Nigeria).

A crater on Mars has been named after Baro.

== Transport ==
Baro is also a railway town situated approximately 400 miles (650 km) up the Niger River at the limit of river navigation, subject to dredging. The railway terminal or station is on bar 0 (later corrupted to baro) which was the starting point of the Baro to Kano railway. The Baro to Kano railway was built by the Northern Nigerian Protectorate under Sir Fredrick Lugard from 1907 to 1911. The line was later amalgamated with the Lagos Government Railway built by the Lagos Colony (later Southern Nigerian Protectorate) to form one single national railway known as the Nigerian railway department in 1912.

== Climate conditions ==
Baro Port Town situated in Agai Local government area of Niger state experiences climate conditions influence by is geographic location. Baro experiences is rainy season between may and October and it cold season between the month of November and February. The annual approximately rainfall in Baro is 800 to 900 millimetres (31 to 35 inches).

== See also ==
- Railway stations in Nigeria
