= Wushishi tramway =

Tramway in Nigeria

The Wushishi tramway was a narrow gauge, 2 ft 6 in (762 mm), tramway linking Wushishi to Zungeru. The line ran for 12 miles (19 km) and served to connect the highest navigable point on the Kaduna River, Wushishi, with the administrative centre of the Protectorate of Northern Nigeria. Construction began in May 1901 and was finished by December in the same year. A year later it was decided to extend the line 10 mile south along the river as Bari-Juko was judged to provide better facilities than Wushishi. The line was not to last long as by 1910 the Baro-Kano Railway, which ran through Zungero, had been completed. The Wushishi Tramway was no longer so useful and the track was lifted and used to build the Bauchi Light Railway.

The tramway's first locomotive Engine No. 1 a Hunslet 0-6-0T (wks 762) is now preserved under a canopy at Minna Station.
