= Idogo =

Town in Ogun State, Nigeria

Coordinates: 06°50′00″N 02°55′00″E

Idogo (also spelled Idawgo) is a town in western Nigeria fairly close to the border with Benin.

== Transport ==
Idogo is served by a terminus of a branch on the national railway network. A nearby river (Iyewa) also provides transportation of goods to other parts of western Africa, ipaja, olokuta, odon, including Cotonou.

== See also ==
- Railway stations in Nigeria
