= Chamo, Nigeria =

Town in central Nigeria

Coordinates: 11°59′00″N 09°23′00″E

Chamo is a town in central Nigeria.

== Transport ==
It is served by a somewhat distant station on the national railway system.

== See also ==
- Railway stations in Nigeria
