= Lagos Terminus railway station =

Railway station in Lagos, Nigeria

Lagos Terminus
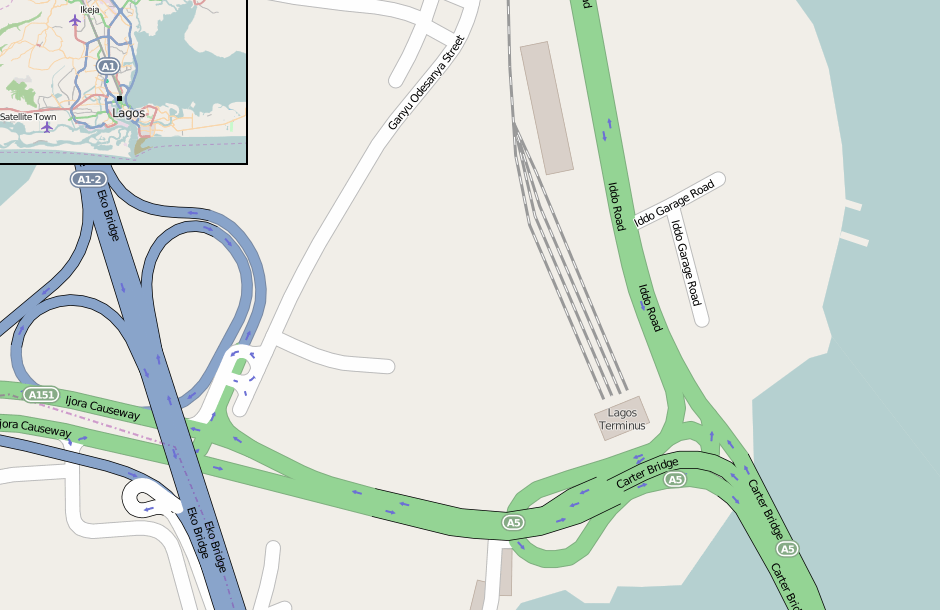
- OSM map of the station. In the upper left corner is shown its position (the black dot) within the urban area of Lagos

General information
- Location: Murtala Muhammed Way; Iddo Island, Lagos, Lagos State; Nigeria
- Coordinates: 6°28′11.17″N 3°22′57.12″E
- System: Inter-city & Commuter rails
- Operator: Nigerian Railway Corporation (NRC)
- Line: Lagos-Ibadan-Kaduna
- Platforms: 5
- Tracks: 8
- Connections: Lagos Rail Mass Transit
Location

Lagos Terminus, also known as Lagos Iddo, has been the main railway station of the city of Lagos until 2021. The rail terminus is located on Iddo Island, nearby Lagos Island, near the Lagos mainland. The station is a key part of the Nigeria railway Corporation's (NRC) network, handling both passenger and freight services.

== Overview ==
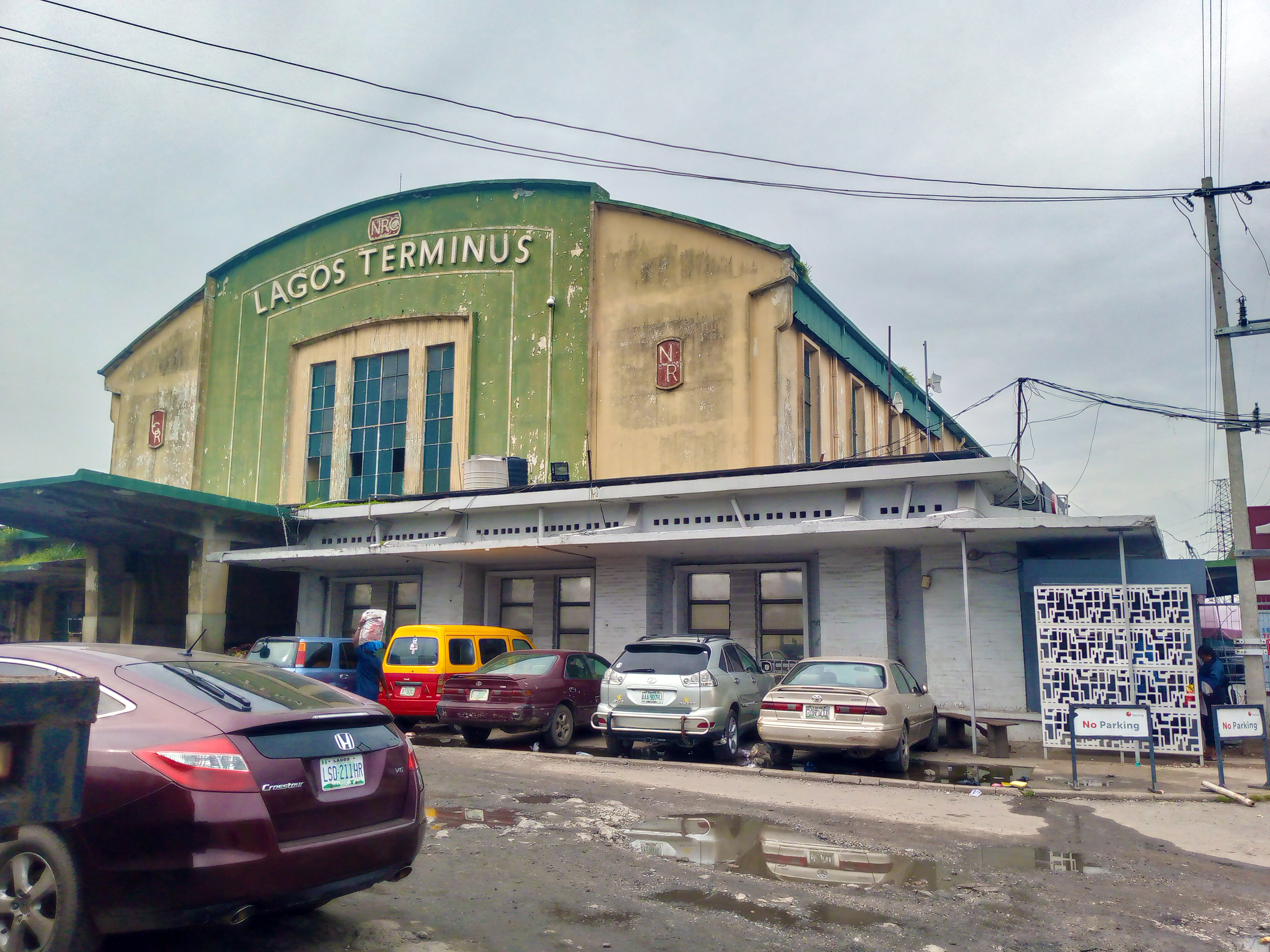
The Nigeria Railway Corporation Terminus, Iddo Island, Lagos. Picture taken from the bridge entrance.

The station, located in front of Carter Bridge and by the Lagos Lagoon, has a large two floor terminal building. It counts also a pair of train sheds: one located just outside the station platforms and a larger one located 2 km north, nearby Lagos Yaba station.

The line serving Lagos Terminus, as well as the entire national network, is not electrified; and the track gauge is narrow (1,067 mm).

== Services ==
Lagos station is the terminus of commuter and long distance trains, as for example the flagship express train to Kano, in north of Nigeria and 1,126 km (700 miles) far from Lagos. A standard gauge high-speed line, connecting Lagos to Abuja, has been planned in early 2010s, as part of the development plan of the Nigerian railways.

Lagos Terminus is served by two lines (red and blue) of the Lagos Rail Mass Transit, at Iddo metro station.

== Historical background ==
The origins of Lagos Terminus dates back to the colonial era when railway development was a priority for enhancing trade and movement across British-controlled territories. The station was a central point in Nigeria's first railway line, which started in Lagos in 1898 and later extended to northern regions.

== Facilities ==
- Ticketing and waiting areas
- Platforms and Tracks
- Freight Handling areas
- Administrative offices

== Rail routes and services ==
Lagos terminus is the starting point for several important rail routes, including:

- Lagos-Ibadan railway: a railway connecting Lagos with Ibadan.
- Lagos-Kano railway: this railway connects the southwest to the northern region in Nigeria, and its one of the longest railway routes in Nigeria.
- Commuter rail services: this is for short-distance routes catering to daily travellers within Lagos and its surrounding areas.

== See also ==
- Lagos Rail Mass Transit
- Rail transport in Nigeria
- Railway stations in Nigeria
