= Kuru, Nigeria =

Kuru
- District of Jos
- Interactive map of Kuru
- country: Nigeria
- Elevation: 1,220 m (4,000 ft)
- Time zone: UTC+1 (WAT)

Kuru is located on the Jos Plateau in north-central Nigeria commonly referred as the middle belt region of Nigeria. Located about 20 km to Jos on the Jos-Abuja highway in Plateau State. Kuru is a conglomerate of other small semi - developed villages, hamlets and households not too far from one another. The occupants are the Berom's Wurom.

Kuru has two federal wards; Kuru "A" (Kuru lo) and Kuru "B" (Hwak village, commonly known as Trade center). Which are also made up of hamlets; Dakan, Danchol, Dahwol Vwana, Dakan, Gakok, Kanadap, Dazek, Gwes, Dahwak, Kushe, vwei, Gasen, Vwanyama, Gucho, Dabwa-Hwak, Wat, Dabwak, Dankarang, Dungus, Chwel Hwak, Damum, Dakyen, Zankong, Kaninkon, Datoh-Dagonu etc. Modern day development brought National Institute For Policy and Strategic Studies to Kuru "B" Ward in Hwak village, located at Dachwa modernly known Gachas, Via Vom Road, Nigeria.

== Institutions ==
Kuru has a secondary school called Government Science School. It also hosts the prestigious National Institute of Policy and Strategic Studies (NIPSS), which attracts members of the Nigerian political class and foreign nationals as well.

== People ==
The population of Kuru is mainly Berom. It has an estimated population of 4,331.

== Transportation ==
Kuru town sits along a Nigerian Railway Corporation rail line connecting Port Harcourt, Enugu, Kafanchan, Kuru, Bauchi, and finally Maiduguri.

Kuru was established in 1838. When the first railway that was designed in 1943 was built there in 2004.

== See also ==
- Railway stations in Nigeria
