= J.N. Zarpas =

J.N. Zarpas was a Greek owned transport company that operated in Lagos during the colonial period. The firm was founded by John Nicholas Zarpas in 1929 and it dominated public transportation within the metropolis from 1933 to 1958.

Zarpas operations began as a bus service between Lagos Island and the new Yaba Estate via Ebute Metta. The firm's owner started the route with purchase of Dennis buses. However, the service initially was not profitable, Zarpas then added additional bus stops to increase traffic. The completion of Carter Bridge in 1931 and increased movement to the mainland improved traffic and Zarpas' fortunes. The firm charged a penny for its premier service and by 1933 it was generating profit and expanding with a staff of 75 people. The firm added Albion trucks to its fleet and added the Lagos to Apapa route. Though it was not the first bus services initiated in Nigeria, Charlotte Obasa, daughter of R.B. Blaize had earlier ran a non-profit oriented service after the Lagos tram closed. Zarpas service created the nucleus of a regular public transportation in Lagos. In 1933, more companies bidded to operate bus services from Lagos Island to Ebute Metta. By 1940, commuter traffic was on the increase, Zarpas' inability to source for new vehicles as a result of the war led to over-crowded buses especially during peak hours. Zarpas secured Lagos Town Council's permission to increase the number of standing passengers.

In 1958, after accusations of favoritism and monopolistic tendencies, Zarpas Services was acquired by the Lagos Town Council and re-organized as the Lagos Municipal Transport Service which later became Lagos State Transport Corporation (LSTC). However, LSTC buses were considered slow by the public who were now used to 'molue' and 'danfo' buses that did not waste time at each bus stop.
