= Nigerian Railway Corporation =

Railway Corporation

- NRC
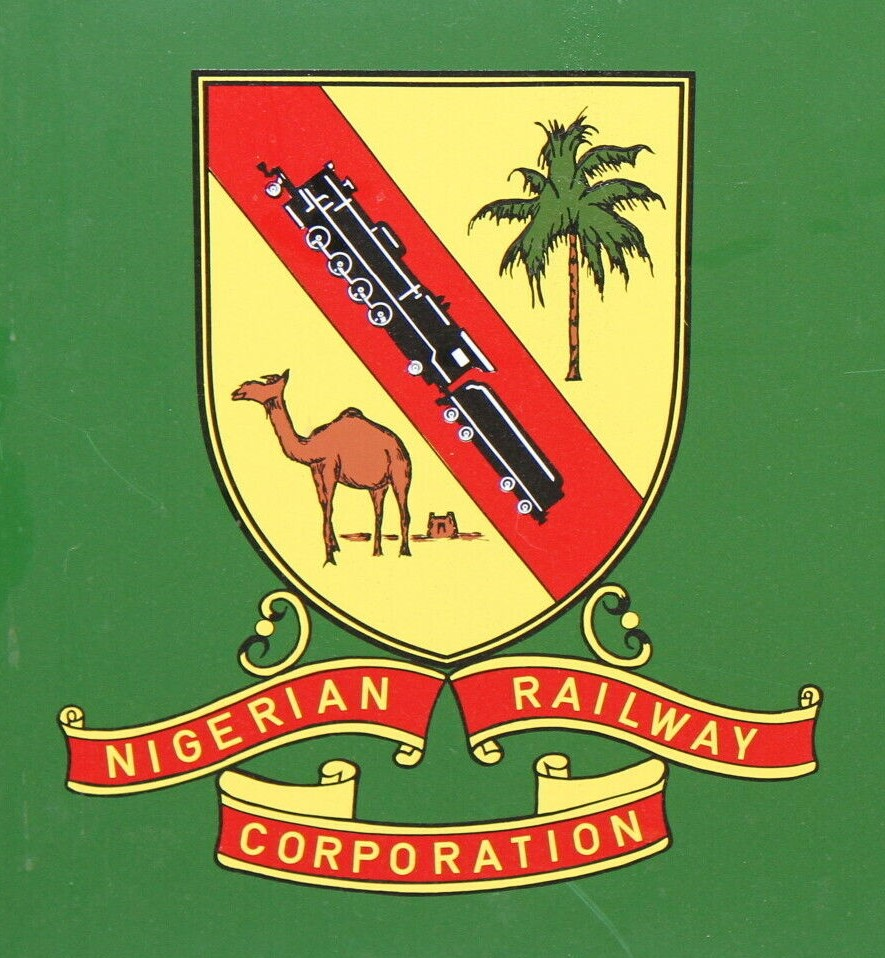

Overview
- Headquarters: 1, Okeira Road, Railway Compound, Ebute-Metta, Lagos
- Locale: Nigeria
- Dates of operation: 3 October 1912–present
- Predecessors: Lagos Government Railway, Baro-Kano Railway, Government Department of Railways

Other
- Website: https://nrc.gov.ng

Nigerian Railway Corporation (commonly abbreviated as NRC) is the state-owned enterprise with exclusive rights to operate railways in Nigeria.

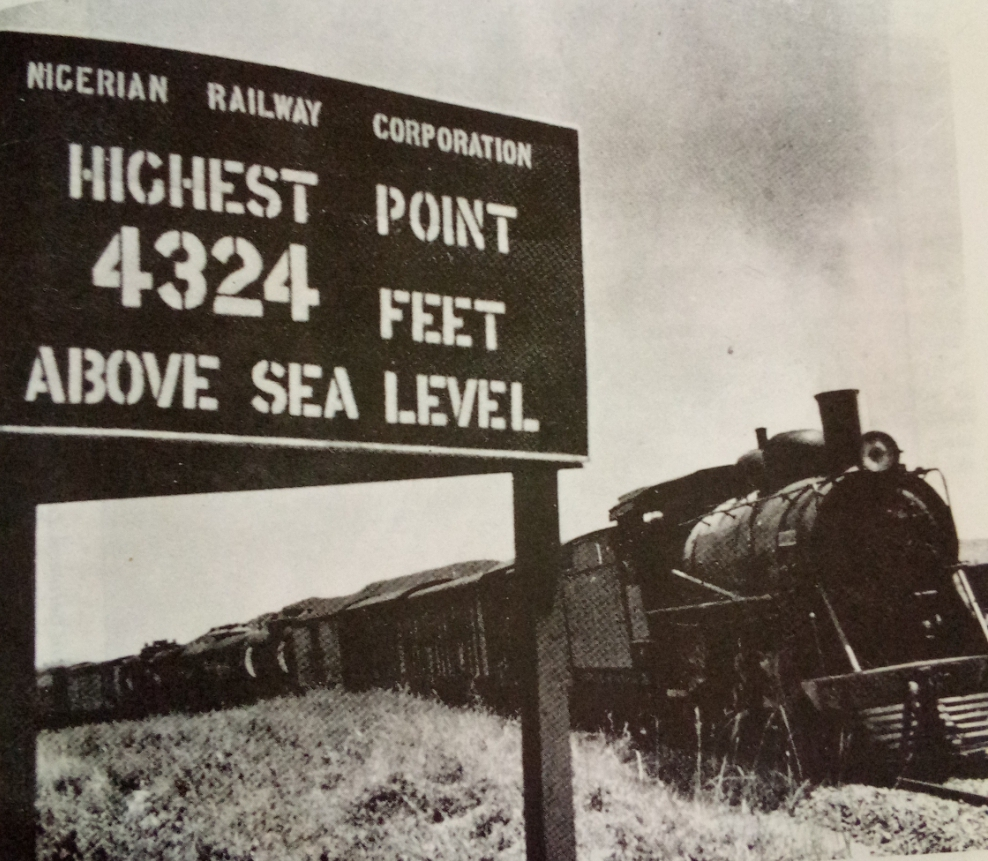
Nigerian Railway Billboard after invention.

== History ==
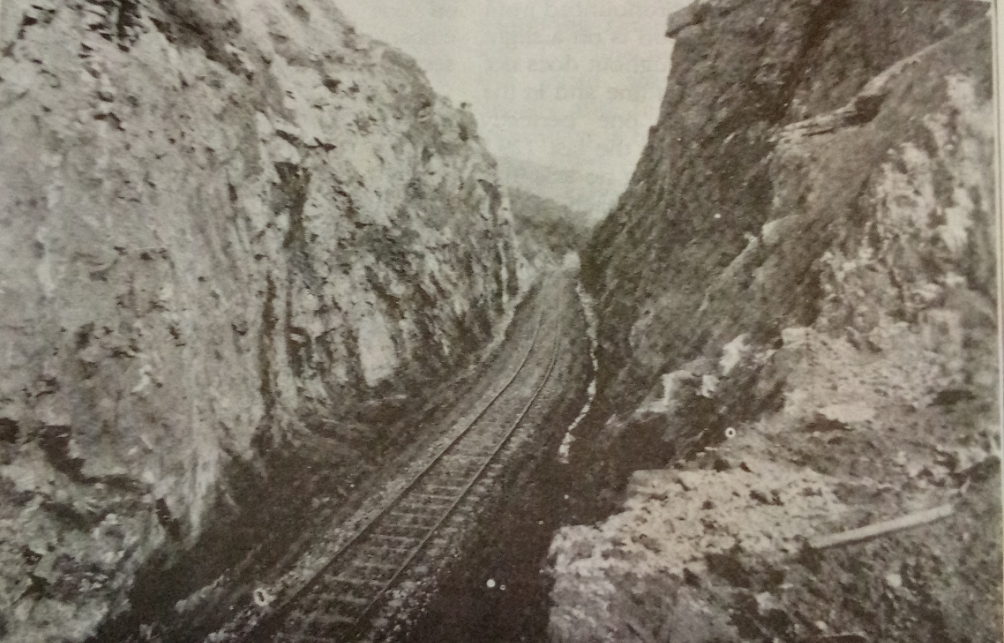
The railway passing through valleys.

The Nigerian Railway Corporation traces its history to the year 1898, when the first railroad in Nigeria was constructed by the British colonial government. On 3 October 1912, the Lagos Government Railway and the Baro-Kano Railway were amalgamated, starting nationwide rail service under the name Government Department of Railways. With the passing of the Nigerian Railway Corporation Act of 1955, the company gained its current name as well as the exclusive legal right to construct and operate rail service in Nigeria. The rail network reached its maximum extent shortly after Nigerian independence, in 1964. Shortly after that, the NRC entered a long period of decline, inept management, and eventually a complete lack of maintenance of rail and locomotive assets. In 1988, NRC declared bankruptcy, and all rail traffic stopped for six months. After that, trains resumed, where the tracks were usable. By 2002, passenger service was again discontinued altogether. Starting in 2006, plans were made to restore the rail lines and add new locomotives with foreign assistance. In December 2012, regular scheduled passenger service was restored on the Lagos to Kano line.

The Nigerian Railway Corporation recorded record revenues of 2.12 billion naira (approximately €4.664 million) in the first half of 2021, an increase of 31% over the same period in 2019, which recorded the previous record revenue. At the same time, revenue from freight transport was down, with gains coming mainly from passenger transport between Lagos and Ibadan on the new standard gauge.

== Infrastructure and operations ==
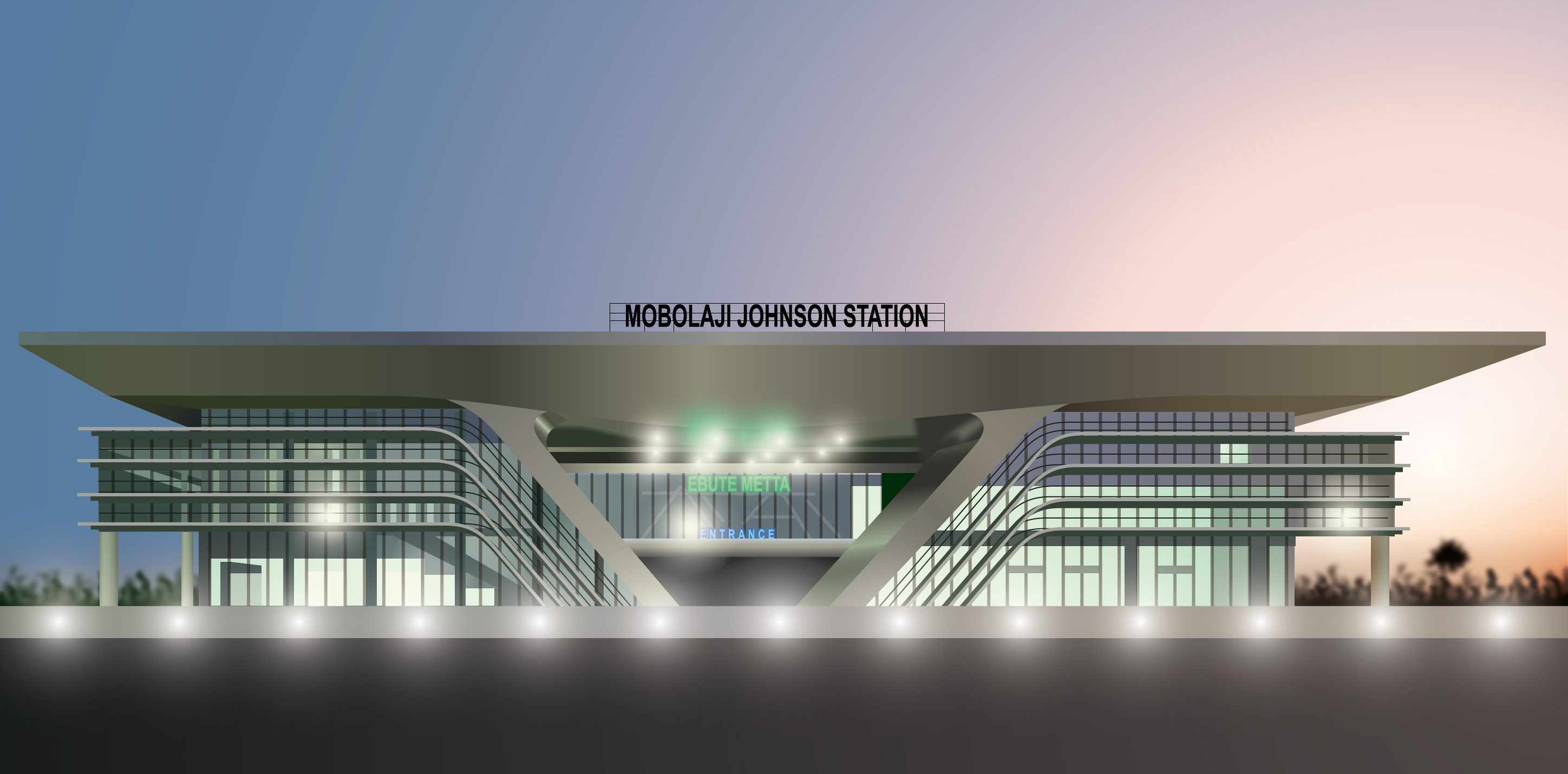
Main railway station Lagos in Ebute Metta, artistic impression

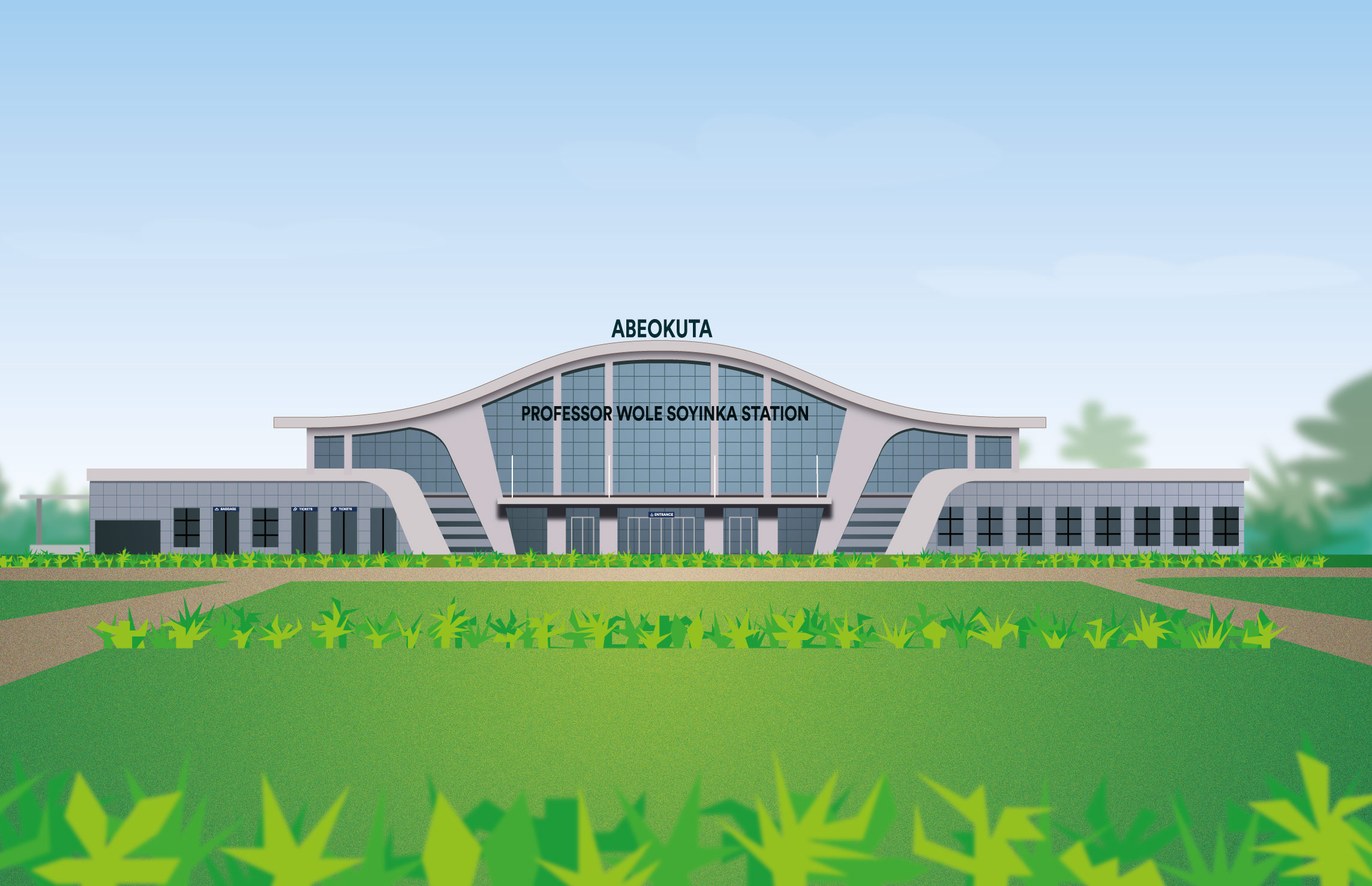
New railway station in Abeokuta, artistic impression

=== Rail lines ===
Nigerian Railway Corporation operates a network of 3,505 kilometres (2,178 mi) of single track lines 1,067 mm (3 ft 6 in) gauge, as well as 1,435 mm (4 ft 8 1/2 in) from Abuja to Kaduna.

None of the NRC's lines are electrified. 157 kilometres are double-tracked. These are located between Lagos and Ibadan. The rail lines are mostly built of rails with a weight per metre of 29.8 kg, 34.7 kg or 39.7 kg. In total, the NRC network is almost 4,000 kilometres (2,500 mi) long. The government is considering converting the existing rail network from cape gauge to standard gauge.

==== Cape gauge lines ====
The Nigerian Railway Corporation operates a 3,505-kilometre Cape Gauge network consisting of the following lines:

- 1,126 km (700 mi): Lagos - Agege - Ifo - Ibadan -Ilorin - Minna - Kaduna - Zaria - Kano
- 20 km (12 mi): Ifo - Ilaro
- 155 km (96 mi): Minna - Baro
- 245 km (152 mi): Zaria - Kaura Namoda
- 885 km (550 mi): Kano - Nguru Kaduna - Kafanchan - Kuru - Bauchi - Maiduguri
- 55 km (34 mi): Kuru - Jos
- 737 km (458 mi): Kafanchan - Makurdi- Enugu - Port Harcourt

Under construction is the 1,443-kilometre Eastern Rail Line from Port Harcourt to Maiduguri since 9 March 2021, with construction activities including renovation or reconstruction of existing lines. The project also includes new branch lines to Owerri and Damaturu, increasing the total length 2,044 km. Completion is scheduled for 2024.

Funding for the Lagos-Calabar rail line along the Nigerian coast to be built under Chinese management was released in early 2021, but the start of construction appears to be delayed to a date after the Nigerian general election in 2023.

The line to Gusau has been closed since a bridge collapsed in 2002.

The NRC network does not yet connect to the rail network of neighboring states. However, in February 2021, construction began on a cape-gauge link from Kano to Maradi, the second-largest city in Niger, under the auspices of Portugal's Mota-Engil SGPS SA, with planned inauguration in 2023, which will be one of the first rail lines in Niger. Subsequently construction has begun on a standard gauge link from Kano to Maradi.

In September 2022, after a 10-year interruption, the Cape Gauge service from Bauchi to the suburb of Inkil resumed. Train services in this area, northeastern Nigeria, were at a standstill due to the Boko Haram unrest and were subsequently renovated.

==== Standard gauge lines ====
A standard gauge network is developing.

The oldest standard-gauge line is the original 217-kilometre line from Oturkpo to the Ajaokuta steel mill. An earlier standard gauge line of 51.5 kilometres (32.0 mi) operated between the Itakp mines and the Ajaokuta steel mill. On 29 September 2020, an extension, the Warri-Itakpe Railway, was officially opened by President Muhammadu Buhari in a virtual ceremony. In 2018, employees of China Civil Engineering Construction Corp (CCECC) working on the project had been attacked twice by "bandits." Passenger trains have been running on the standard gauge line since October 2020 and freight trains since April 2021. There are also plans for an extension here: from Ajaokuta to Abuja. This would give the line a length of 500 kilometres (310 mi). Another planned line runs from Port Harcourt to Makurdi over a length of 463 kilometres (288 mi).

Construction of the Abuja-Kaduna line by CCECC began in February 2011, and it was finally inaugurated on 26 July 2016. The total cost was US$870 million. The 186.5-kilometre line, which begins in Idu 20 kilometres west of central Abuja, requires two hours of travel time for high-speed trains with a maximum speed of 100km/h. In August 2020, NRC reported that about 50% of the revenue of its entire rail network (about 4,000km) would be generated by the standard gauge Abuja-Kaduna line (186km). That Nigerians like to take the train between the capital Abuja and the next largest city Kaduna also has very serious reasons. Indeed, the "highway" between the two cities is a constant target for muggers. A train journey is thus the safer alternative to a car for residents of both cities. In 2019, a train traveller says, "I was kidnapped and now only travel by train!" Celebrities are also affected: As recently as 20 November 2021, Zamfara State governorship candidate Sagir Hamidu died in a robbery on the said Abuja-Kaduna Expressway. Train traveller Agatha Ameh says, "Although, I know some people who still travel by road, possibly because it's cheaper, I will prefer the train services any day, any time. It's safer, smoother, and even faster." She particularly praises the e-ticketing platform on the Abuja-Kaduna line. On 28 March 2022, the Abuja-Kaduna line was the target of a terrorist attack in which a large number of passengers and train staff were killed or kidnapped. Some of the 168 abductees were gradually released for ransom. The line was shut down. Five months later, the terrorists still hold some hostages. However, there are increasing voices, especially from Muslim associations, to restart the train service between Abuja and Kaduna anyway.

The Lagos-Ibadan double-track line has been under construction by CCECC since March 2017 and was inaugurated at the new Lagos Central Station on 10 June 2021. It is 157km long and passes through Abeokuta. It is the first double-track standard gauge line in West Africa. A Lagos-Ibadan journey takes two and a half hours, half as long as the equivalent car journey. All compartments (standard class, business class and first class) are air-conditioned and have three overhead screens. The window seats are equipped with power outlets and USB charging stations. Criticisms include the fact that tickets are not available online and only for cash payment, and that there are only two trips a day in each direction. There is praise for the punctuality and cleanliness of the trains. The Cape Gauge tracks, which continue to exist, are to be shared by the "Red Line" of the Lagos Light Rail, which is currently under construction.

Modern station buildings have been constructed along all new standard gauge lines. The new main station of Lagos, Mobolaji Johnson (named after a brigadier Mobolaji Johnson (1936–2019), for example, offers air-conditioned waiting rooms, handicapped access to the tracks, airport-like display boards of departure times, clean toilets, trained personnel for medical emergencies, etc.

=== Trains ===
Trains offer relatively new rolling stock consisting of Couchette-type sleepers, air-conditioned first-class sitting coaches and non-air-conditioned economy-class coaches. Trains to/from Lagos also offer buffet cars. Between Lagos and Ifo, a distance of 48 kilometers (30 mi), a local service operates on working days on behalf of the city of Lagos.

All trains are diesel locomotive operated. The railways owns nearly 200 locomotives, of which up to 75% are not operational. It also owns about 54 shunters, 480 passenger coaches and more than 4900 freight wagons; less than 50% of the coaches and wagons are in serviceable conditions.

No trains have run on the Gusau branch since a bridge collapsed in Tsafe in 2002.

== Finances ==
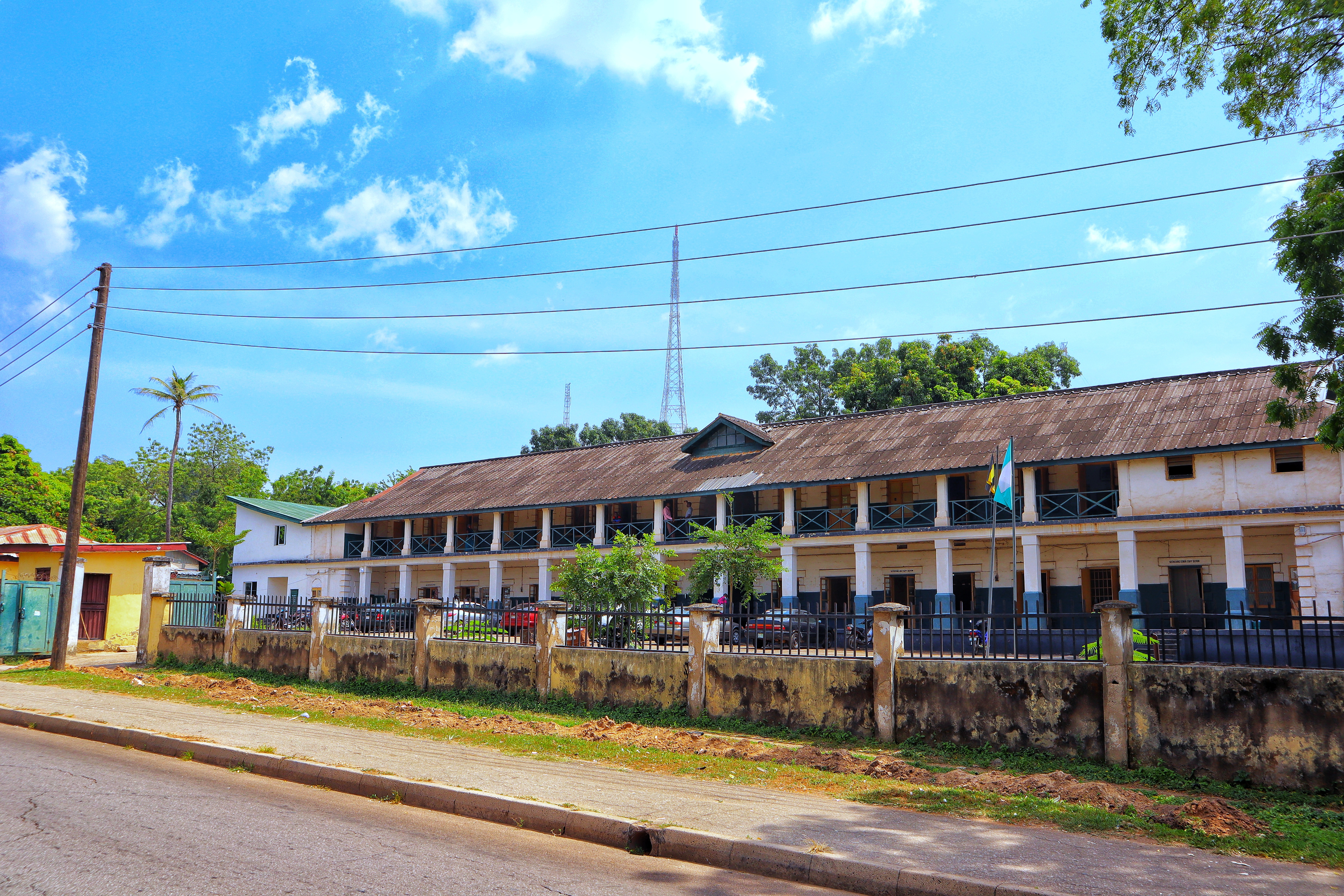
Nigerian Railway Yard Minna, Niger State

NRC went more than once into bankruptcy during the last 20 years. Lack of maintenance on infrastructure and rolling stock and a high number of employees the railway produced huge deficits, not taken over by the state. In 2005, after several re-organisations of the system passenger transport was reduced to four departures weekly from Lagos of which two went to Kano, one to Jos and one to Maiduguri; from Port Harcourt four trains every week ran to Kano (two weekly), one weekly to Jos and one to Maiduguri.

== Status in 2008 ==
According to the critique by Mazi Jetson Nwankwo (February 2007 to May 2011) acting managing director of the NRC the rail system is suffering from the lack of political will by the nation's politicians. While the NRC had employed about 45,000 people between 1954 and 1975, current employment is only 6,516. He pointed out that no new wagons had been bought since 1993, and some wagons date back to 1948. Track condition limits trains to a speed of 35 km/h.

== See also ==
- Ago Egba
- Jaekel House
- Lagos Terminus railway station
- Nigerian Railway locomotives
- Rail transport in Nigeria
- Transport in Nigeria

== Specifications ==
- Couplers: ABC
- Brakes: Vacuum
