= Iddo Island =

Island in Lagos, Nigeria

Coordinates: 6°28′8″N 3°22′49″E

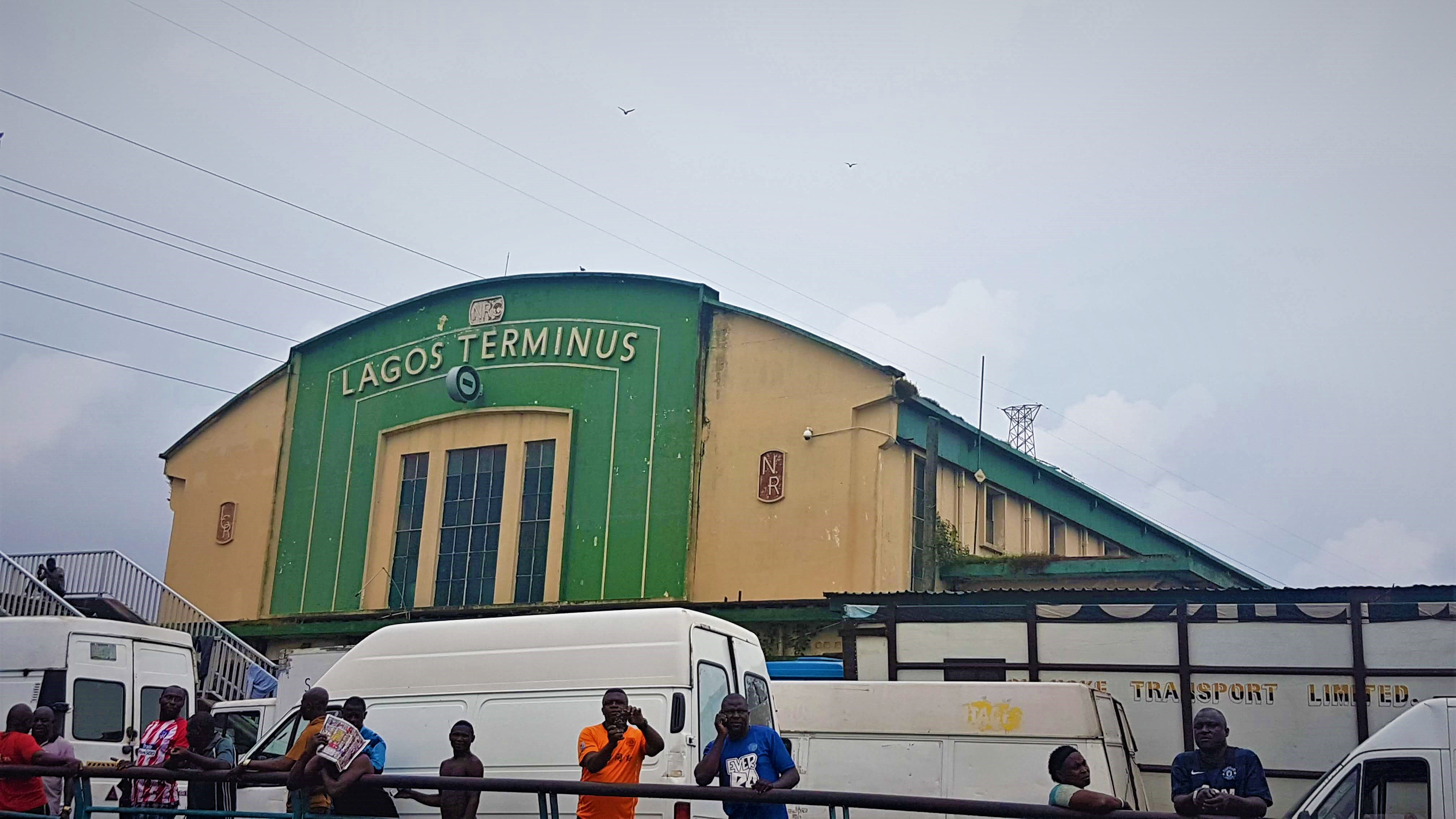
Lagos Terminus is a part of Iddo Island

Iddo Island is a district in Lagos Mainland LGA of Lagos. Opposite Lagos Island, Iddo used to be an island, but due to land reclamation, is now part of the rest of Lagos Mainland. Iddo Island is connected to Lagos Island by the Eko Bridge and the Carter Bridge. Prior to the landfill, Iddo was connected to the Lagos Mainland by the Denton Bridge, named after Sir George Chardin Denton, former Lieutenant Governor of the Colony of Lagos. Iddo is home to the Lagos Terminus and was the first and only place in Nigeria to host a tram service - linking Lagos Island through Carter Bridge.

== Overview ==
Lagos was founded by the Awori in the 13th century, Iddo was settled by Olofin Ogunfuminire and his followers whose descendants still own and rule Iddo Island today. Lagos is a Yoruba settlement, and was known as Eko. The rulers of Isale Eko on Lagos Island since then have all descended from the Awori warrior Ashipa who was the first governor of the town appointed by Oba of Benin whose interest he protected, while the land owning aristocracy (Idejo) are Yoruba who trace their lineage to Chief Olofin Ogunfunmire. Ashipa's son, Ado, built his palace on Lagos Island, and moved the seat of government to Lagos Island from Iddo island.

== See also ==
- Lagos Terminus railway station
