= Carter Bridge =

Bridge in Nigeria

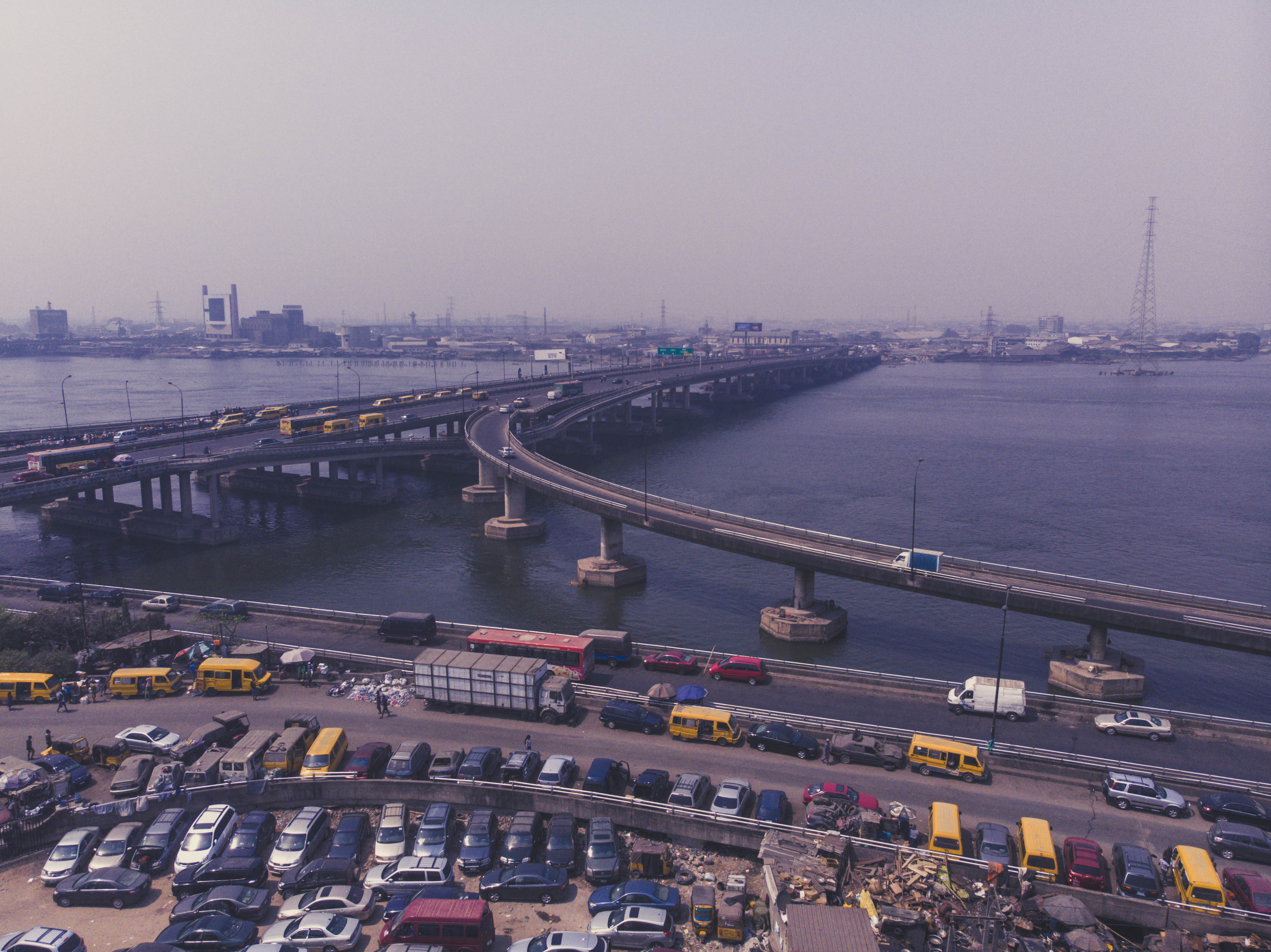
- Coordinates: 6.4672°N 3.3847°E
- Carries: Vehicular traffic
- Crosses: Lagos Lagoon connects Lagos Island to mainland Lagos State
- Locale: Lagos, Nigeria

Statistics
- Toll: No

Location
- Interactive map of Carter Bridge

Carter Bridge built in 1901 is one of three bridges connecting Lagos Island to the mainland, the other are the Third Mainland and Eko bridges. At the time of its construction, this was the only bridge connection between the mainland and Lagos Island. The bridge starts from Iddo on the mainland and ends at Idumota area of Lagos Island.

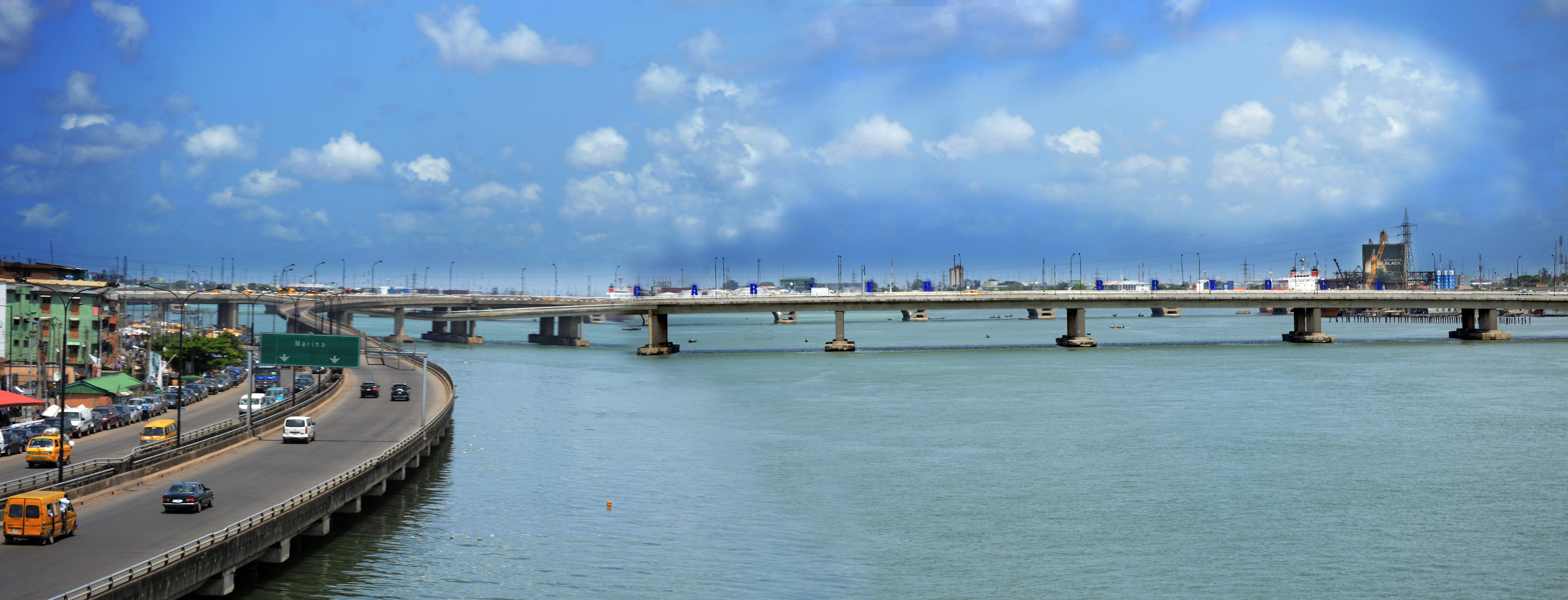

The bridge was named after Sir Gilbert Thomas Carter, a former Governor of the Colony of Lagos.

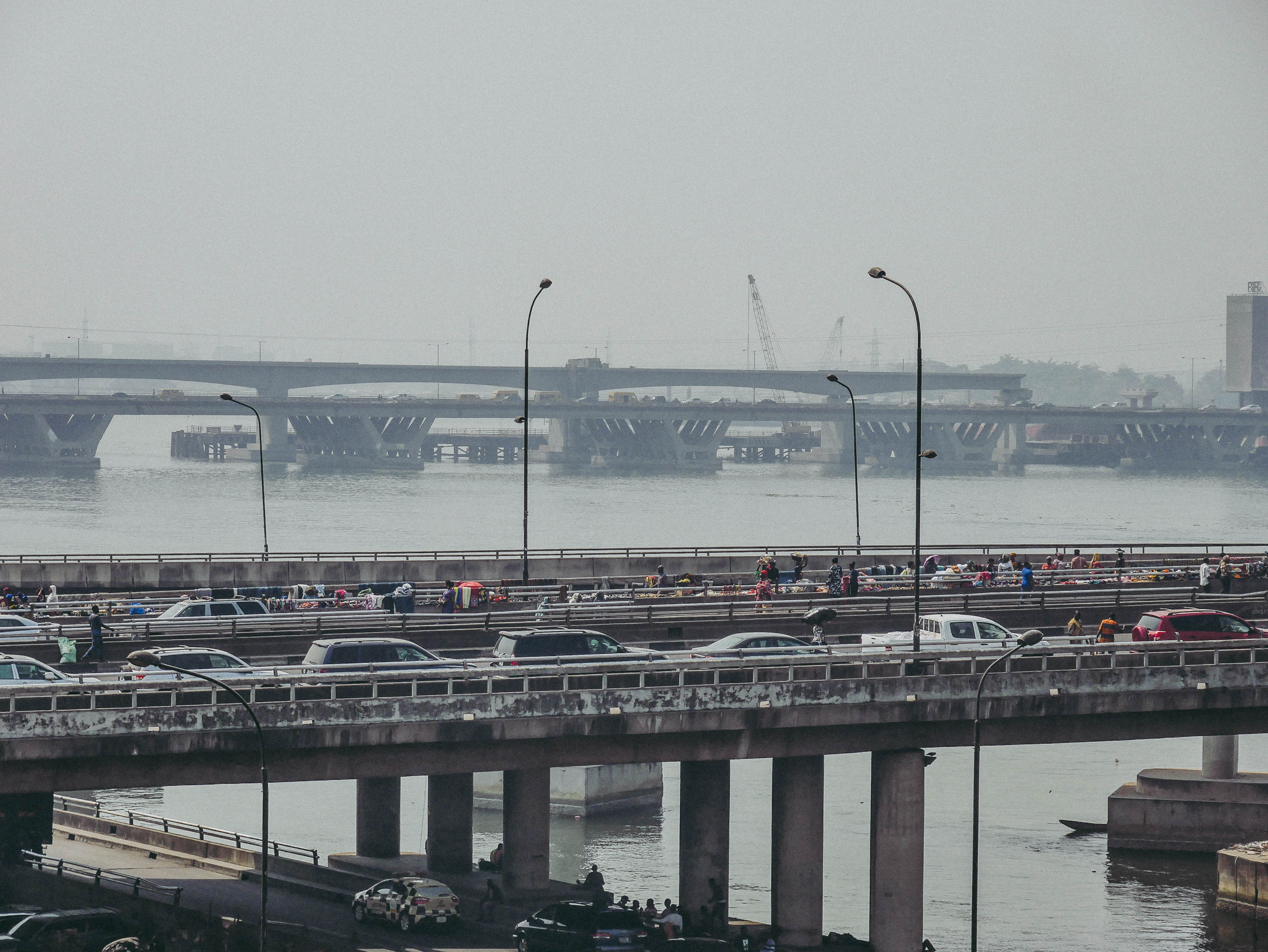

The Carter Bridge was originally constructed by the British colonial government, prior to Nigerian independence in 1960. After independence, the bridge was dismantled, redesigned and rebuilt during late 1970s. The Alaka-Ijora flyover, on the Iddo end of the span was completed in 1973.

== Overview ==
The parking of vehicles on the bridge has resulted in both severe road congestion in addition to contributing to its rapid deterioration. In 2003, the Nigerian Institute of Structural Engineers noted that the parking of vehicles along the span may result in collapse if left unaddressed. To address this issue, the Lagos State government has instituted a ₦50,000 fine for persons parking their vehicles along the span. Additionally, in April 2006, the Lagos State Transport Commissioner announced that all commercial vehicles would be banned from entering Lagos Island by way of the Carter Bridge to keep buses and other vehicles from parking on the bridge.

In addition to congestion on the bridge, Carter was perceived as unsafe at night due to the lack of streetlights. In July 2013, Governor Fashola of Lagos State commissioned streetlights on Carter Bridge powered by an Independent Power Project. The project was conceptualized, designed and completed by the State's Electricity Board (www.lseb.gov.ng) using local components and technicians.

== See also ==
- Lagos Terminus railway station
