= List of Nigerian locomotive classes =

Nigerian locomotive classes include:

== Steam ==
=== Tender ===
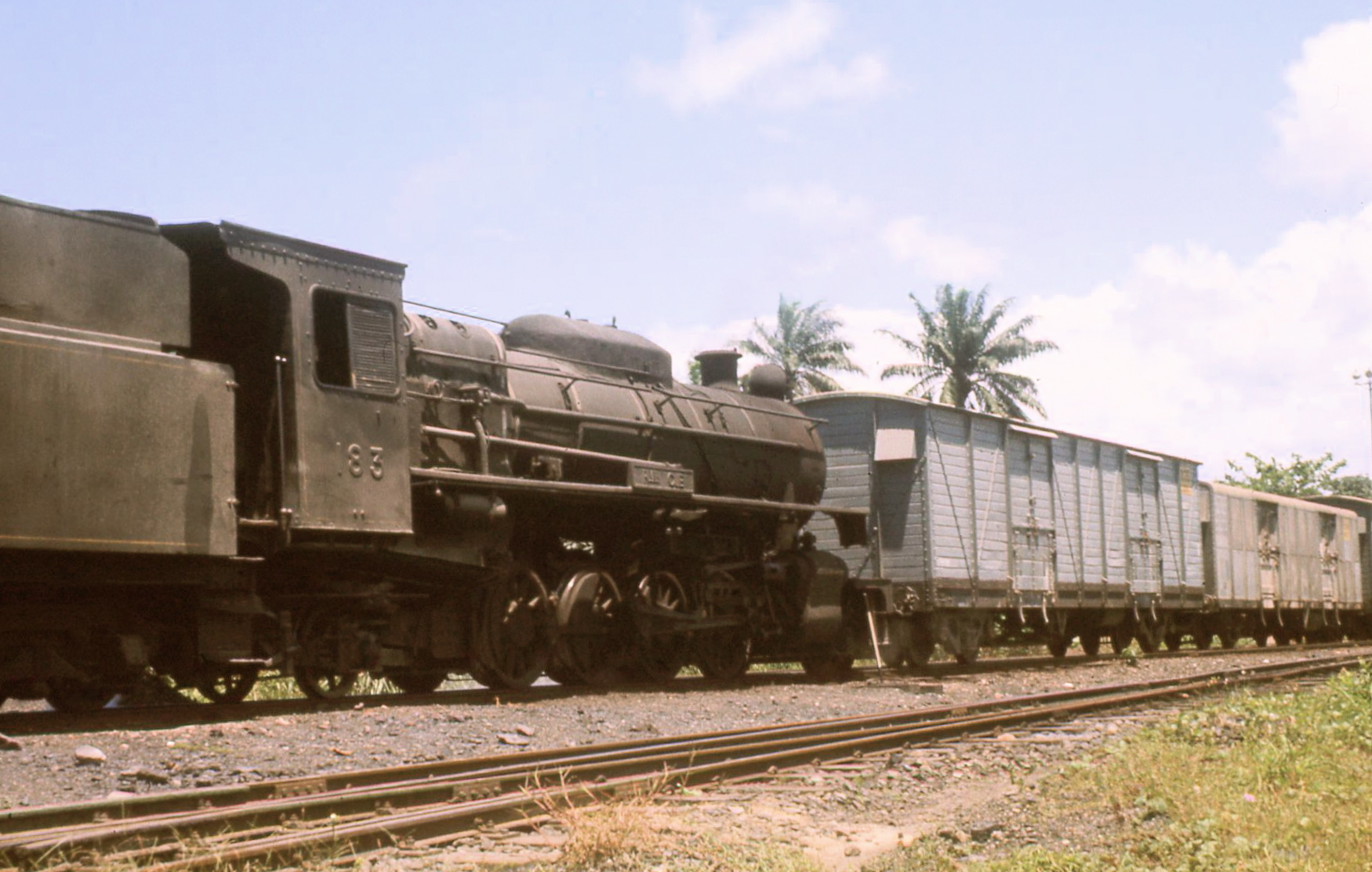
River Class No. 183 "River Owe" near Port Harcourt, 1974

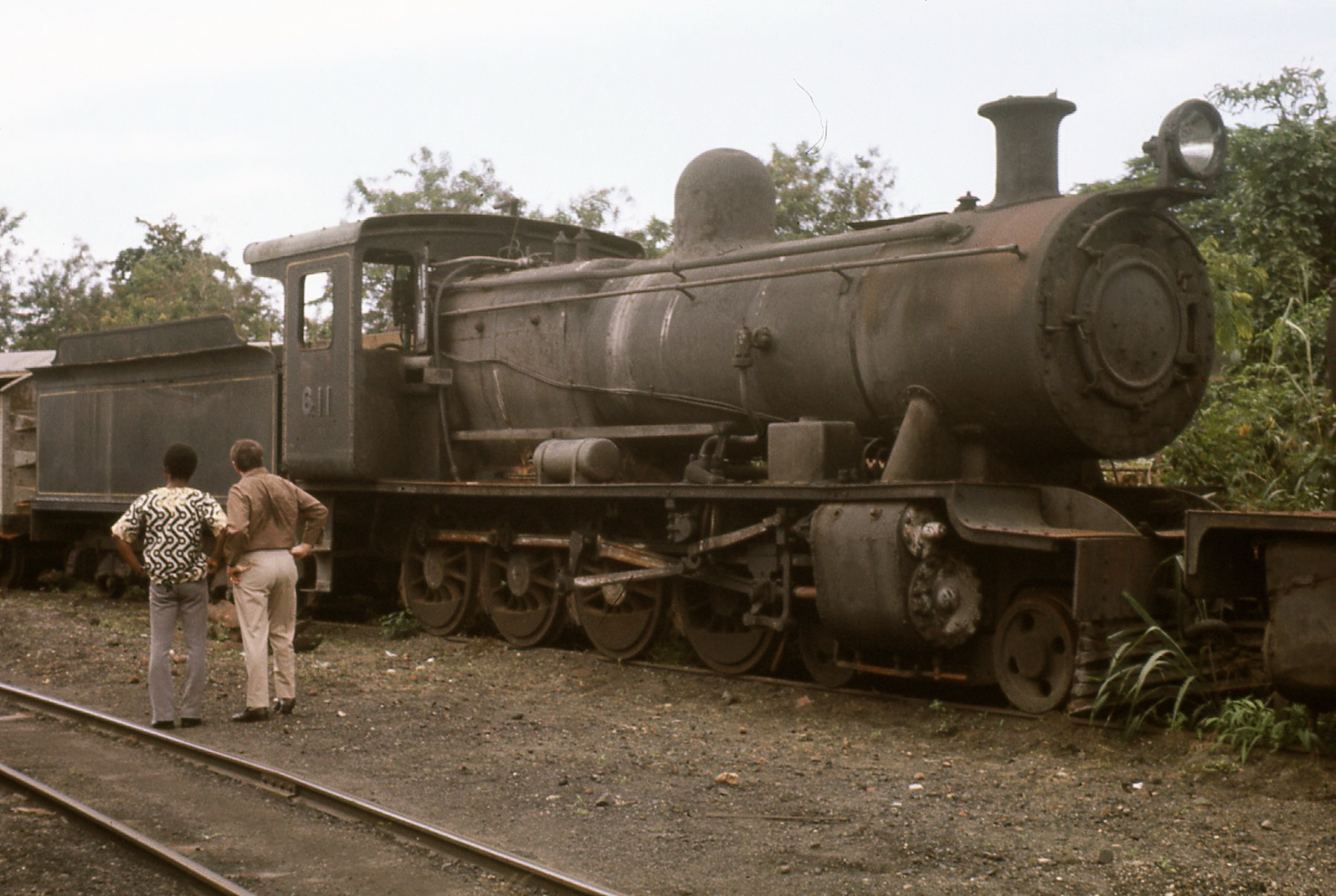
600 Class 4-8-0, Lagos 1974

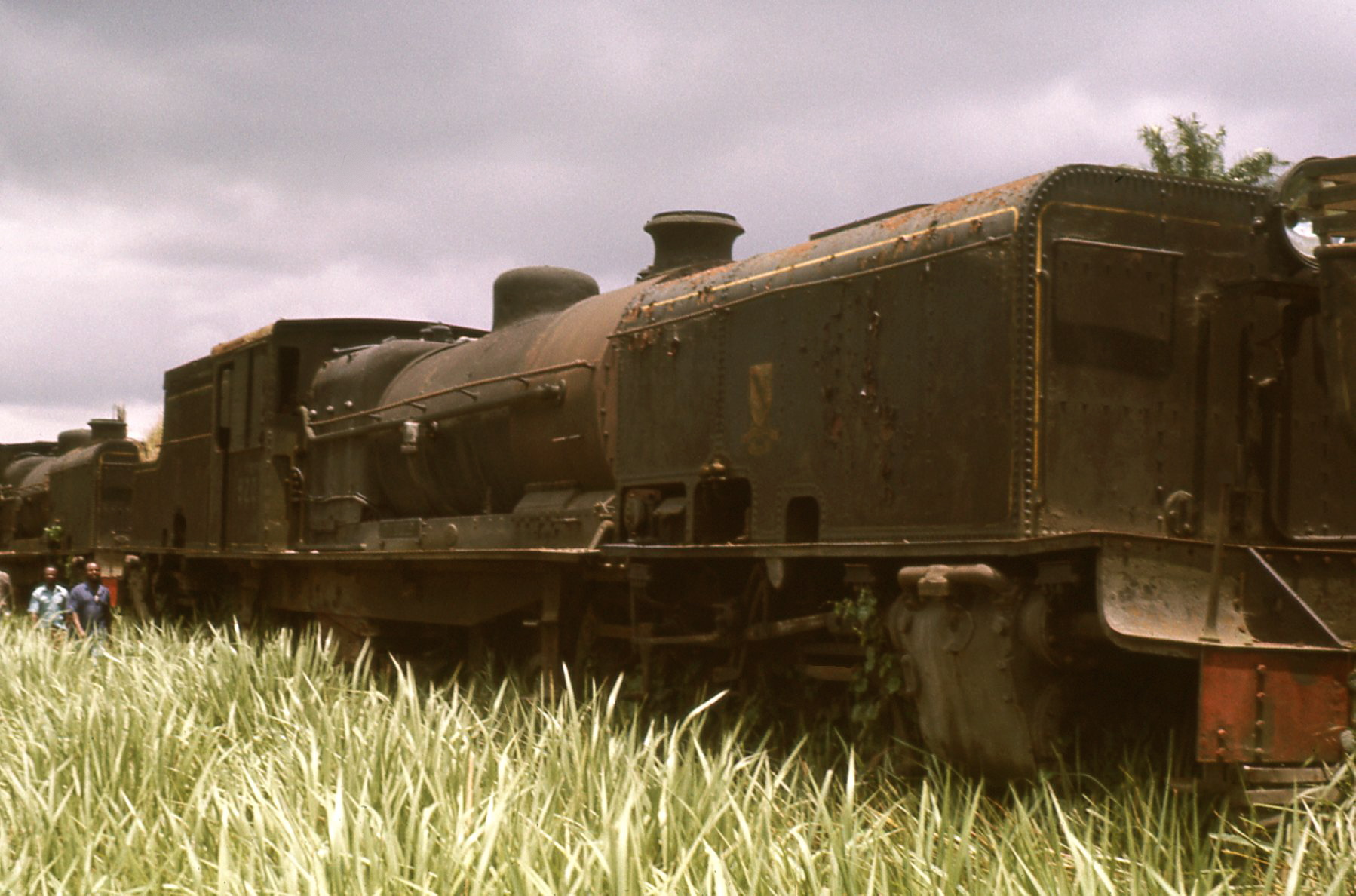
Garratt loco dumped at Lagos, 1974

(number range incomplete)

- 56 0-6-2 Built by Kitson in 1914
- 101 2-8-0 Gold Coast
- 101 0-8-0T Rebuilt
- 101 2-8-2 River 1948
- 151 4-8-0
- 157 2-8-2 “River Belwa” NBL 1949/50

River class locomotive - 2-8-2 #174-#217

- 174 2-8-2 “River Gudi”
- 207 2-8-2 "River Delimi"
- 211 2-8-2 "River Karaduwa"
- 217 2-8-2 “River Swashi”

- 221 2-8-2 “River Yunko” Vulcan Foundry 1955
- 244 4-8-0
- 255 4-8-0
- 301 4-8-0
- 401 4-6-0
- 405 4-6-2
- 451 4-6-4T
- 501 4-6-2+2-6-4 Garratt
- 601 4-8-0
- 651 2-8-2 USATC S118
- 671 4-8-0 Ex 244
- 701 4-8-2
- 751 2-8-2 Nfd Ry 1020
- 801 2-8-2
- 806 4-8-2
- 901 4-8-2+2-8-4 Garratt

=== Tank ===
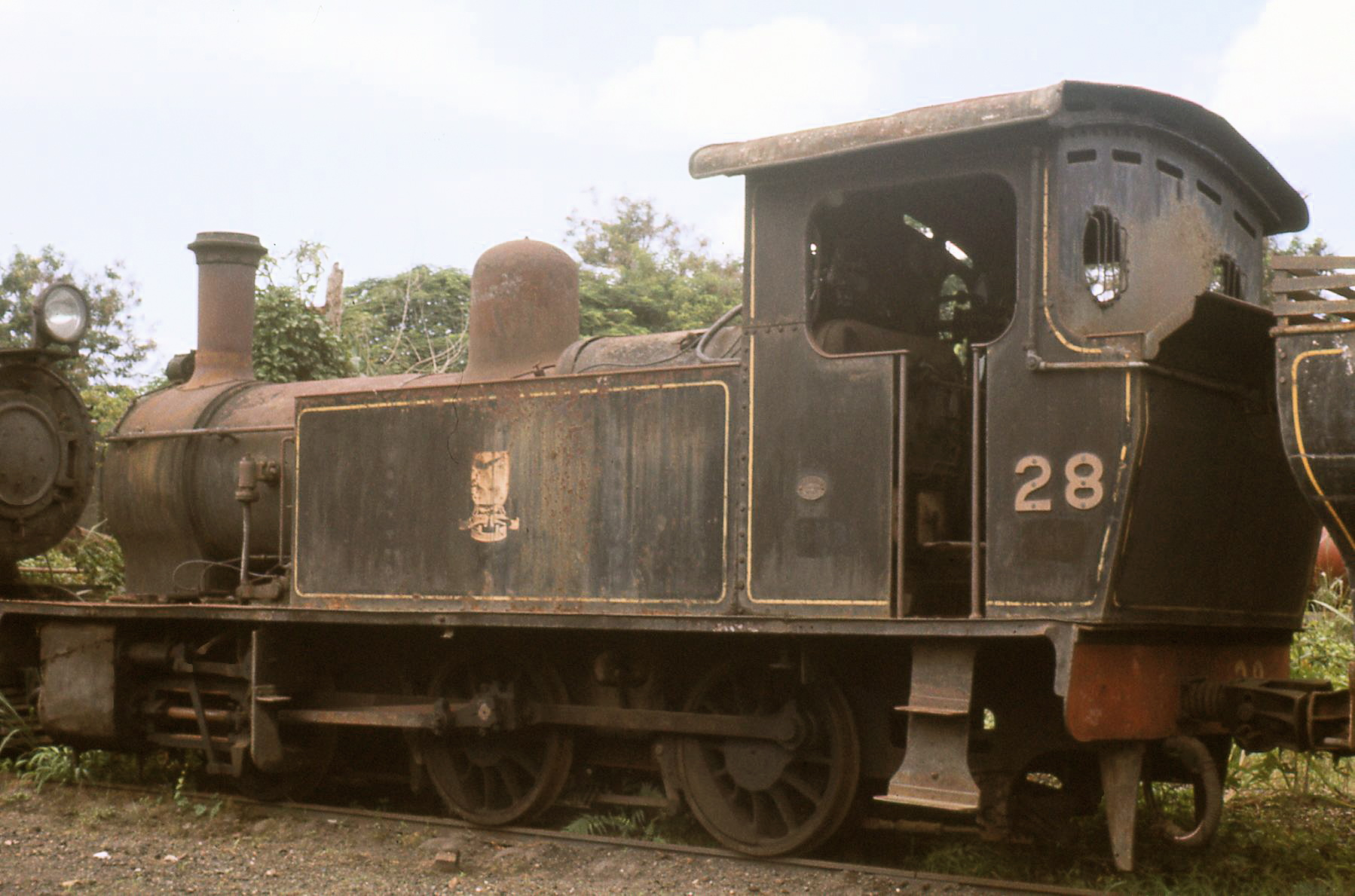
Nigerian 0-6-0T No. 28, Lagos railway compound 1974

(number range imperfect)

- 1 0-6-0T
- 4 0-6-0T "Dan Zaria" Hunslet 1921
- 4 0-6-0T Bagnall 1928
- 31 0-6-0T
- 41 2-6-2T
- 71 0-8-0T
- 74 0-8-0T Hunslet 1947

== Diesel ==
=== Main line ===
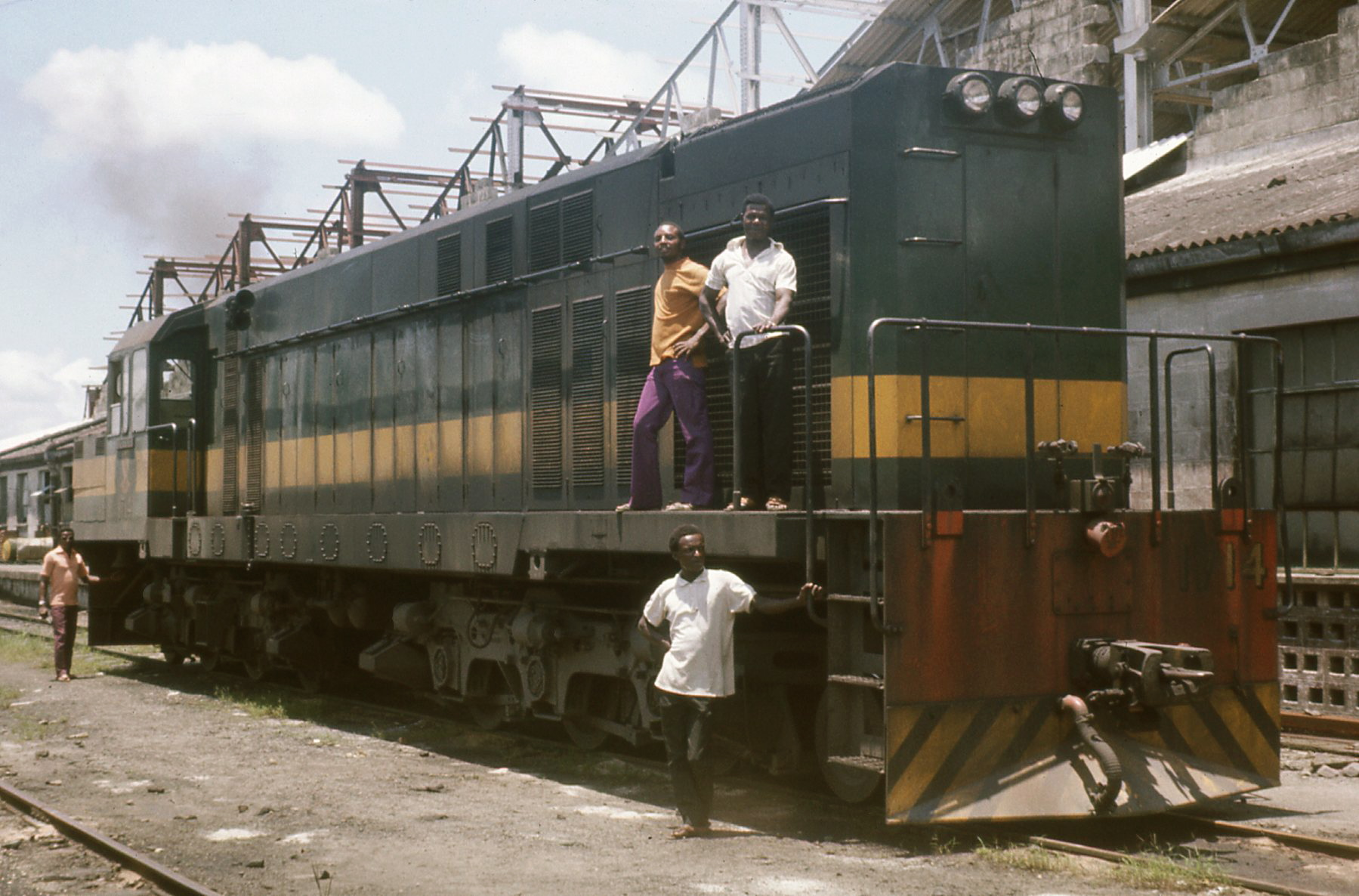
Canadian-built 1-Co-Co-1 diesel No. 1714 at Lagos in 1974

- 1001

Builder - English Electric
Date introduced - 1955
Engine - English Electric SRKT - 676 hp
Maximum speed - 55 miles per hour (89 km/h)
Wheel arrangement - Bo-Bo
Weight (in working order) - 52.76 tons
Number in class - 10

- 1101 - 1125

Builder - Electro Motive Division of General Motors
Date introduced - 1958
Engine - EMD 12-567C - 1310 hp
Maximum speed - 50 mph
Wheel arrangement - A1A-A1A
Weight (in working order) - 78.5 tons
Number in class - 25

- 1126 - 1155

Builder - Electro Motive Division of General Motors
Date introduced - 1977
Engine - EMD 12-645E - 1500 hp
Wheel arrangement - Co-Co
Weight (in working order) - 80 tons
Number in class - 30

- 1201 - 1207

Builder - Mak
Date introduced - 1961
Engine - MaK MA301FAK - 1170 hp
Maximum speed - 50 mph
Wheel arrangement - A1A-A1A
Weight (in working order) - 65.98 tons
Number in class - 7 (8th delivered in 1962)

- 1401

Builder - AEI / Metropolitan Vickers
Date introduced - 1966
Engine - Sulzer LDA28C - 1300 hp
Maximum speed - 43 mph
Wheel arrangement - Co-Co
Weight (in working order) - 77.85 tons
Number in class - 27+2

- 1601

Builder - Hitachi
Date introduced - 1972
Engine - MAN 6V 22/30ATL - 1500 hp
Wheel arrangement - 1Co-Co1
Weight (in working order) - 80 tons
Number in class - 12

- 1701

Builder - Montreal Locomotive Works (Bombardier Inc)
Date introduced - 1972
Engine - ALCO 8.251E - 1500 hp
Wheel arrangement - 1Co-Co1
Weight (in working order) - 99.41 tons
Number in class - 54

- 1801

Builder - General Electric (USA)
Date introduced - 1976
Engine - GE - FDL-12 - 2200 hp
Wheel arrangement - Co-Co
Weight (in working order) - 91.55 tons
Number in class - 6

- 1807

Builder - General Electric (USA)
Date introduced - 1977
Engine - GE FDL-8 - 1820 hp
Wheel arrangement - Co-Co
Weight (in working order) - 82.13 tons
Number in class - 45

- 1901

Builder - ABB
Date introduced - 1992
Engine - EMD 12-645E3B - 1750 hp (assumed)
Wheel arrangement - Co-Co
Weight (in working order) - 100 tons (assumed)
Number in class - 10

- 2001

Builder - Hyundai - Based on an EMD design
Date introduced - After 1991
Engine - EMD 12-645E3B (assumed)
Wheel arrangement - Co-Co
Weight (in working order) - not known
Number in class - 5

- 2101 - 2150

Builder - Dalian Locomotive and Rolling Stock Works, China
Date introduced - 1996 to '99
Engine - type not known - 3000 hp
Maximum speed - 120 km/h (75 mph)
Wheel arrangement - Co-Co
Weight (in working order) - 90 tons
Number in class - 50

=== Shunting ===
- 901

Builder - MaK
Date introduced - 1958
Engine - MaK MS304 - 388 hp
Wheel arrangement - 0-6-0DH
Weight (in working order) - 40.1 tons
Number in class - 15 (18 originally built)

- 921

Builder - Brush Traction
Date introduced - 1973/8
Engine - Ruston Paxman RPHXL MK7 - 364 hp
Wheel arrangement - 0-6-0DE
Weight (in working order) - 39.5 tons
Number in class - 42

- 891

Builder - North British
Date introduced - 1963
Engine - Paxman RPHL
Wheel arrangement - 0-8-0DH
Weight (in working order) - tons
Number in class - 2

== On order ==
- GE - 25 - due 2010
