= Lagos =

Most populous city in Nigeria

Lagos Èkó (Yoruba)
- Metropolitan city
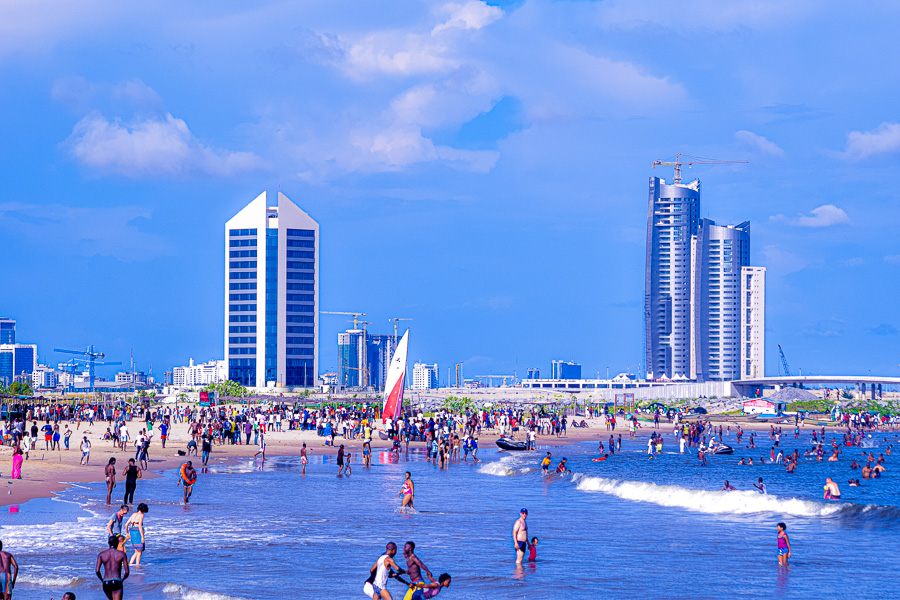
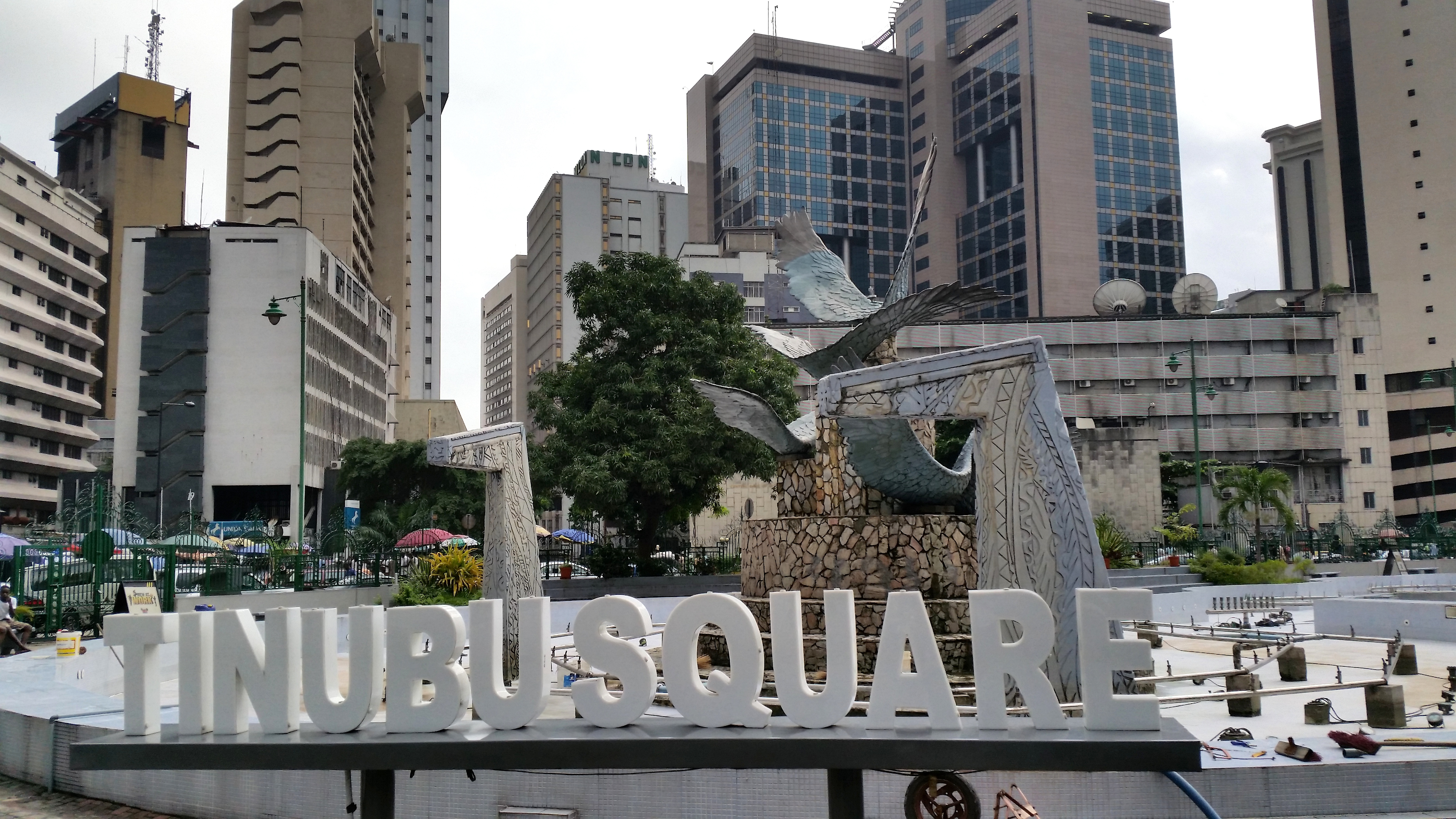
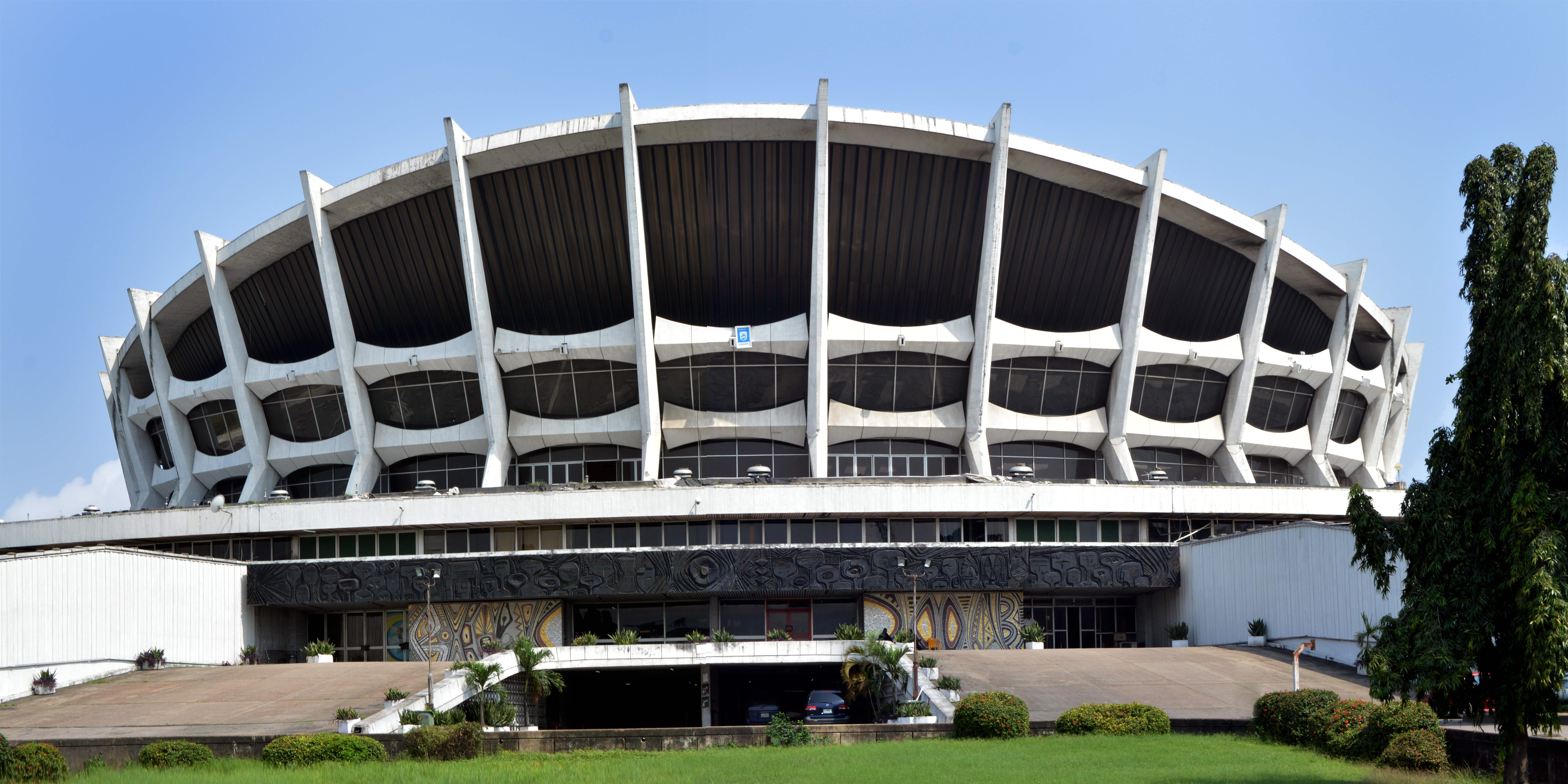
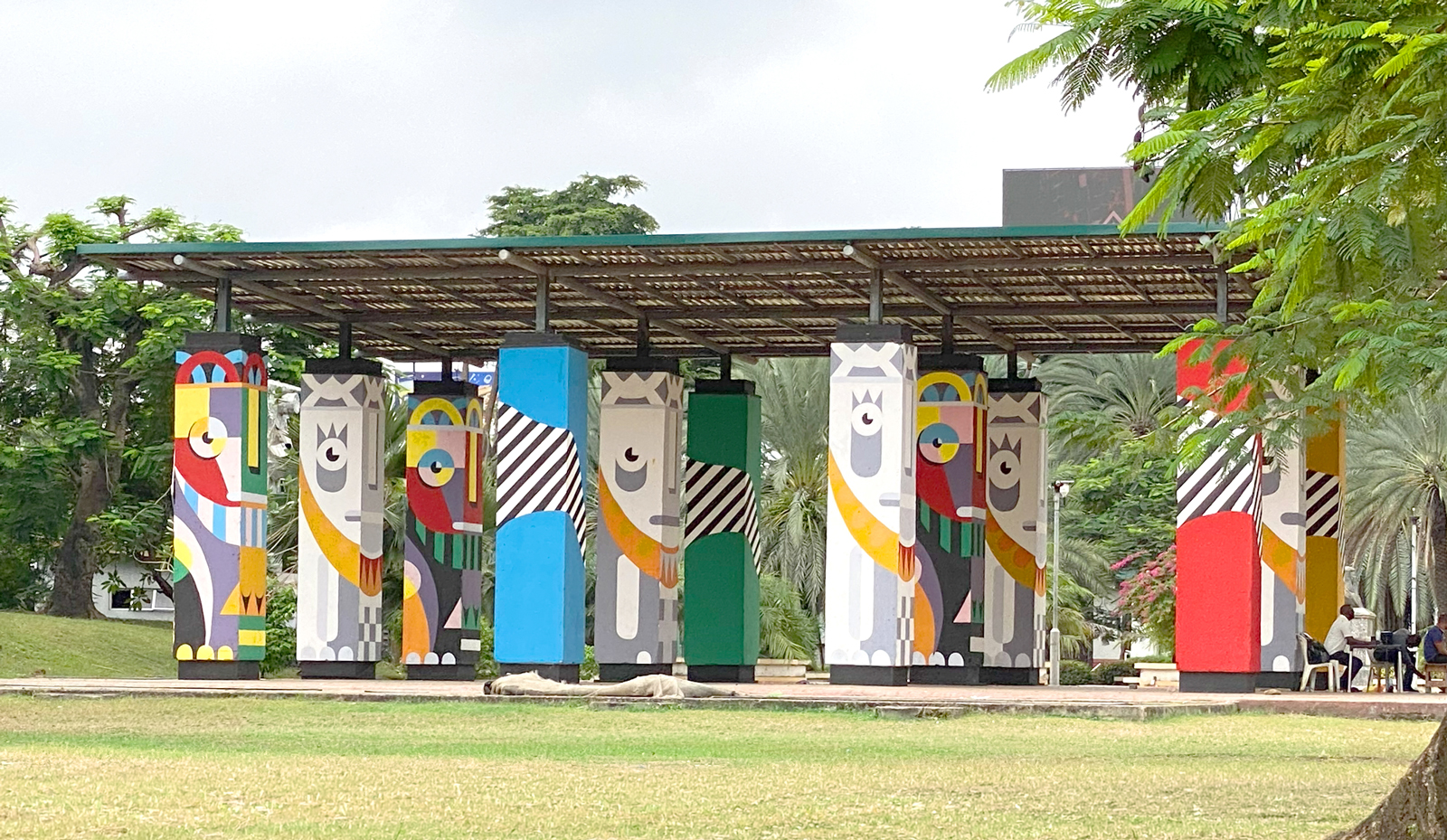
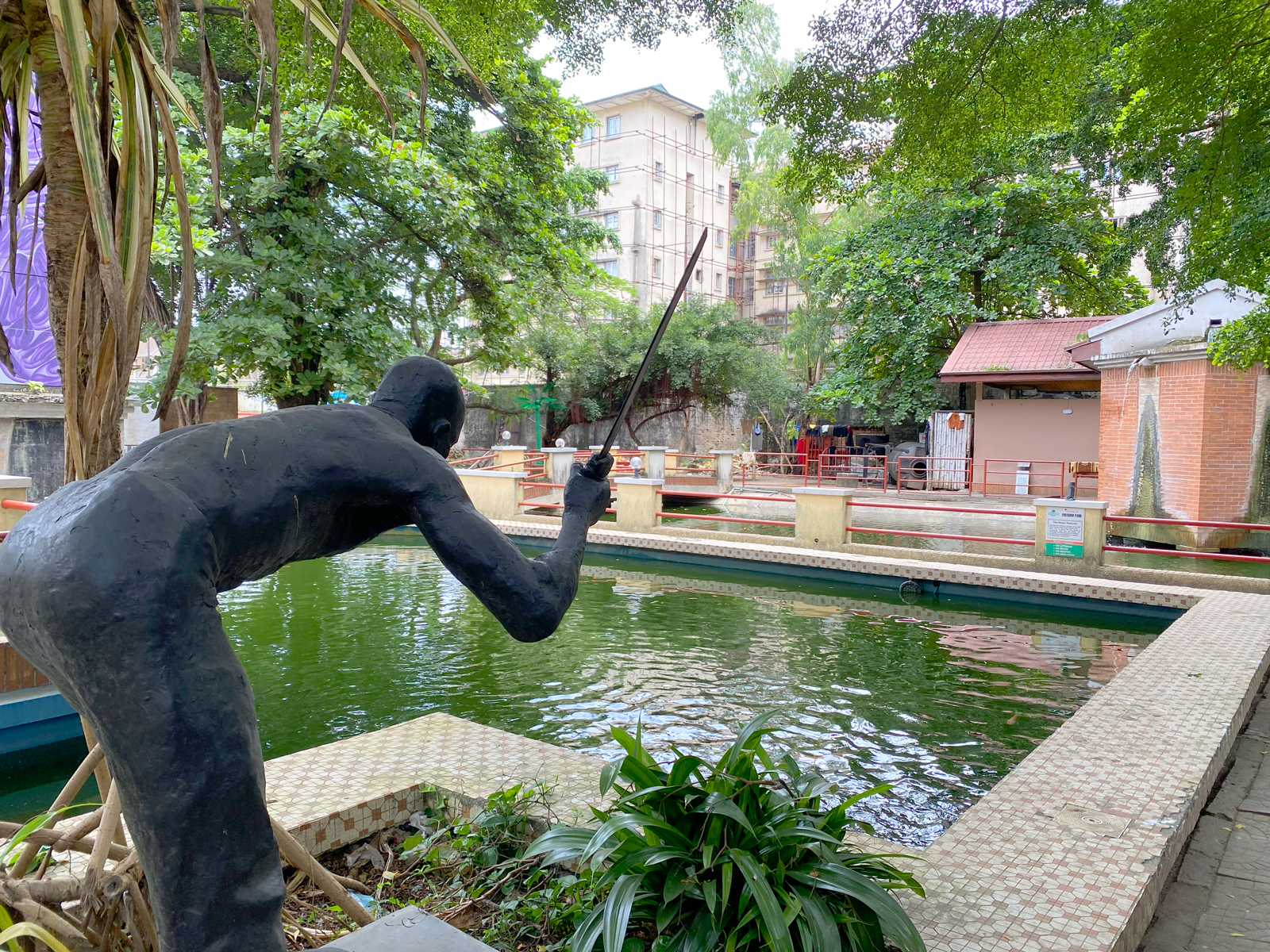
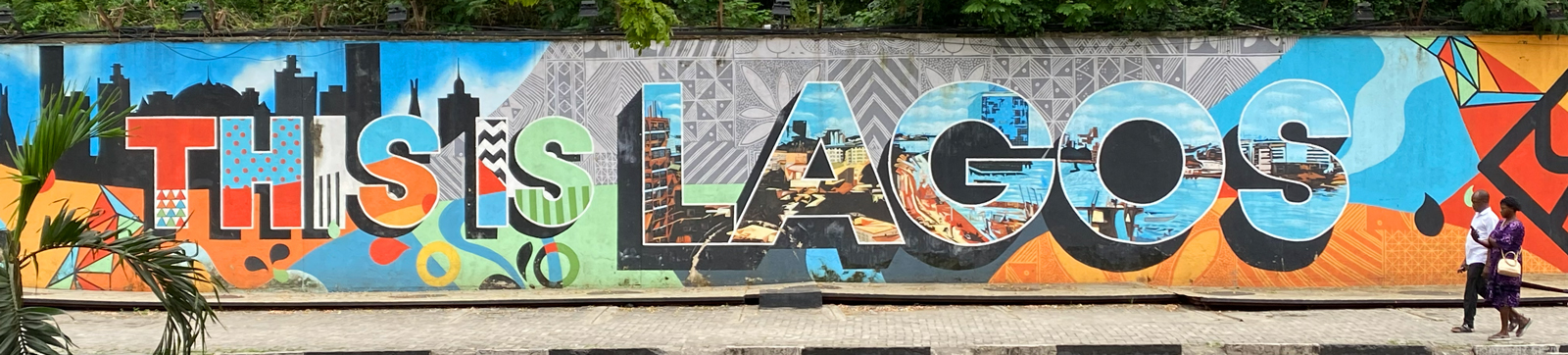
- Lagos Island, view from Victoria Island Eko Atlantic City Tinubu Square National Arts Theatre Muri Okunola Park Freedom Park Civic Tower Mural by Dennis Osadebe (wall of the Japanese embassy)
- Nicknames: Africa's Big Apple, Èkó Àkéte, Lasgidi
- Motto: Èkó ò ní bàjẹ́! (Yoruba: lit. "Lagos will not spoil!"; colloquially, "Lagos will prevail!")
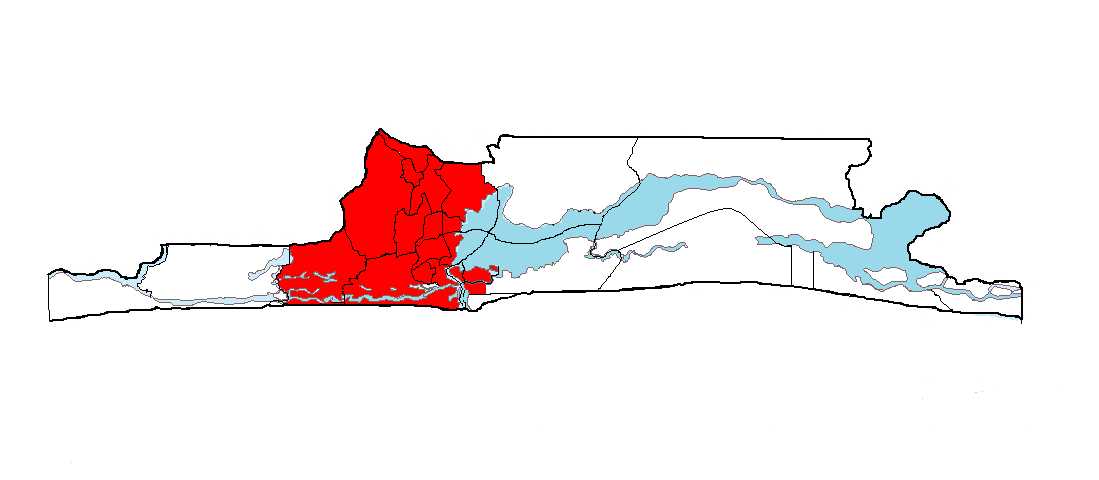
- Lagos shown within the State of Lagos

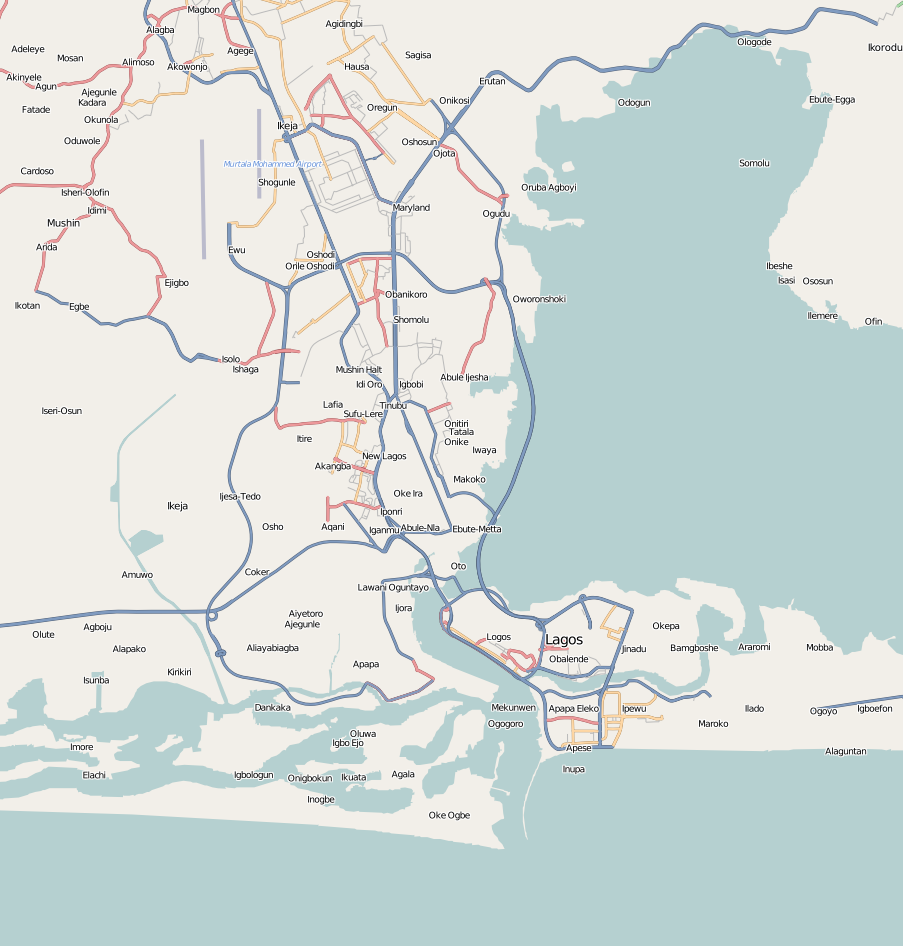
- Location of Lagos in Nigeria Lagos (Nigeria) Lagos (Africa)
- Coordinates: 6°27′22″N 3°23′37″E
- Country: Nigeria
- State: Lagos
- LGAs (Note: Metropolitan Lagos consists of 16 of Lagos State's 20 LGAs, which excludes Badagry, Epe, Ibeju-Lekki and Ikorodu.): List of LGAs: Island; Amuwo-Odofin; Apapa; Eti-Osa (Note: Only Ikoyi-Obalande and Iru-Victoria Island LCDAs); Lagos Island; Mainland; Ajeromi-Ifelodun; Lagos Mainland; Surulere; Suburban; Agege; Alimosho; Ifako-Ijaiye; Ikeja; Kosofe; Mushin; Ojo; Oshodi-Isolo; Shomolu
- Settled: 15th century
- Founder: Awori subgroup of the Yoruba

Government
  - Governor of Lagos: Babajide Sanwo-Olu
  - Deputy Governor: Femi Hamzat
  - Supreme Judge: Kazeem Alogba

Area
  - Metropolitan city: 1,171.28 km^{2} (452.23 sq mi)
  - Land: 999.6 km^{2} (385.9 sq mi)
  - Water: 171.68 km^{2} (66.29 sq mi)
  - Urban: 907 km^{2} (350 sq mi)
  - Metro: 2,706.7 km^{2} (1,045.1 sq mi)
- Elevation: 41 m (135 ft)

Population (2006 census)
  - Metropolitan city: 8,048,430
  - Estimate (2025): 17,803,700
  - Rank: 1st in Nigeria; 2nd in Africa
  - Density: 6,871/km^{2} (17,800/sq mi)
  - Urban: 16,637,000
  - Urban density: 14,469/km^{2} (37,470/sq mi)
  - Metro: 21,000,000 (estimated)
  - Metro density: 7,759/km^{2} (20,100/sq mi)
- Demonym: Lagosian

GDP
  - Metropolis: ₦ 41.2 trillion US$ 102 billion (2021)
  - Metro: ₦ 46.2 trillion US$ 114.5 billion (2021)
- Time zone: UTC+1 (WAT)
- Area code: 0201
- Climate: Aw

Lagos (/ˈleɪɡɒs/ LAY-goss; Yoruba: Èkó [èkó]), or Lagos City, is a large metropolitan port city in southwestern Nigeria. As of November 2025, the size of the city's population has been estimated to be between 17 and 21 million residents, making Lagos the largest city in Nigeria, the most populous urban area on the African continent, and one of the fastest-growing megacities in the world. (Note: Sources:)

The lands are separated by creeks, fringing the southwest mouth of Lagos Lagoon, while being protected from the Atlantic Ocean by barrier islands and long sand spits such as Bar Beach, which stretch up to 100 kilometres (62 mi) east and west of the mouth.

With its international airport, three ports (Apapa, Tin Can Island and Lekki deep-sea port), four expressways (to Badagry, Abeokuta, Ibadan and Calabar, the latter under construction since 2023 and partially operational in 2026), and the standard-gauge rail link to Abeokuta and Ibadan, the city is well connected in terms of transport and handles 88% of Nigeria’s exports. The urban rail transit system in Lagos is regarded as one of the most modern of its kind in Africa.

Lagos is best known as the leading financial centre of West and Central Africa, with headquarters of financial institutions like Access Bank, the First Bank of Nigeria or Zenith Bank. The Nigerian Exchange Group, the main stock exchange group in Nigeria, is also located here. Other major employers include two breweries, three major shipyards and the headquarters of several African airlines. Lagos is also home to numerous pharmaceutical companies; the city is also an exhibition city: Art X Lagos is West Africa’s largest art fair, whilst Lagos Fashion Week is Africa’s largest fashion fair. It has more than 20 data centres in operation and branches of Microsoft, Equinix and Google. Five out of seven African high tech start-ups with a value above US$ 1 billion ("unicorns") are located in Lagos. The employer with the most staff is the Dangote Refinery, which, once expanded, will be the world’s largest oil refinery.

Lagos houses four public universities (LASU, UNILAG, LASUSTECH, and LASUED) and six private universities as well as scientific facilities like the Institute for Oceanography and the Institute of Medical Research. Lagos is also a cultural hub. The National Arts Theatre in Surulere, the National Gallery of Modern Art (in the same building), the Centre For Black And African Arts on Broad Street, the National Museum and the John Randle Centre for Yoruba Culture in Onikan and privately run galleries like Nike Art Gallery (West Africa's biggest art collection) display Nigerias culture. The conservatoire MUSON Centre, many local orchestras and choirs (like the Lagos City Chorale or the Cathedral Church of Christ Choir) as well as writers like Sefi Atta, Oyinkan Braithwaite and Ayòbámi Adébáyò and artists like Dotun Popoola, Peju Alatise, Idowu Sonaya and Collins Abinoro Akporode represent Lagos' creative scene. Furthermore, Lagos is the centre of media outlets and of Nigerian cinema, "Nollywood". The lagoon city also is a hot spot for West African music ("Afrobeats"); in its recording studios Nigerian stars like Wizkid, Tems, Davido, and Asake have started their careers. International stars like Paul McCartney, James Brown, Ed Sheeran and Beyoncé have recorded albums there.

== Etymology ==
Lagos is derived from the Portuguese word for "lakes". The pronunciation /ˈleɪɡɒs/ (LAY-goss) is typically standard in British and Nigerian English. The native Yoruba name Èkó is also used by Yoruba people. Lagos was most likely named after Lagos, Portugal, as it was the main centre of Portuguese maritime expeditions down the African coast in the 15th century.

== History ==
The Island of Lagos (Yoruba: Ìsàlẹ̀ Èkó) emerged as a home to the Awori people, a subgroup of the Yoruba of West Africa in the 15th century. Before then, the Awori lived in the areas centred around the present-day littoral Local Government Areas of Lagos Mainland, Eti-Osa, Amuwo-Odofin, Apapa and other parts of Lagos metropolis behind the coast, such as Agege, Shomolu, Ikeja, Oshodi-Isolo and Kosofe. Lagos Island itself was a farmstead close to the Lagoon (Ọ̀sà), where they cultivated the land and lived. "Farmstead" or "hamlet" translates to Ereko in Yoruba, from which comes the indigenous name of Lagos; Eko, which it was named by the natives from its earliest days as a farm before it was eventually permanently settled by the Aworis of nearby Iddo Island.

Due to rapid urbanization, the city expanded to the west of the lagoon to include areas in the present-day Lagos Mainland, Ajeromi-Ifelodun, and Surulere. This led to the classification of Lagos into two main areas: the Island, which was the original city of Lagos, and the Mainland, which it has since expanded into. This city area was governed directly by the Federal Government through the Lagos City Council until the creation of Lagos State in 1967, which led to the splitting of Lagos city into the present-day seven Local Government Areas (LGAs), and the addition of other towns (which now make up 13 LGAs) from the then Western Region to form the state. Present-day Lagos consists of 16 LGAs, including Ikeja, the state capital of Lagos State. While this conurbation encompasses 37% of Lagos State's total land area, it accommodates approximately 85% of the state's total population.

Lagos was the previous national capital of Nigeria, however, in February 1976, the government made the decision to relocate the capital, and initiated its removal to the inland city of Abuja in the centre of the country. After its designation, construction of the new national capital started in earnest, and on December 12 1991, the seat of government officially relocated.

== Administration ==
Lagos was formerly the capital city of Nigeria, but it has since been replaced by Abuja. Abuja officially became the capital of Nigeria on 12 December 1991, although the decision to move the federal capital had been made fifteen years earlier, in Act No. 6 of 1976. Lagos is also home to the High Court of the Lagos State Judiciary, housed in an old colonial building on Lagos Island.

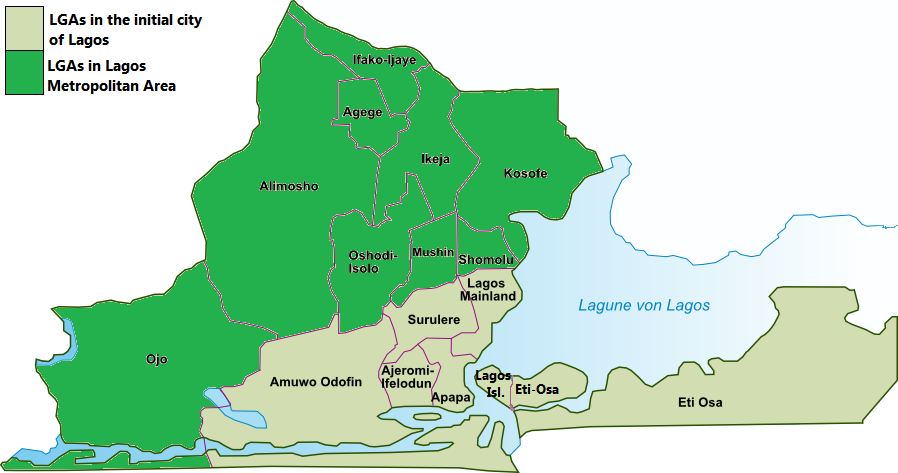
A map showing the 16 LGAs making up the Lagos Metropolitan Area

In terms of administration, Lagos is not a single municipality and therefore has no overall city administration. The geographical city limits of Metropolitan Lagos comprise 16 of the 20 Local Government Areas of Lagos State. The latter entity provides overall government for the metropolitan region. The former Municipality of Lagos, which covered Lagos Island, Ikoyi, and Victoria Island as well as some mainland territory, was managed by the Lagos City Council (LCC), but it was disbanded in 1976 and divided into several Local Government Areas (most notably Lagos Island LGA, Lagos Mainland LGA, and Eti-Osa LGA).

The mainland beyond the Municipality of Lagos, on the other hand, included several separate towns and settlements such as Mushin, Ikeja, and Agege. In the wake of the 1970s Nigerian oil boom, Lagos experienced a population explosion, untamed economic growth, and unmitigated rural migration. This caused the outlying towns and settlements to develop rapidly, thus forming the present-day "Lagos Metropolitan Area", also known as "Metropolitan Lagos". The history of Lagos is still evidenced in the layout of the LGAs that display the unique identities of the cultures that created them.

By 2006, the metro area around Lagos had extended beyond Lagos State's boundaries and attained a megacity status. This much larger area is referred to as "Greater Metropolitan Lagos" or "Lagos Megacity Region", which is a continuously built-up land area of an additional 1,535.4 square kilometres (592.8 square miles), in LGAs situated next to Lagos's eastern and western city limits in Lagos State, and also beyond its northern limits, spilling into some LGAs in adjoining Ogun State. Ogun State LGAs that have become part of Greater Metropolitan Lagos include Obafemi Owode, Sagamu, Ifo, Ado-Odo/Ota, and part of Ewekoro.

Today, the word Lagos most often refers to the urban area, called "Metropolitan Lagos" in Nigeria, which includes both the islands of the former municipality of Lagos and the mainland suburbs. The Lagos State government is responsible for some of the utilities, including roads and transportation, power, water, health, and education. Metropolitan Lagos extends over 16 of the 20 LGAs of Lagos State and contains about 85% of the population of Lagos State, including some semi-rural areas. Lagos has a considerable number of high-rise buildings that dominate its skyline. Most of the tall buildings are located in the downtown Central Business District.

== Demography ==
The population of Metropolitan Lagos is disputed. In the 2006 federal census data, the conurbation had a population of about 9 million people. However, the figure was disputed by the Lagos State Government, which later released its own population data, putting the population of Lagos Metropolitan Area at approximately 16 million. Daily, the Lagos area is growing by some 3,000 people or around 1.1 million annually, so the true population figure of the greater Lagos area in 2022 is roughly 28 million (up from some 23.5 million in 2018).

Lagos may therefore have overtaken Kinshasa as Africa's most populous city. The Lagos conurbation is part of an emerging transnational megalopolis on the coast of West Africa that includes areas in five sovereign states, the Abidjan–Lagos Corridor.

The 16 LGAs of Metropolitan Lagos
Local government area	Land area (in km^{2})	Population (2006 Census)	Population (2022 estimate)	Density (2006) (Inhabitants per km^{2})
Agege	17	459,939	683,600	41,071
Ajeromi-Ifelodun	13.9	684,105	1,017,500	55,474
Alimosho	137.8	1,277,714	1,953,500	6,899
Amuwo-Odofin	179.1	318,166	487,000	2,364
Apapa	38.5	217,362	330,100	8,153
Eti-Osa	299.1	287,785	420,100	1,496
Ifako-Ijaiye	43	427,878	633,200	16,078
Ikeja	49.92	313,196	470,200	6,785
Kosofe	84.4	665,393	1,010,800	8,174
Lagos Island	9.26	209,437	314,900	24,182
Lagos Mainland	19.62	317,720	483,600	16,322
Mushin	14.05	633,009	935,400	36,213
Ojo	182	598,071	901,800	3,781
Oshodi-Isolo	41.98	621,509	931,300	13,886
Somolu	14.6	402,673	597,400	34,862
Surulere	27.05	503,975	744,400	21,912
Metropolitan Lagos	1,171.28	7,937,932	11,914,800	7,941

Although the 2006 National Population Census of Nigeria credited the metropolitan area with a population figure of 7,937,932, the figure is at variance with some projections by the United Nations and other population agencies and groups worldwide. The population figure of Lagos State given by the Lagos State Government is 17,553,924. That figure was based on claimed conducted enumeration for social planning by the Lagos State Government's "parallel census" and it believes that since the inhabitants of the metropolitan area of Lagos constitute 88% of the Lagos State population, the population of metropolitan Lagos is about 15.5 million.

A rejoinder to Lagos State Government views concluded that Lagos State concealed the fact that the UN agencies' population projection for Lagos Urban Agglomeration had been revised downwards substantially as early as 2003. It failed to interpret the two most important and fairly representative and reliable secondary data sets already in the public domain, the National Identity Card Scheme and the 2003 Voters Registration figures from INEC. The figures for 2007 voter registration by INEC were an act sequel to the release of the provisional census results and comprehensively corroborated, vindicated, and validated the population figures. According to the official results of the 2006 census, there were 8,048,430 inhabitants in Metropolitan Lagos. This figure was lower than anticipated and has created controversy in Nigeria. Lagos Island, the central Local Government Area and historic center of Metropolitan Lagos, had a population of 212,700 at the 2006 Census.

Authorities of Lagos State have disputed the results of the 2006 census, accusing the Nigerian National Population Commission of undercounting the population of the state. This accusation is denied by the National Population Commission. A study found that research carried out by Africapolis (the African subsidiary of e-Geopolis backed by the Agence française de développement), in addition to the cross-referencing of official figures with more scientific independent research, concluded that the 2006 census figures for Lagos State of about 9 million were valid and that the state's own assessments are inflated.

Lagos is indigenous to the Yoruba people, and the Yoruba language is widely spoken. It is, by most estimates, one of the fastest-growing cities in the world. Lagos is experiencing a population increase of about 275,000 persons per annum due to the influx of people from other regions for economic purposes. In 1999, the United Nations predicted that the city's metropolitan area, which had only about 290,000 inhabitants in 1950, would exceed 20 million by 2010 and thus become one of the ten most populous cities in the world.

Historical population
Year	Pop.	±%
1950	325,218	—
1960	762,418	+134.4%
1970	1,413,528	+85.4%
1980	2,572,218	+82.0%
1990	4,764,093	+85.2%
2000	7,280,706	+52.8%
2010	10,441,182	+43.4%
2019	13,903,620	+33.2%
source: for Lagos Agglomeration

== Geography ==
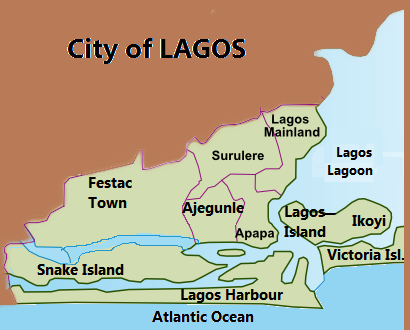
Map of Lagos's initial city boundaries, showing its contemporary districts. This definition is rarely used nowadays; the expanded metropolitan area is now a more accepted definition of Lagos.

Satellite image of Lagos

=== Cityscape ===
Lagos is loosely classified into two main geographical areas—"Lagos Island" and the "Mainland".

The historic city centre is situated in the western half of Lagos Island, within the Ring Road (E1), with Marina Road, Broad Street, Campbell Street, Igbosere Road and Bamgbose Street/Nnamdi Azikiwe Street running parallel to the coastline towards the Commodore Canal, and Balogun Street, Martin Street, Custom Street, Kakawa Street, Odunlami Street, Campos Street, Joseph Harden Street and Brook Street running perpendicular to it. As in the historic centres of other cities, this area is characterised by social hotspots, chaotic traffic conditions, unaffordable property prices and historic buildings, the proper maintenance of which the city can only afford to a limited extent.

Outside this area, there is a marked disparity in prosperity within the city, with the south-eastern part – comprising neighbourhoods such as Ikoyi, Victoria Island and Lekki, home to bank headquarters and fintech start-ups, the Free (Trade) Zone, the deep-sea port, the Dangote Refinery, hotels and tourist attractions – being described as affluent. By contrast, the western and northern outskirts of the city, with neighbourhoods such as Surelere, Oshodi and Agege, have been able to keep up only to a limited extent with the city’s rapid development since 2010.

==== Lagos Island ====
Lagos Island is surrounded by the lagoon (from which it takes its name), the Commodore Channel (which separates the island from the mainland and Apapa) and Five Cowrie Creek (which lies between it and Victoria Island respectively the Lekki Peninsula). During the colonial era, the eastern half of Lagos Island – Ikoyi – was home mainly to light-skinned residents (including a secondary school and a hospital for ‘whites’). To enforce racial segregation, an artificial canal – the McGregor Canal – was dug between the two halves of the island around 1900. This effectively made Lagos Island and Ikoyi two separate islands. In the 1970s, the canal was filled in to allow for the construction of the Ring Road (E1) around the old town centre. As a result, Ikoyi is, geographically speaking, once again part of Lagos Island – yet both halves of the island continue to exhibit completely different social and architectural structures to this day and can therefore still be regarded as distinct neighbourhoods.

Three major bridges join this Island to the Mainland. They are the Carter Bridge, which starts from Iddo; the Eko Bridge (formerly called the Second Mainland Bridge); and the Third Mainland Bridge, which passes through densely populated mainland suburbs to the Lagos Lagoon.

Lagos Island, view from Eko Atlantic (2026)

The western part of Lagos Island, together with Calabar, was one of the two starting points for British colonisation. From this strategically situated island, the British were able to control the entire wider region with little effort. Locals and slaves returning from Sierra Leone, Brazil and Cuba were able to conduct business under the protection of the Royal Navy, and turned the marshy island into what it remains today: a pre-eminent financial centre.

Lagos Island contains a central business district. This district is characterized by high-rise buildings. The Island also contains many of the city's largest wholesale marketplaces (such as the popular Idumota and Balogun Markets). It also has the National Museum of Nigeria, the Central Mosque, the Glover Memorial Hall, Christ's Church Cathedral (CMS), and the Oba's Palace (Iga Idunganran). Another major part of Lagos Island is Marina. It borders the Idumota and Balogun markets and houses major Banking institutions. Though formerly in a derelict condition, Lagos Island's Tinubu Square is a site of historical importance; it was here that the Amalgamation Ceremony that unified the North and South protectorates to form Nigeria took place in 1914.

===== Ikoyi =====
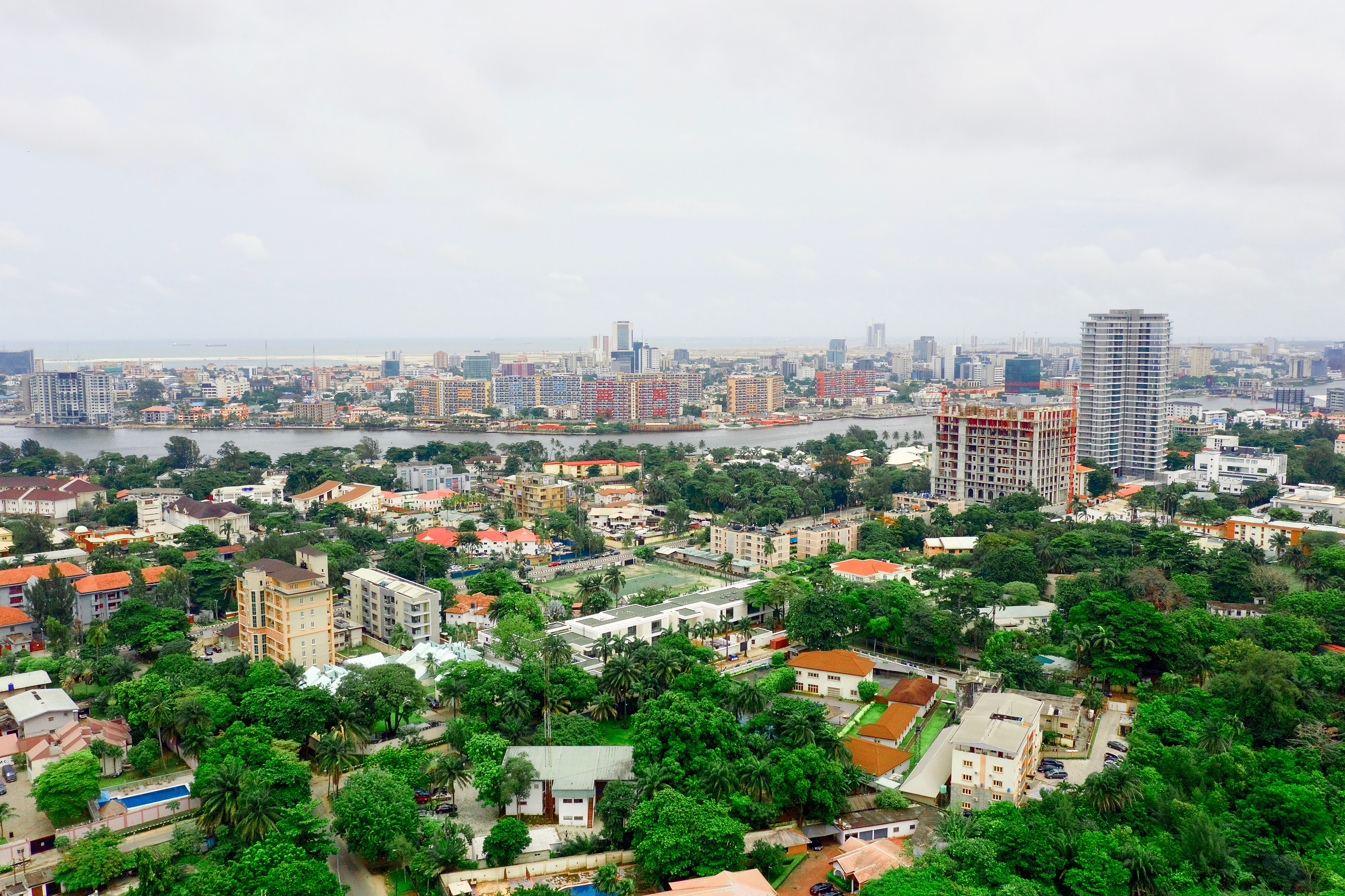
Aerial view of Ikoyi (Victoria Island in the background)

Ikoyi is situated on the eastern half of Lagos Island. Ikoyi is connected to Victoria Island by Falomo bridge, which carries the main road over Five Cowrie creek. The Ikoyi link bridge links Ikoyi and Lekki Phase 1.

Since colonial times, Ikoyi has been a neighbourhood for the more affluent, although since independence in 1960 it has no longer been exclusively for light-skinned people. Wide, well-maintained avenues with bicycle lanes and ostentatious buildings belonging to the nouveau riche characterise this neighbourhood – named after the British governors who administered Nigeria from Lagos (such as Bourdillon). Alfred Rewane Road is home to the offices of international companies such as Microsoft, Google, Dangote, Lufthansa, Samsung, BAT and others. The Ikoyi Club 1938, which was also originally an exclusively ‘white’ establishment, remains exclusive and retains its status as one of the largest and prestigious golf courses in Africa despite the astronomical property prices in the surrounding area. The Dodan Barracks (originally built in Ikoyi by the colonial rulers to protect them against uprisings from other parts of the city) served as Nigeria’s centre of power during the military dictatorships until the 1990s, when Abuja became the new capital. Military ruler Murtala Muhammed was assassinated by coup plotters in 1976 near the barracks on Ikoyi Road – a memorial commemorates him. Radio Nigeria has been broadcasting from Ikoyi since colonial times and was for a long time the country’s only mass medium. The Federal High Court of Nigeria also resides in Ikoyi.

===== Victoria Island =====
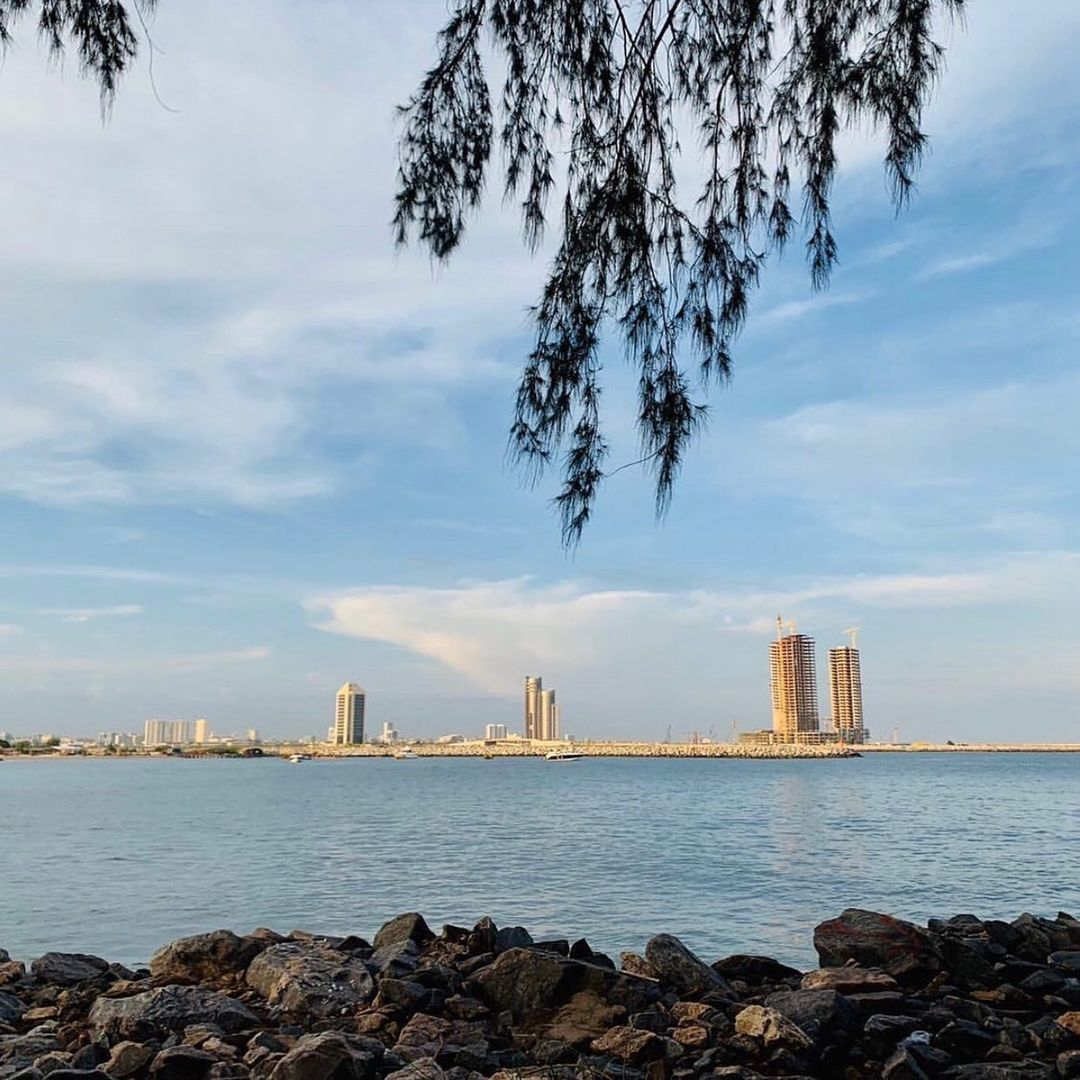
Eko Atlantic, a project at the mouth of Lagos Lagoon under construction, extending and further developing Victoria Island (as seen from Tarkwa Bay Beach)

Victoria Island with its annex is situated to the south of Lagos Island and known with a zip code of 101241 as assigned by NIPOST. It has expensive real estate properties and for that reason, many new luxury condos and apartments. Along with Ikoyi, Victoria Island occupies a major area in Lagos that boasts several shopping districts. On its seashore along the Atlantic front, there is an environmentally reconstructed Bar Beach.

===== Ajah/Lekki =====
The Lekki Peninsula shares some prestige with its Ikoyi and Victoria Island neighbours. Development has stretched the piece of land further such that the Ibeju axis, though closer to Epe (which is on the outskirts of Lagos) is almost always described as part of Lekki. The expanse of land starts from the Lekki toll gate, which was the focal stage of the famous #EndSars protest in October 2020, and ends in Ibeju-Lekki and boasts of communities slowly inching their way to suburb status such as Ajah, Awoyaya, Sangotedo, Abijo, and Eputu. There is quite a bit of place to see – the Lekki Conservation Centre; The Novare Mall; The Lekki Free Trade Zone – Dangote, Africa's richest man is building his refinery in this FTZ; Lagos Business School; Eleko Beach; Elegushi Beach; La Campagne Tropicana – a beach/tourist getaway, Pan-Atlantic University. The area has a Catholic monastery.

===== Iddo =====
Across the main channel of the lagoon from Lagos Island, there is a smaller settlement called Iddo. Iddo is also a railroad terminus and it is now situated in the Lagos Mainland Local Government Area after it was connected to the Mainland like a peninsula.

==== Mainland ====
A huge population of Lagosians also live on the Lagos Mainland, and most industries are located there. The Mainland is known for its music and nightlife, which used to be located in areas around Yaba, Ikeja, and Surulere. However, in recent years more nightclubs have sprung up on the Island, making the Island (particularly Victoria Island, Ikate, and Lekki Phase 1) the main nightlife attraction. Mainland LGAs include Surulere, Apapa, and Lagos Mainland. Metropolitan Lagos suburban LGAs include: Agege, Amuwo Odofin, Mushin, Oshodi-Isolo and Ikeja (site of Murtala Muhammed International Airport and the capital of Lagos State).

Major areas on the Mainland include Ebute Metta, Yaba and Ejigbo. Some rivers, like Badagry Creek, flow parallel to the coast for some distance before exiting through the sand bars to the sea.

== Climate ==
Lagos experiences a tropical savanna climate (Aw) according to the Köppen climate classification, as there are three months under 60 millimetres or 2.4 inches of rain, and annual rainfall is not nearly high enough for tropical monsoon classification. The wet season starts in May and ends in October, while the dry season starts in November and ends in April. There is also a short dry season from July to August. The wettest month is June with precipitation total 316 millimetres or 12.44 inches, while the driest month is January with precipitation total 13 millimetres or 0.51 inches.

Located near the equator, Lagos has only a slight seasonal temperature variation, with mean high temperatures ranging from 28 to 32 °C (82 to 90 °F). Lagos has the highest temperatures in March with a daily range from 26 to 32 °C (79 to 90 °F), and least hot temperatures in August ranging from 24 to 28 °C (75 to 82 °F), not unlike the seasons of coastal locations in the Southern Hemisphere. Summer is the coolest season, with June and September are the coldest and rainiest months, while spring (March - May) is the hottest season.

Climate data for Lagos Island, 1991–2020 normals and records
Month	Jan	Feb	Mar	Apr	May	Jun	Jul	Aug	Sep	Oct	Nov	Dec	Year
Record high °C (°F)	36.0 (96.8)	39.0 (102.2)	40.1 (104.2)	36.6 (97.9)	36.7 (98.1)	33.8 (92.8)	33.0 (91.4)	36.0 (96.8)	34.6 (94.3)	35.5 (95.9)	36.0 (96.8)	36.8 (98.2)	40.1 (104.2)
Mean daily maximum °C (°F)	31.5 (88.7)	32.1 (89.8)	32.2 (90.0)	31.6 (88.9)	30.9 (87.6)	29.4 (84.9)	28.4 (83.1)	28.2 (82.8)	29.1 (84.4)	30.1 (86.2)	31.4 (88.5)	31.6 (88.9)	30.5 (87.0)
Daily mean °C (°F)	28.2 (82.8)	28.9 (84.0)	29.2 (84.6)	28.7 (83.7)	28.0 (82.4)	26.7 (80.1)	26.1 (79.0)	26.0 (78.8)	26.6 (79.9)	27.3 (81.1)	28.3 (82.9)	27.8 (82.0)	27.7 (81.8)
Mean daily minimum °C (°F)	24.9 (76.8)	25.7 (78.3)	26.1 (79.0)	25.8 (78.4)	25.1 (77.2)	24.1 (75.4)	23.8 (74.8)	23.8 (74.8)	24.0 (75.2)	24.5 (76.1)	25.3 (77.5)	24.1 (75.4)	24.8 (76.6)
Record low °C (°F)	18.5 (65.3)	15.9 (60.6)	20.2 (68.4)	19.8 (67.6)	18.4 (65.1)	17.6 (63.7)	15.7 (60.3)	18.6 (65.5)	18.6 (65.5)	17.0 (62.6)	14.0 (57.2)	13.7 (56.7)	13.7 (56.7)
Average precipitation mm (inches)	10.5 (0.41)	40.9 (1.61)	68.4 (2.69)	145.5 (5.73)	235.8 (9.28)	433.7 (17.07)	208.9 (8.22)	91.4 (3.60)	217.9 (8.58)	189.1 (7.44)	51.5 (2.03)	9.7 (0.38)	1,703.3 (67.04)
Average precipitation days (≥ 1 mm)	1.0	2.2	4.3	6.9	11.3	15.6	10.8	7.2	12.3	10.5	3.4	0.7	86.2
Average relative humidity (%)	77.7	81.3	84.2	86.0	86.7	88.2	88.5	88.0	89.0	88.2	84.3	78.8	85.1
Average dew point °C (°F)	23.9 (75.0)	25.4 (77.7)	26.2 (79.2)	26.1 (79.0)	25.6 (78.1)	24.6 (76.3)	24.0 (75.2)	23.9 (75.0)	24.6 (76.3)	25.2 (77.4)	25.4 (77.7)	23.8 (74.8)	24.9 (76.8)
Mean monthly sunshine hours	164	168	174	189	176	114	99	105	121	167	186	197	1,843
Mean daily sunshine hours	5	6	6	7	6	4	3	3	4	5	6	7	5
Source 1: NOAA (monthly sun hours 1961–1990)
Source 2: Meteo Climat (record highs and lows) Weather Atlas (daily sun hours)

=== Climate change ===
A 2019 paper published in PLOS One estimated that under Representative Concentration Pathway 4.5, a "moderate" scenario of climate change where global warming reaches ~2.5–3 °C (4.5–5.4 °F) by 2100, the climate of Lagos in the year 2050 would most closely resemble the current climate of Panama City. The annual temperature would increase by 1.6 °C (2.9 °F) and the temperature of the warmest month by 1.5 °C (2.7 °F), while the temperature of the coldest month would be 2.9 °C (5.2 °F) higher. According to Climate Action Tracker, the current warming trajectory appears consistent with 2.7 °C (4.9 °F), which closely matches RCP 4.5.

Moreover, according to the 2022 IPCC Sixth Assessment Report, Lagos is one of 12 major African cities (Abidjan, Alexandria, Algiers, Cape Town, Casablanca, Dakar, Dar es Salaam, Durban, Lagos, Lomé, Luanda and Maputo) that would be the most severely affected by sea level rise. It estimates that they would collectively sustain cumulative damage of US$65 billion under RCP 4.5 and US$86.5 billion in the high-emission scenario RCP 8.5 by the year 2050. Additionally, RCP 8.5 combined with the hypothetical impact from marine ice sheet instability at high levels of warming would involve up to US$137.5 billion in damage, while the additional accounting for the "low-probability, high-damage events" may increase aggregate risks to US$187 billion for the "moderate" RCP4.5, US$206 billion for RCP8.5 and US$397 billion under the high-end ice sheet instability scenario. Since sea level rise would continue for about 10,000 years under every scenario of climate change, future costs of sea level rise would only increase, especially without adaptation measures. Sea level rise is being exacerbated by subsidence, which is occurring at up to 87 millimetres (3.4 in) per year.

== Economy ==
The city of Lagos is a major economic focal point in Nigeria, generating around 30-35% of the country's GDP. Most commercial and financial businesses are carried out in the central business district situated on the island. This is also where most of the country's commercial banks, financial institutions, and major corporations are headquartered. Lagos is also the major information communications and telecommunications (ICT) hub of West Africa. Lagos is developing a 24-hour economy. Yves Bellinghausen summed up the city’s economy as follows: 'Lagos is Africa's Hollywood, Manhattan, and Silicon Valley all rolled into one.'

The globalisation of Lagos's economy is rated "beta minus" by the GaWC. This is equivalent to Manchester or Edinburgh in the UK. Lagos is thus the most "globalised" city in West and Central Africa. 5 out of 7 African tech "unicorns" operate out of Lagos (see below). Lagos is home to more tech centres than any other city in Africa.

=== Financial institutions ===
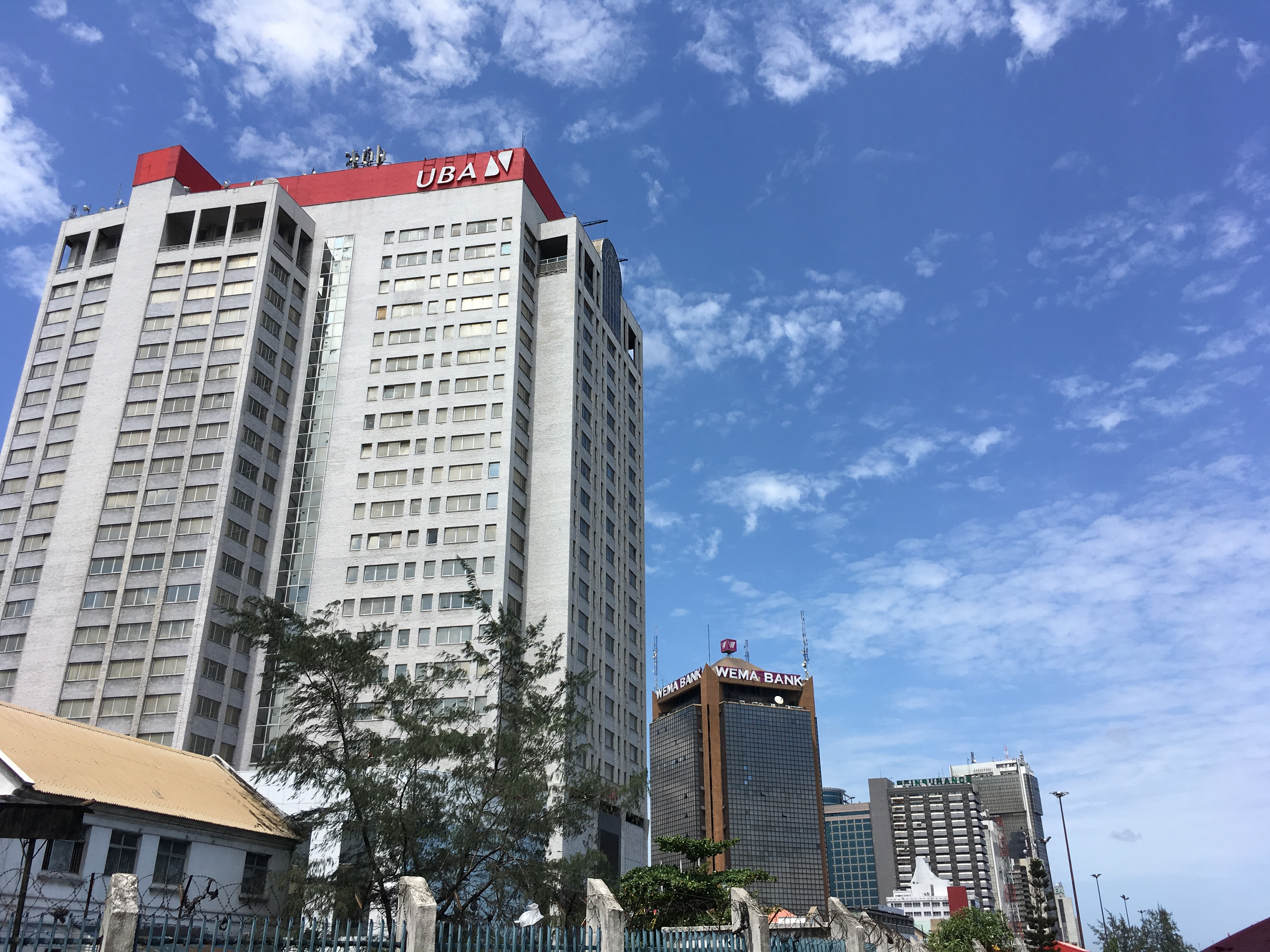
Financial district of Lagos

Lagos is a major financial and banking centre. The four largest banks in West and Central Africa are headquartered in Lagos, and another nine banks in Lagos are among the 20 largest banks in the region. Zenith Bank, Access Bank, Guaranty Trust Bank and First Bank have capital of more than US$2 billion each. Banking headquarters are located on Victoria Island and Lagos Island.

The national stock exchange, the Nigerian Stock Exchange, is also located here (in the background on the right in the adjacent picture). Furthermore, the NASD OTC Securities Exchange (on the left, in the light-coloured building) and the FMDQ Group are based here on Victoria Island.

The insurance industry in Nigeria is comparatively and modestly developed, with an industry turnover of around US$1 billion per year. As with the banks, the headquarters of the insurance companies are predominantly located in Lagos.

=== Ports, shipyards ===
Entrance of the Lekki Deep Sea Port

The Port of Lagos, formally known as the Lagos-Elbert Mathews Memorial Port, is Nigeria's leading port and one of the largest and busiest Ports in Africa. Due to the large urban population, Lagos is categorized as a medium-port megacity using the Southampton System for port-city classification. It is administered by the Nigerian Ports Authority.

The Port of Lagos / Apapa is the oldest and largest port in the country, both in terms of land area and cargo volume handled. More than half of Nigeria's maritime trade is handled here, and the port also acts as a transhipment point for landlocked countries such as Chad and Niger. Around 1,000 ships with 5,700,000 tonnes of cargo call at the Lagos port complex annually. Tin Can Island Port is located west of Apapa near the Lagos Port Complex. It was established in 1975. In early 2023, the deep sea port of Lekki was commissioned 50 km east of Lagos. This thus does not belong to the urban area of Lagos but to the state of the same name. In 2025, a decision was taken to modernise the ports of Apapa and Tin Can Island at a cost of one billion US dollars. The fourth (and easternmost) port in Lagos worth mentioning is the port of the Dangote Refinery, which supplies the refinery with crude oil from the Niger Delta or, for example, from Angola, and ships out products such as petrol and kerosene.

Three of Nigeria’s four largest shipyards are located in Lagos: Nigerdock on Snake Island, Naval Dockyard Limited on Victoria Island and Samsung Heavy Industries Mega Construction Yard at Tarkwa Bay. Nigerdock is the largest shipyard in West Africa. It is situated in the Snake Island Integrated Free Zone and boasts the country’s largest dry dock (25,000 DWT). It is a major hub for shipbuilding, ship repair, oil and gas production. Naval Dockyard Limited, formerly known as the Nigerian Naval Dockyard, is a shipbuilding and repair facility established by the Federal Government of Nigeria and transferred to the Nigerian Navy. Its operations have expanded beyond naval vessel maintenance to include services for merchant shipping and the oil and gas industry. Samsung Heavy Industries Mega Construction Yard is a huge integrated shipyard built primarily for the assembly of extremely large floating production, storage and offloading units (FPSOs) and for heavy shipbuilding.

=== Entertainment industry and media ===
==== Nollywood ====
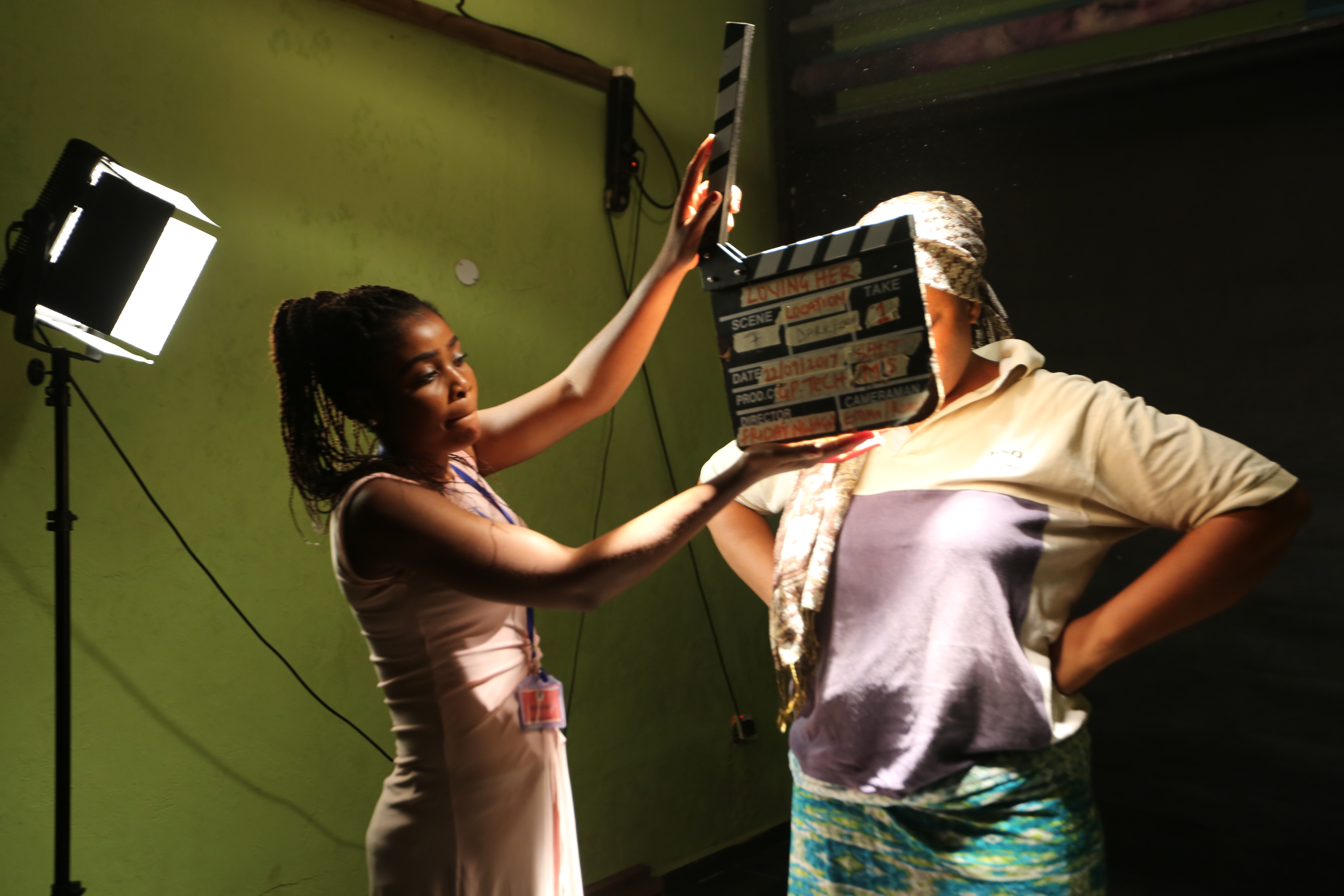
Filming set in Lagos

Lagos is the centre of the West African film, music, and TV industries. The film industry in the Surulere locality ranks second or third in the world, ahead of or behind Hollywood, depending on the survey. PricewaterhouseCoopers Int. forecasts that the Nigerian entertainment industry will grow 85% to $15 billion. Since the success of the Nigerian thriller "The Figurine", Nigerian film has increasingly turned to high-quality productions that are also commercially successful. This, in turn, has led to consistently new box office revenue records in Nigeria (2009's "The Figurine", 2013's "Half of a Yellow Sun", 2016's "The Wedding Party", 2023's "Battle on Buka Street").

==== Newspapers ====
In Nigeria, newspapers are available in digital format and are predominantly produced in Lagos. The most widely read newspaper in Lagos, by its own account, is Punch. The Vanguard newspaper is one of the few dailies that is not only available online but also in print. Other publications include The Guardian, The Nation, The Sun and the Nigerian Tribune. The latter was founded in colonial times, in 1949.

==== Television ====
The most watched television station in Lagos (and in Nigeria) is the 24-hour news channel Channels TV, based in Lagos. Some of its presenters use an overly correct standard of British English that compatriots like to mock. The same can be said of Arise TV and the state broadcaster NTA. The private African Independent Television focuses on entertainment and infotainment. Programmes in pidgin English or in Yoruba have moved to digital streaming services and offer action films, comedies and heartbreak productions.

=== "Africa's Silicon Valley" ===
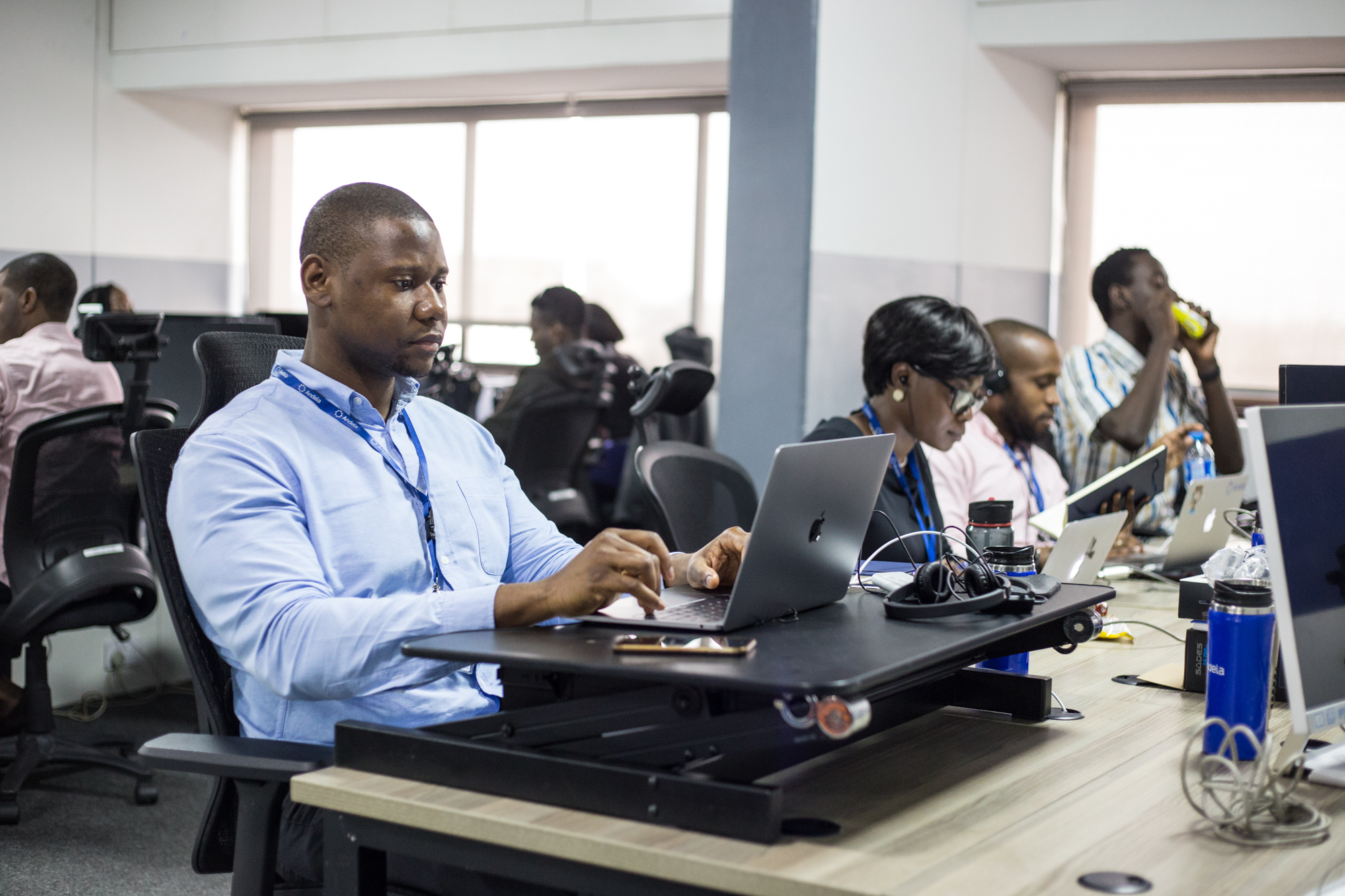
IT trainer and recruiter Andela, Lagos

Seven tech start-ups in Africa are said to have "unicorn" status (worth over 1 billion euros). Five of them are based in Lagos: Flutterwave is in the virtual bank card business. Opay and Interswitch are platforms for online bookings. Andela trains software engineers and places them in the Nigerian labour market. Jumia is an online retail company that offers a wide range of products such as electronic devices and fashion.

Lagos is home to more tech hubs than any other city in Africa. With more than 90 million internet users, Lagos is attracting investors who want to capitalise on this expanding technology hotspot. Startupgrind.com refers to Lagos as "Africa's Silicon Valley". Bloomberg highlights "Nigeria's Chaotic Rise as the Tech Heart of Africa" and means Lagos, specifically the Yaba district.

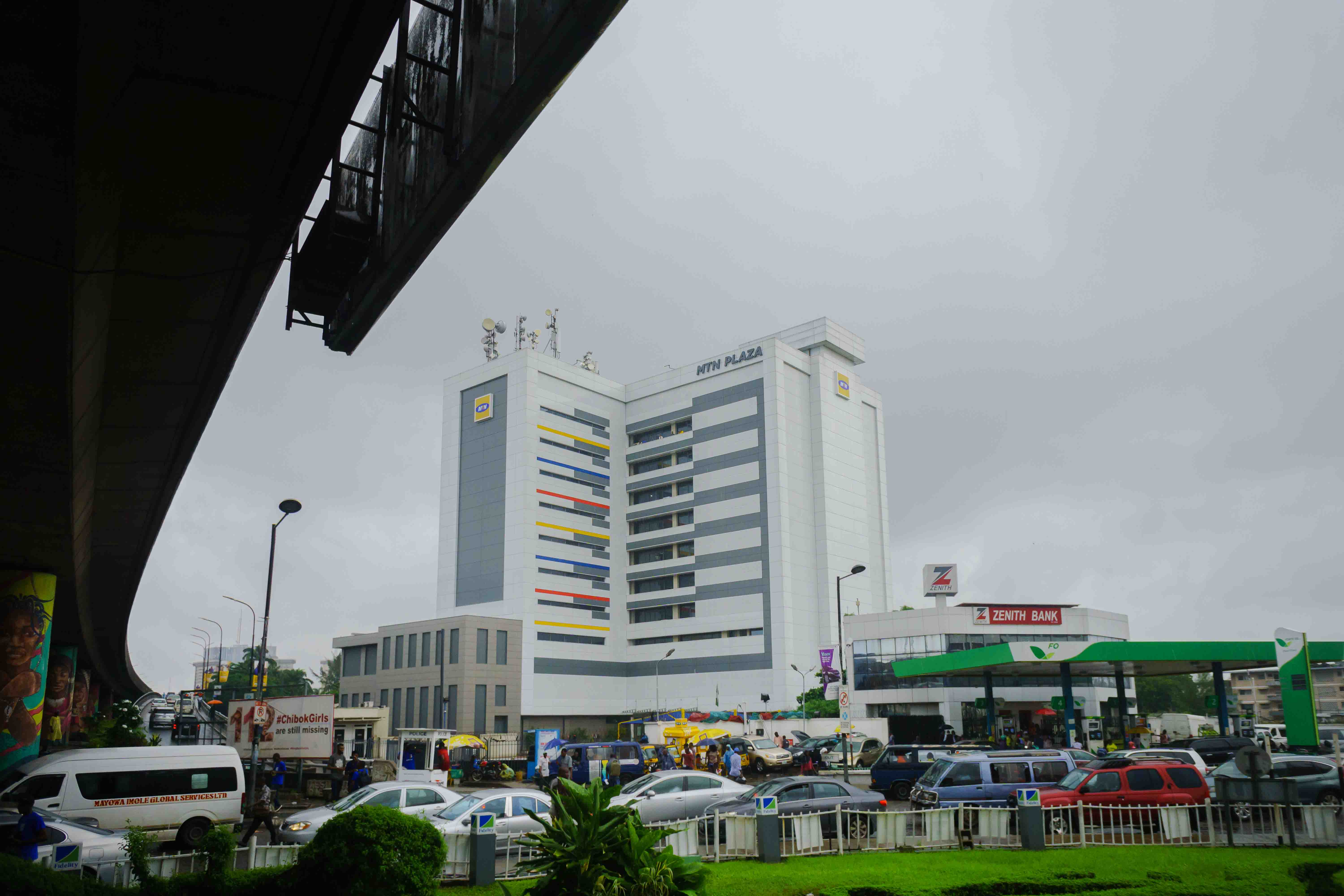
MTN in Lagos

Lagos is the only African city to have both a Google and a Microsoft office. MTN maintains the first and still predominant 4G network in Nigeria. Airtel is another 4G provider. 9Mobile and Dataflex are Internet providers. Paystack is used by Nigerians who regularly receive payments from abroad. ULesson maintains a platform on which secondary school learning content is presented. Hotels.ng allows hotel bookings to be made throughout Africa.

=== Oil refinery ===
For decades, there was no oil processing industry in Nigeria, apart from illegal refineries in the Niger Delta (which are very polluting due to the lack of cracking). Nigeria therefore had to have the end products of domestic crude oil such as fuels, bitumen, paraffin, motor oil, polypropylene etc. produced in US or European refineries, with transport costs over thousands of nautical miles and margins for middlemen. The oil refinery in Lekki went into operation in December 2023 and presently produces 650,000 barrels of oil per day, with plans to expand capacity to 14 million barrels per day.

In October 2025, Dangote announced plans to more than double the daily capacity of the Lekki refinery to 1.4 million barrels at a cost of USD 350 million. This would make Lekki the largest refinery in the world. During the same period, the neighbouring states of Ogun and Ondo announced their own plans to build oil refineries: Ogun on Tongeji Island near Ipokia (close to Badagry) and Ondo in the ‘Sunshine Free Trade Zone Igotiri’ in Ilaje, 50 km east of the Lekki refinery.

=== Fertiliser plant ===
Since 2022, a new fertiliser production plant has been producing 3 million tonnes of fertiliser a year (roughly equivalent to Germany's fertiliser consumption). With no more Russian fertiliser coming onto the world market in 2022 due to this country's invasion of Ukraine, Nigeria is stepping into a gap in the market. "The fertiliser market is a seller's market," company owner Dangote raves. "People are begging for us to sell and we are choosy about who we sell to."

=== Pharmaceutical industry ===
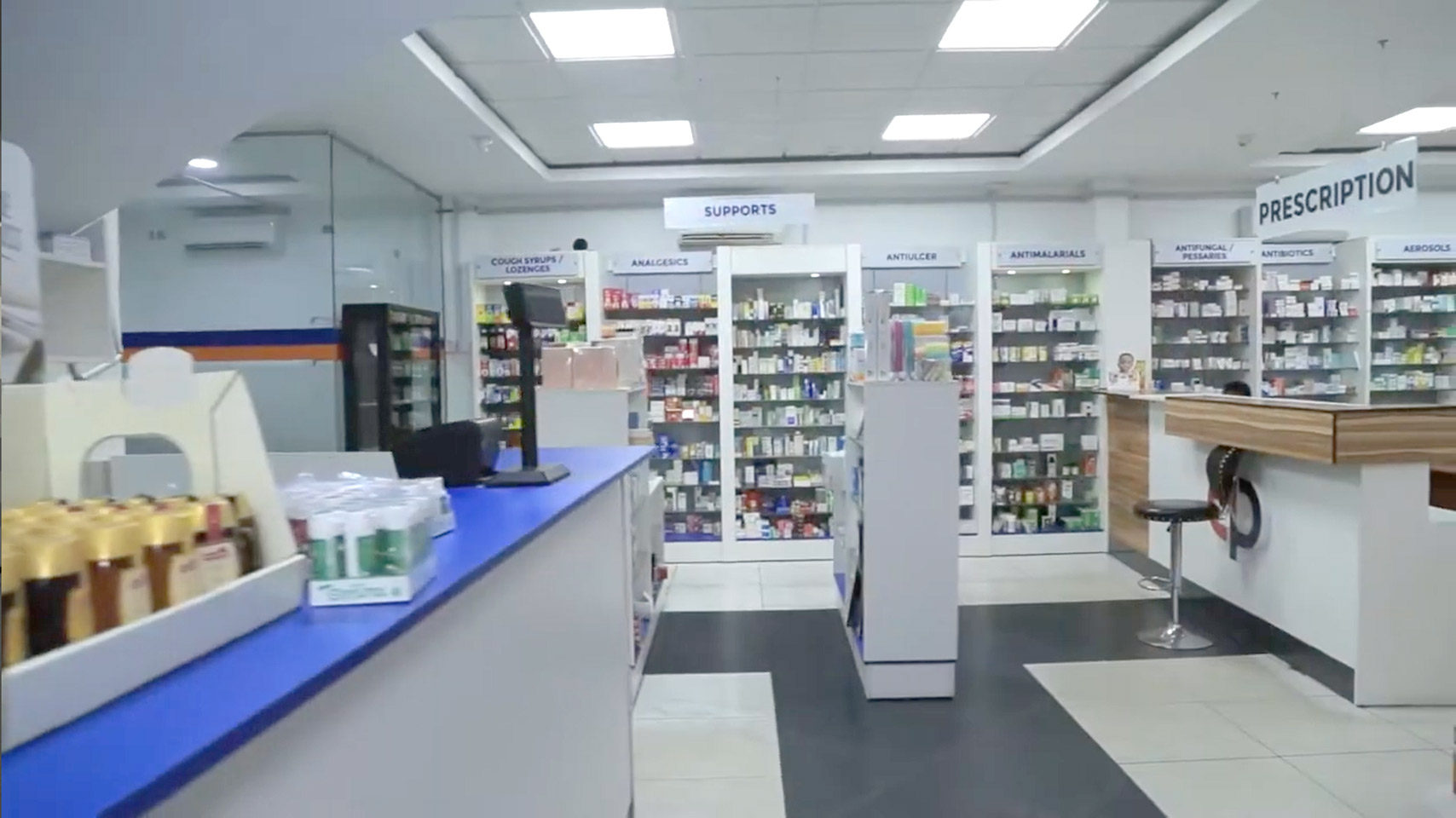
Pharmacy in Ikeja

Nigeria hosts about 60 percent of the pharmaceutical production capacity in Africa (status 2022). The larger pharmaceutical companies in Nigeria are located in the North of Lagos.

=== Automotive industry ===
Nord Automobile Limited has two assembly plants in Lagos: in Sangotedo and in Epe. The company manufactures its own plastic parts and plans to take on steel pressing in the future. The company offers eight different models. However, company founder and CEO Oluwatobi Ajayi is struggling with insufficient demand and the increase in the price of imported components due to the devaluation of the local currency, the naira, in 2023. He is looking for solutions with a German partner.

=== Lekki Free Trade Zone ===
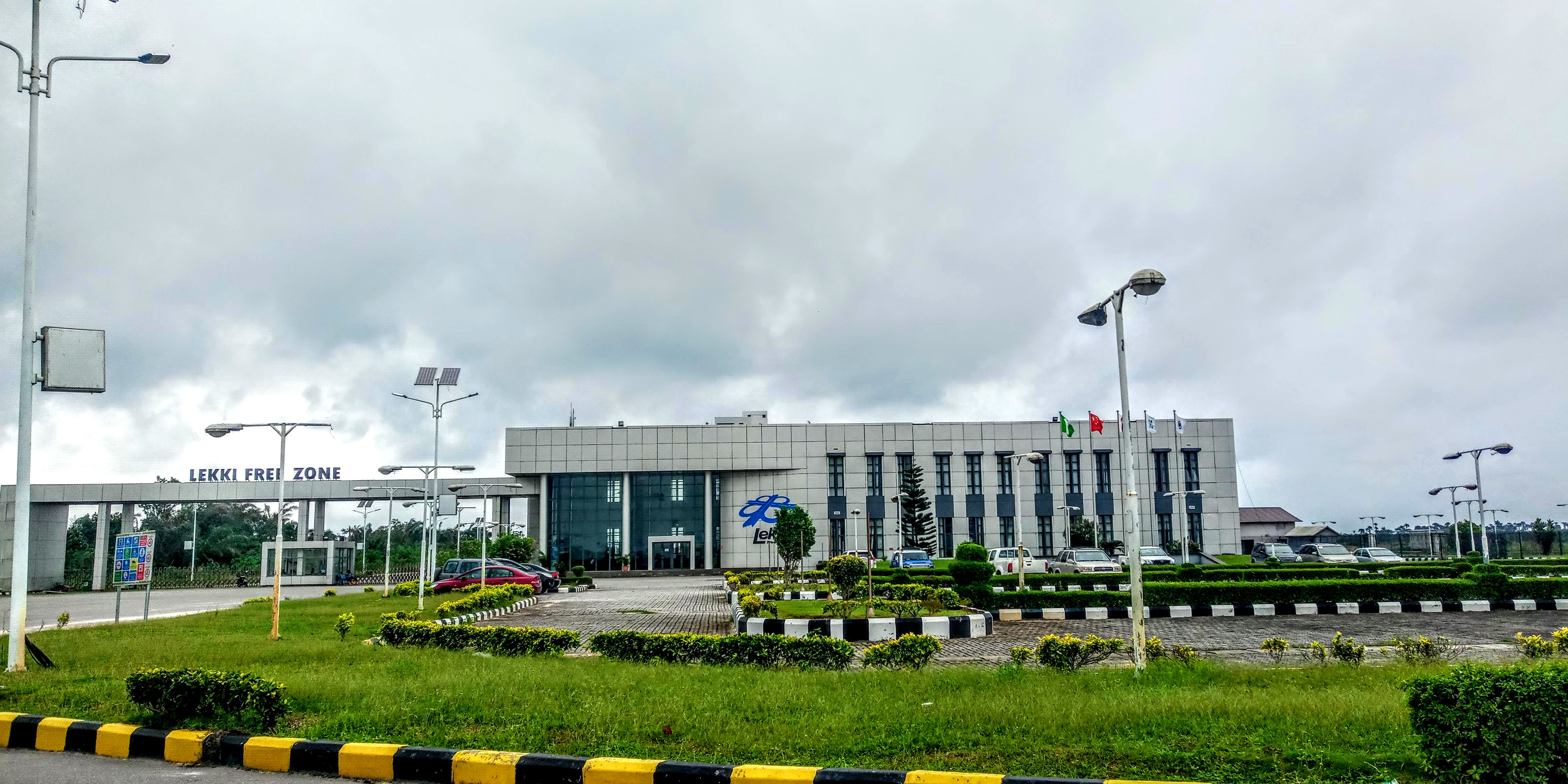
Entrance of the Lekki Free Trade Zone

The Lekki Free Trade Zone is a free trade zone in the eastern part of Lekki, covering a total area of about 155 square kilometres. It has an area of 30 square kilometres and is to be developed into a multifunctional district: integrating industry, trade and commerce, real estate development, warehousing and logistics, tourism, and entertainment.

=== Trade fairs and exhibitions ===
Lagos has two major congress halls, the Eko Convention Center and the Landmark Centre. The Eko Convention Center has 5,151 m^{2} and 13 meeting rooms. It hosts for example the Lagos Fashion Fair. The Landmark Centre has 1,004 m^{2} and 8 meeting rooms. The Landmark Centre hosts annual meetings like "Medic/Medlab West Africa", "Beauty West Africa" or "agro-food".

The Lagos Leather Fair is the largest leather fair in West Africa. Nigeria is the sixth largest leather exporter in the world, with brands such as Prada, Gucci and Louis Vuitton sourcing their goods here. Fashion journalist Waridi Schrobsdorff even puts 'Milan, Paris, Lagos' on the same level on news channel N-tv.

ART X Lagos is an international art fair held annually in Lagos that showcases modern and contemporary art from Africa and the African diaspora. It is the leading international art fair in West Africa.

Lagos Fashion Week is Africa's largest fashion event drawing considerable media attention.

=== Food processing and distribution ===
Nigeria's largest brewery, fancily named Nigerian Breweries and a Heineken subsidiary, is located in the Lagos-Surulere district. The Guinness brewery produces its famous strong beer in the Ikeja district. Apparently, the average Nigerian drinks larger quantities of this beverage than the average Irishman. Both breweries also produce non-alcoholic (Guinness also halal) malt beer, which is part of the "Lagos' way of life".

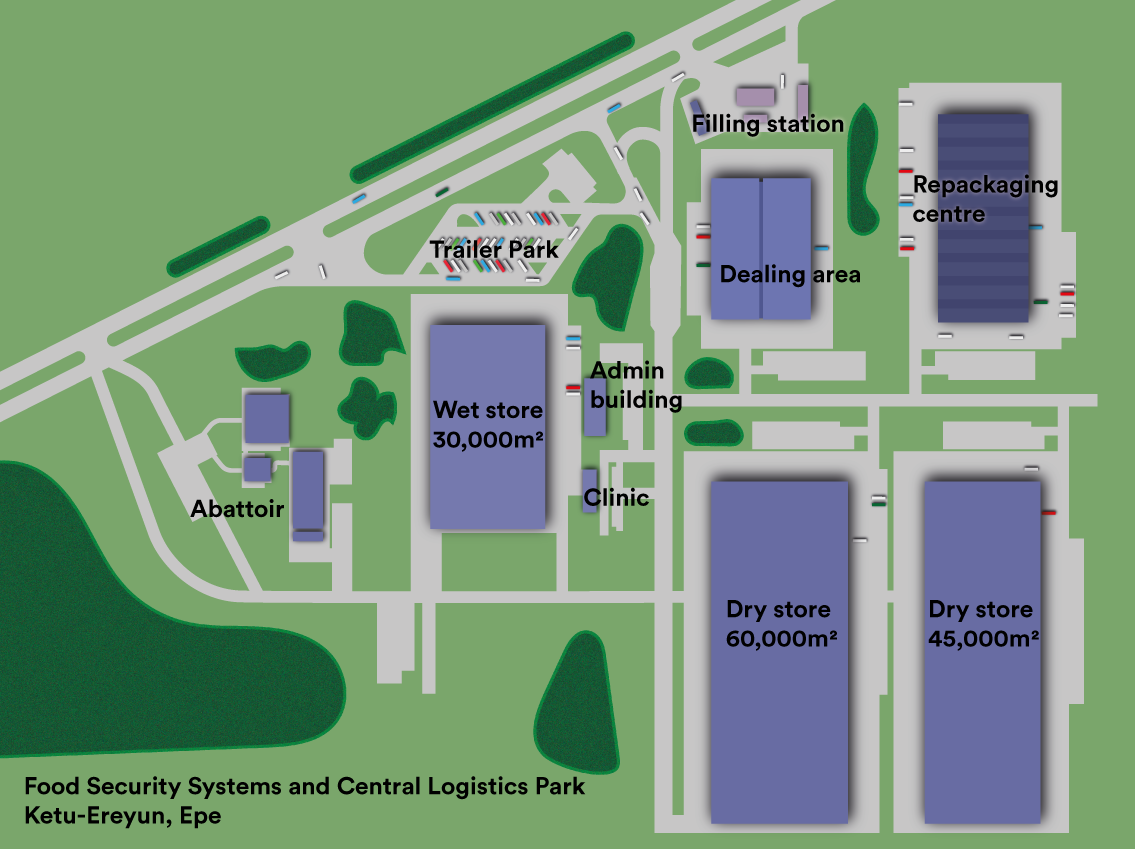
Logistics hub, close to Epe

In Ketu-Ereyun, between Epe and Ikorodu, Lagos State builds a "Food Logistics Park" – the biggest logistics hub for food in Sub-Saharan Africa. The site is 1.2 million square meters big and the construction is expected to be finished in 2024.

Until now, Nigeria paradoxically exported unhusked rice but had to import husked rice, the country's staple food. – The hulling mill in Imota, just outside Lagos, processes the rice domestically. When fully operational, the plant, the largest south of the Sahara, is expected to employ 250,000 people and produce 2.5 million 50-kg bags of rice annually.

The Apapa sugar refinery, part of the Dangote Group, increased its turnover to 288.3 billion naira (€590 million) in the third quarter of 2022 – a 47% increase from the third quarter of 2021. The sugar refinery has a capacity of 1.44 million metric tonnes per annum and supplies end users as well as bulk buyers such as Nestlé Nigeria Plc, Cadbury Nigeria Plc, Seven-Up Bottling Company Plc and the Nigerian Bottling Company.

Lagos State Governor Babajide Sanwo-Olu opened the new Ikosi International Fruits Market in the Ketu district on 25 May 2023. The new fruit market comprises 1,004 shop units. It has its own water and electricity supply, canteen and parking facilities. The facility is monitored by security personnel. On 18 December 2023, Sanwo-Olu opened a similar "Fresh Food Hub" in Idi-Oro, Mushin. Both hubs are aiming to increase the speed of food supply and reduce the percentage of food going to waste before it reaches the customer.

=== Timber, sawmill ===
The Lagos sawmill moved from its old but bursting-at-the-seams location in Oko Baba to Timberville, just outside Lagos, in 2022, where modern facilities are available.

=== Tourism ===
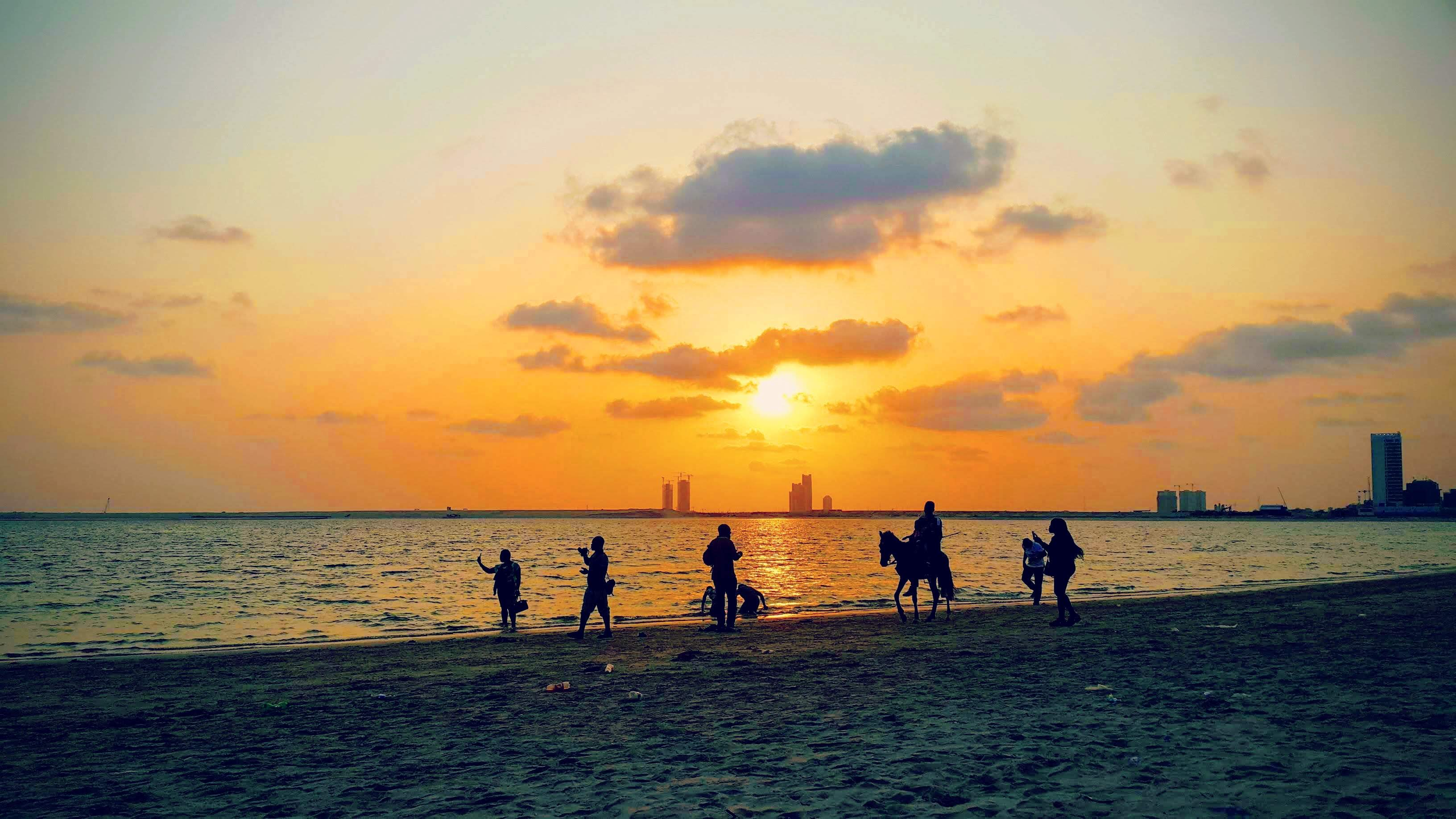
The Landmark Beach with the urban development Eko Atlantic in the background

Following the re-modernization project achieved by the previous administration of Governor Raji Babatunde Fashola, Lagos is gradually becoming a major tourist destination, being one of the largest cities in Africa and the world. Diasporan Africans and others, especially from East and Southern Africa, are increasingly visiting Lagos mostly to understand and experience the Nigeria that has been presented to them by Nollywood.

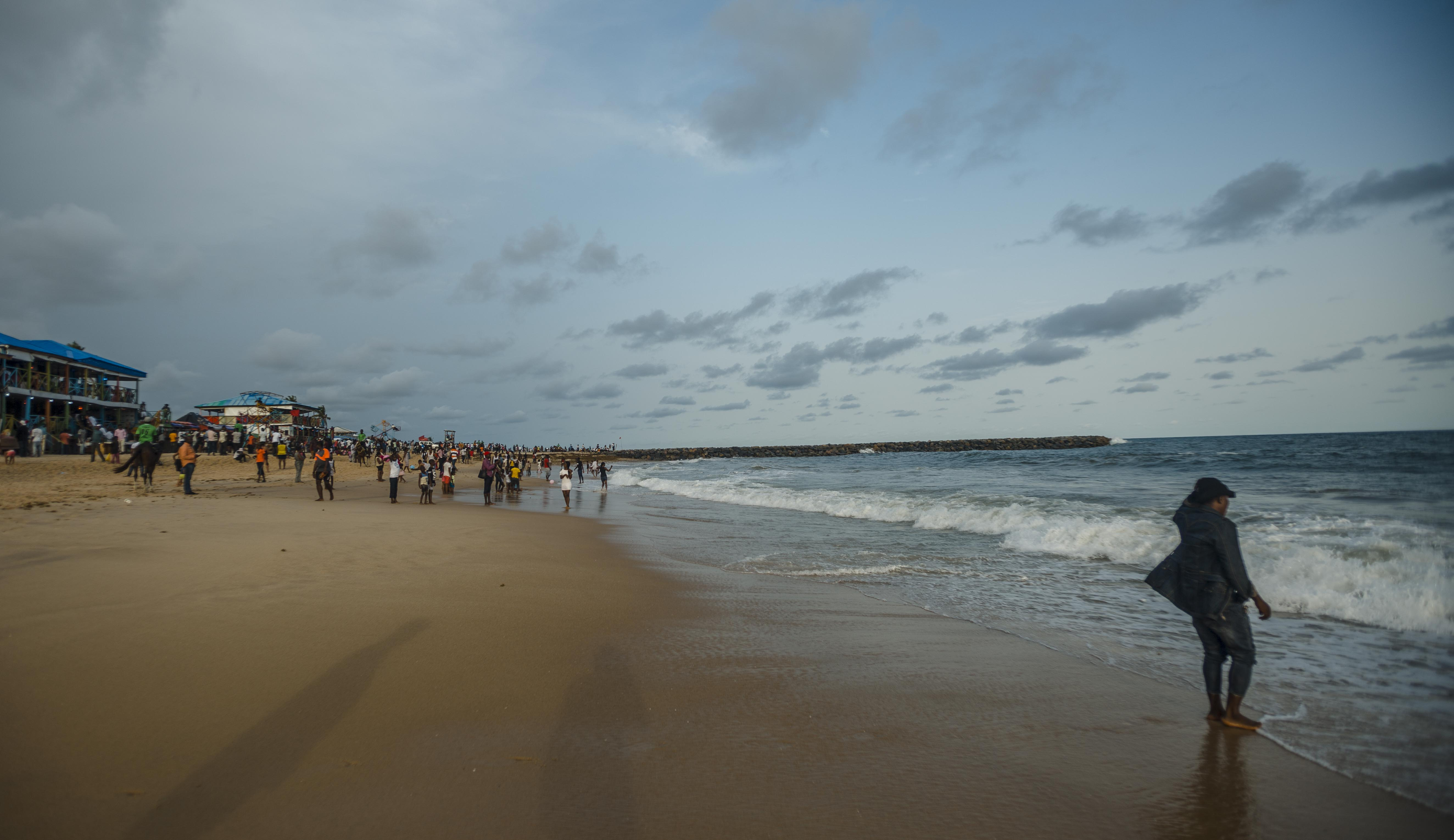
Elegushi Beach

==== Beaches, water sports ====
Lagos has sandy beaches by the Atlantic Ocean, including Tarkwa Bay, Elegushi Beach and Alpha Beach. Lagos also has a number of private beaches and resorts, including Box Beach in Elegushi Beach and the Inagbe Grand Beach Resort.

On Wole Olateju Crescent, in the immediate vicinity of Lekki Bridge, there are several companies that offer boat tours and rent kayaks or jet skis.

==== Dancing, shopping, dining ====
Lagos, especially Victoria Island and Surulere, is said to have "Africa’s craziest nightlife" and is likened to Las Vegas. Nightclubs are mainly found on Victoria Island, where the well-to-do and foreign guests hang out, and around Adeniran Ogunsanya Street in Surulere.

Rooftop restaurants on the Atlantic beach or on the lagoon offer not only culinary delights and a view but also a breeze from the sea for the visitor.

Even before the devaluation of the local currency, the naira, in June 2023, Lagos was a place where US$10 (9.10 euros) could keep you full for a day and buy souvenirs to boot. The stress-resistant and experienced bargain-hunter buys brand-name clothes for a knockdown price at the eco-market and the adjoining Martin Street.

The Lekki Arts and Crafts Market (known to Lagosians as Oba Elegushi Market) is a large market that displays a wide variety of African arts and crafts. It is considered the largest art market in Nigeria.

==== Other tourist attractions ====
- Takwa Bay – A popular bay from where you can observe shipping traffic in and out of the Lagos port as well as enjoy some water sports. If you have a personal yacht this is where to go.
- Festac Town

== Culture ==
Lagos is a cultural centre of Nigeria. As a port city and the starting point of British colonisation, the Western influence is stronger here than in probably any other Nigerian city. All Nigerian ethnic groups can be found in the melting pot of this metropolis, with the Yoruba predominating. The music and film industries in the city are dynamic centres of the country with international acclaim.

=== Architecture ===
The city of Lagos has the tallest skyline in Nigeria. The architectural styles in Lagos are diverse, ranging from tropical and vernacular to colonial European and ultramodern buildings, or a mixture. Brazilian-style architecture brought by the creoles is evident in buildings such as Water House and Shitta Bey Mosque. Skyscrapers and most high-rise buildings are centered on the islands, while the mainland has some high-rise buildings.

Lagos adopted a tropical modernist style (a climate-adapted international style), using materials like reinforced concrete, featuring clean lines, louvres, and a sun-screen facade to manage heat and environmental conditions. This style was practised widely by Onafowokan Michael Olutusen and Oluwole Olumuyiwa First generation architects in Nigeria. These included paying attention to simplicity rather than ornamentation in the building.

The spatial logic of Lagos between the early 1960s and 1980s followed a clear core periphery model. Lagos Island, the historic colonial seat, served as the administrative and commercial nucleus, while areas such as Yaba, Apapa, and Surulere developed as peripheral growth zones. This structure reflected a metabolic approach to city-building in Lagos, where the core’s functions were redistributed outward to manage congestion and promote economic decentralization. Zoning plans often emphasized the separation of functions, echoing the CIAM-influenced ideals of modernist planning.

=== Secular buildings ===
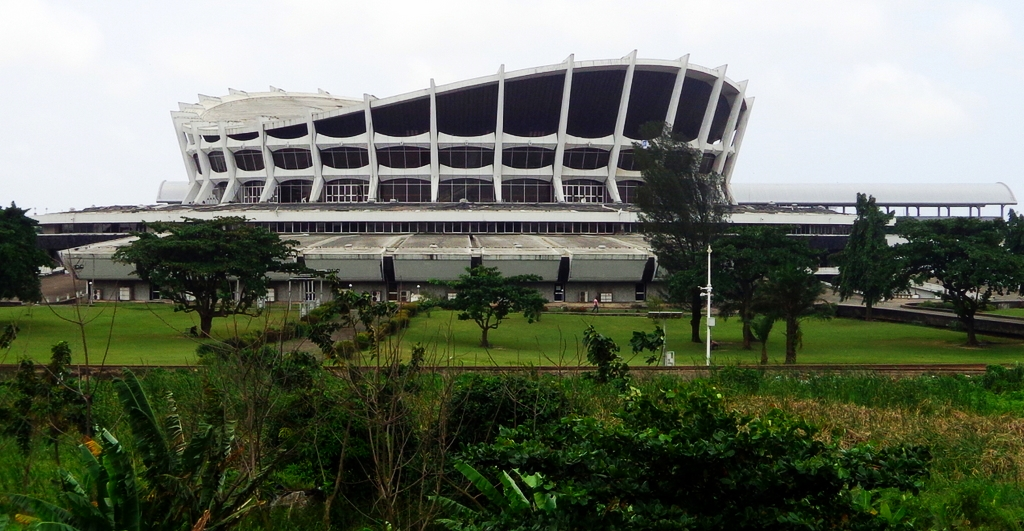
National Arts Theatre, Iganmu, Lagos

The tallest building in Lagos (and in West Africa) is the NECOM House in the Marina commercial centre, the former headquarters of the ex-telecoms monopoly NITEL. The communications mast at the top of the tower also serves as a lighthouse beacon for the Port of Lagos.

Bookshop House (2024), statue of Herbert Macaulay

A very striking building in Lagos is the National Arts Theatre (officially "Wole Soyinka Center for Culture and Creative Arts") with its oval base, its spaceship-like and military hat form echoing Japan’s Metabolist movement, where structure mirrored function and symbolic nationhood. The renovation of the National Arts Theatre was completed in March 2023. With the new "blue line" of the Lagos light rail, the National Theatre is recently easily accessible – the station "National theatre" is at a stone's throw distance from the theatre building.

Tafawa Balewa Square, near the National Museum, is a stadium with a capacity of 50,000 people, which served as a racecourse under British rule and where independence was proclaimed in 1960. At the entrance to the square stand sculptures of four white horses and seven red eagles.

The Oba's (King's) Palace at Iga Idunganran is an ancestral palace for the Oba of Lagos – the custodian on the traditions and customs of the people of Eko.

Another frequently photographed structure in Lagos is the Lekki-Ikoyi Link Bridge – or more simply: Lekki bridge.

The Bookshop House. It was built by G. Cappa in 1973 and designed by architects John Godwin and Gillian Hopwood. It was designed with special sun screening and windows having a sunbreaker facade, which reduced the heat load on air conditioners by 75% on the office floors.

=== Churches and mosques ===
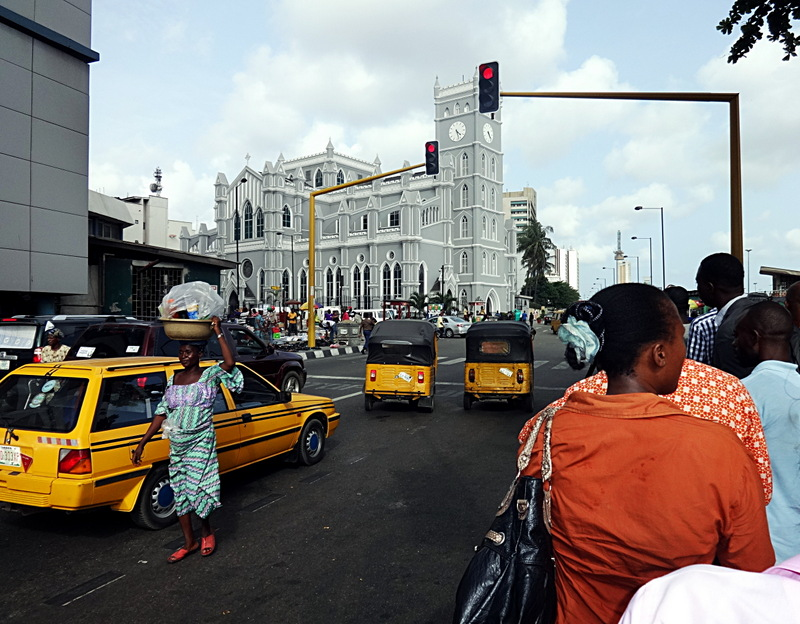
The Cathedral Church of Christ at the central Marina on Lagos Island

The Cathedral Church of Christ is the centre of the oldest part of Lagos. It is better known to Lagosians by the acronym CMS (the Church Missionary Society, CMS, is the Anglican organisation that runs this church). The Anglican church was built between 1867 and 1869, shortly after the establishment of British colonial rule. The present building, however, was constructed between 1924 and 1946. The remains of the first bishop of African descent in the Anglican Church and translator of the Bible into the Yoruba language, Samuel Ajayi Crowther, were transferred to this cathedral in 1976. A memorial stone commemorates him.

The African Church Cathedral Bethel is situated at 59 Broad Street. The African Church was founded around 1900 under the leadership of the cocoa farmer (and founder of the first agricultural co-operative in West Africa) Jacob Kehinde Coker as a breakaway from the Anglican Church, which rejected the use of local musical instruments in worship and the practice of polygamy. It was part of the growing Nigerian sense of self-identity during the early colonial period. Opposite the cathedral stands the cenotaph in memory of Taiwo Olowo (‘Taiwo the Rich’), who is considered one of the founders of Lagos as a financial centre.

The Catholic Cathedral of the Holy Cross on Campbell Street is the heart of the ‘Brazilian quarter’. Following the abolition of slavery in Brazil in 1888, many former slaves returned to Nigeria and settled in Lagos. These ‘Aguda’ people brought about a significant surge in development in the port city.

The Church of the Trinity, part of the Methodist Wesleyan movement, stands on Tinubu Square. The building replaced the original church, built in 1862, in the 1950s, as it could no longer cope with the influx of worshippers. It was constructed in an architectural style that was considered ‘modern’ in 1950.

The Synagogue Church of All Nations was built in 2004. It is part of the Nigerian Pentecostal movement, one of Nigeria’s charismatic religious movements.

Alli Balogun Mosque

The Lagos Central Mosque on Nnamdi Azikiwe Street in downtown Lagos, with a capacity for 10,000 worshippers, is one of the six largest mosques in Nigeria. It is associated with the (moderate) Jum’at movement. It was inaugurated in 1988 and replaced an older mosque dating from 1905. A few metres further on stands the Alli Balogun Mosque, renovated in 2026, which, stylistically, could easily be mistaken for a church. It was built by the shipowner Alli Balogun (a supplier to the German merchants G. L. Gaiser and Bausch&Witt), who was dissatisfied with the Central Mosque. – About 100 metres away is the oldest mosque in Lagos, the Shitta Bey Mosque on Martins Street, which was inaugurated in 1894 and has stood the test of time as a building in the Brazilian Baroque style.

=== Art ===
Lagos is a hotbed for renowned sculptors, including Ben Enwonwu, who is internationally renowned for his works in wood and bronze, and the contemporary scrap metal artist Dotun Popoola. Other prominent artists include Peju Alatise, Idowu Sonaya (known for his public busts) and experimental artists who are shaping a dynamic, modern art scene, such as Collins Abinoro Akporode and Omogie Ojei (femi.the.god), whose multidisciplinary work combines visual art with poetry to document everyday Lagos life.

==== Galleries ====
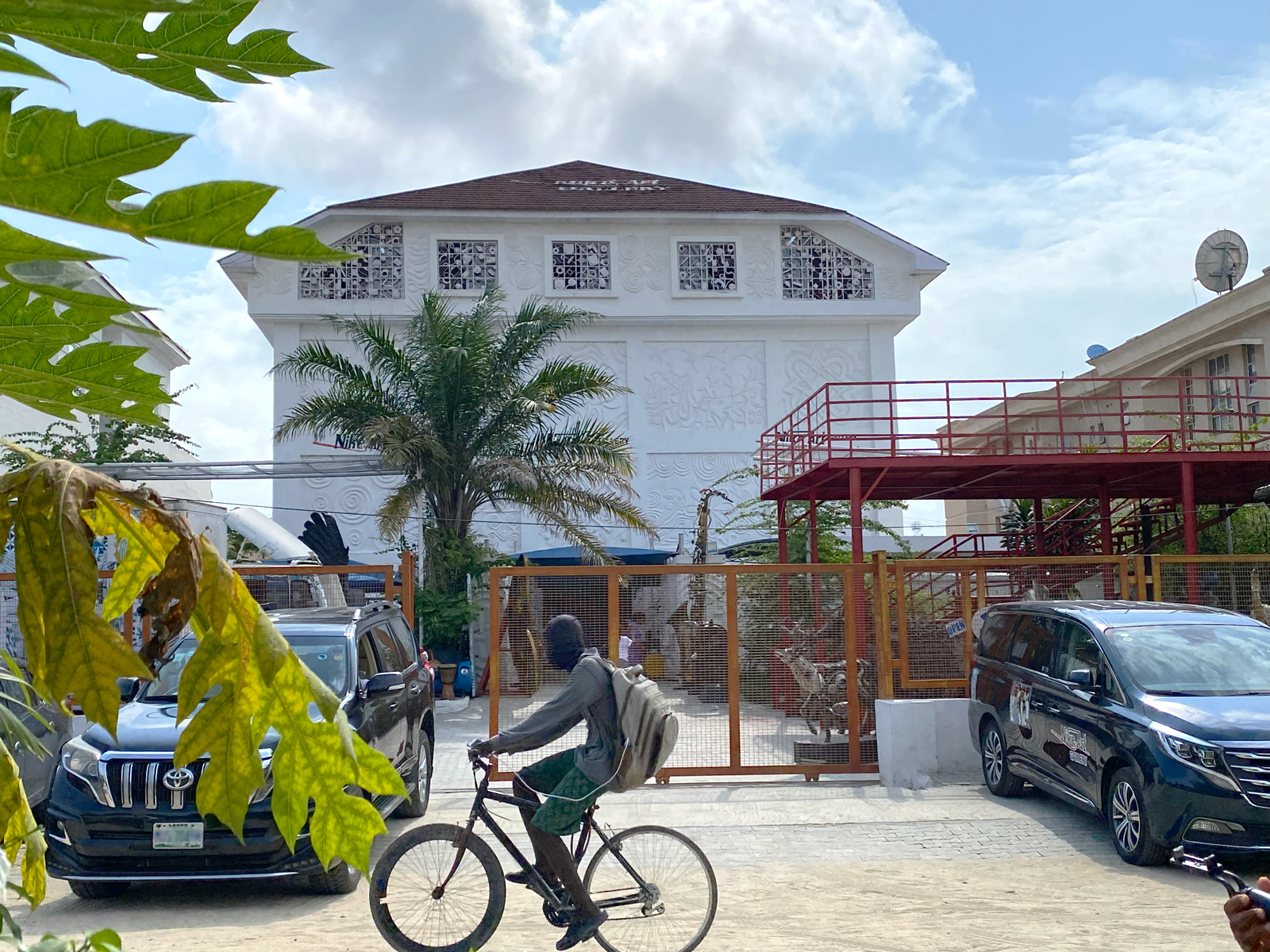
Nike Art Gallery (2026)

The Nike Art Gallery is an art gallery in Lagos owned by Nike Davies-Okundaye. The gallery is probably the largest of its kind in West Africa. It is housed in a five-storey building and has a collection of about 8,000 different works of art by various Nigerian artists such as Chief Josephine Oboh Macleod.

Red Door Gallery specializes in African contemporary art.

The Ovuomaroro Studio and Gallery is one of the oldest art galleries in Lagos.

The Alexis Galleries, owned by Patty Chidiac-Mastrogiannis, is located on Victoria Island. Since its foundation in 2011, Alexis Galleries have been engaged in the presentation and dissemination of Nigerian contemporary styles including; painting, drawing, mixed media, and sculpture. It aims to strengthen and support the Nigerian Art Circle.

In 2002, Lagos was one of the African platform cities for the art exhibition Documenta 11.

==== Public sculptures ====
Sculpture ‘MegaPipe’, in the background the NECOM House

The sculpture “MegaPipe” by Tayo Olayode and Terfa Adingi can be seen on Cable Street, near the NECOM building, Marina underground station and the LAMATA headquarters.

On 14 Marina Road, in front of the Eko Electricity Distribution Company (EKEDC) building, stands a statue of the Yoruba god Sango. It was created in 1964 by Ben Enwonwu, arguably Nigeria’s most famous sculptor.

In Yaba, near Sabo Market, Umeh Bede’s sculpture ‘Youth Empowerment’ stands on a traffic island. It depicts eleven books and three people in poses of learning or triumph.

A roundabout in the Ojodu Berger neighbourhood is not actually a park, as it is not accessible. However, there is a huge black foot there – a sculpture by Hamza Atta. Consequently, the traffic circle is known as the ‘Foot Statue Roundabout’.

In the Marwa district, on the edge of a roundabout on the Lekki-Epe expressway, visitors can admire the sculpture ‘Virtues of Life’ by Segun Aiyesan. It is a cube made of scrap metal, with each side representing a virtue such as ‘love’, ‘faith’ and so on.

=== Museums ===
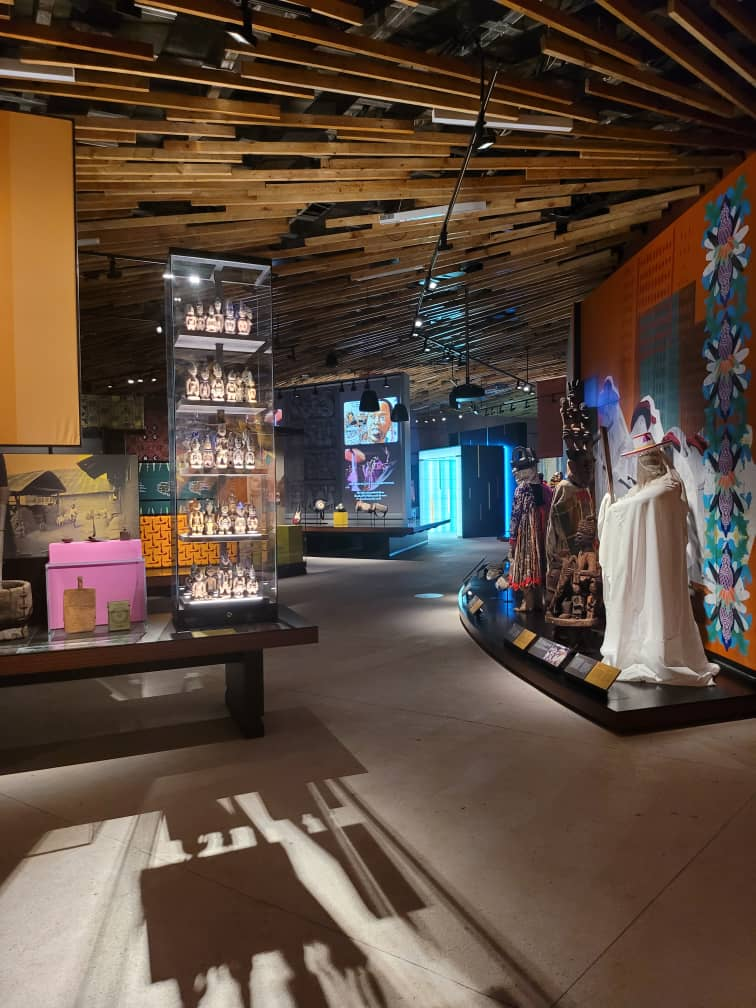
Interactive exhibition of Yoruba art at the Randle centre

The National Museum in Onikan on Lagos Island houses archaeological and ethnographic collections as well as traditional art. There is an opportunity to purchase Nigerian arts and crafts at the adjoining craft centre. Haggling is allowed at the island's Jankara market. Spices, printed cotton and hand-woven fabrics as well as leather articles are offered here.

The John K. Randle Centre houses an exhibition on Yoruba culture inaugurated in 2023. The curators actively work with artists, writers, craftspeople, historians and storytellers to share the rich Yoruba culture. The John K. Randle Centre is a new, partly interactive kind of museum. It adapts modern Western museum practices to present new forms of storytelling inspired by Yoruba traditions. It celebrates tangible and intangible culture by preserving, enhancing and promoting the cultural heritage of the Yoruba people. The centre actively collects a wide range of items that distinguish it from a traditional museum. The John K. Randle Centre plays a leading role in the repatriation of Yoruba artifacts from European institutions.

The National Gallery of Modern Art (NGMA) is situated within the National Arts Theatre and can be accessed via Entrance B. Spread over two floors, it displays colourful abstract paintings by Bruce Onobrakpeya and bronze busts by Ben Osawe. The ‘Portrait Gallery’ section features portraits of prominent figures, including all heads of state. These include works by artists such as Aina Onabolu, Hubert Ogunde, Chinua Achebe, Wole Soyinka and Ben Enwonwu. Other paintings are by Akinola Lasekan, Erhabor Emokpae, Solomon Wangboje, Haig David West and Gani Odutokun. There is also a section dedicated to modern sculptures.

The Kalakuta Republic is a museum honouring late musician Fela Kuti.

Furthermore, the Mindscape Children Museum deserves mentioning. Since 2015 it has been notable as Nigeria's premiere Children's museum. It aims at social interaction and improves their natural curiosity.

=== Performance ===
Conservatoire MUSON Centre

The Muson Centre (Musical Society of Nigeria) is a theatre/performance hall. MUSON regularly organizes concerts of both Nigerian and Western genres. Its choir has performed since 1995, and the symphony orchestra, Nigeria's only professional symphony orchestra at the time, since 2005. Both perform regularly at the annual MUSON Festival and during the Society's concert season.

=== Festivals ===
In Lagos, festivals take place in different months. These are the Lagos Carnival in January, the Eko International Film Festival in March, the Lagos Black Heritage Carnival in April, the Lagos Photo Festival in November, the Book & Art Festival in November and the Lagos Food Festival in December. The Lagos Jazz Festival features music of all genres with a focus on jazz. The Experience is a decibel-rich gospel concert hosted by the evangelical House of the Rock Church in packed Talewa Balewa Square on the first Friday in December. Ear protection and a certain tolerance for overly dedicated worshippers are recommended.

The Eyo Carnival is an irregular festival that originated in Iperu Remo, Ogun State.

=== Cuisine ===
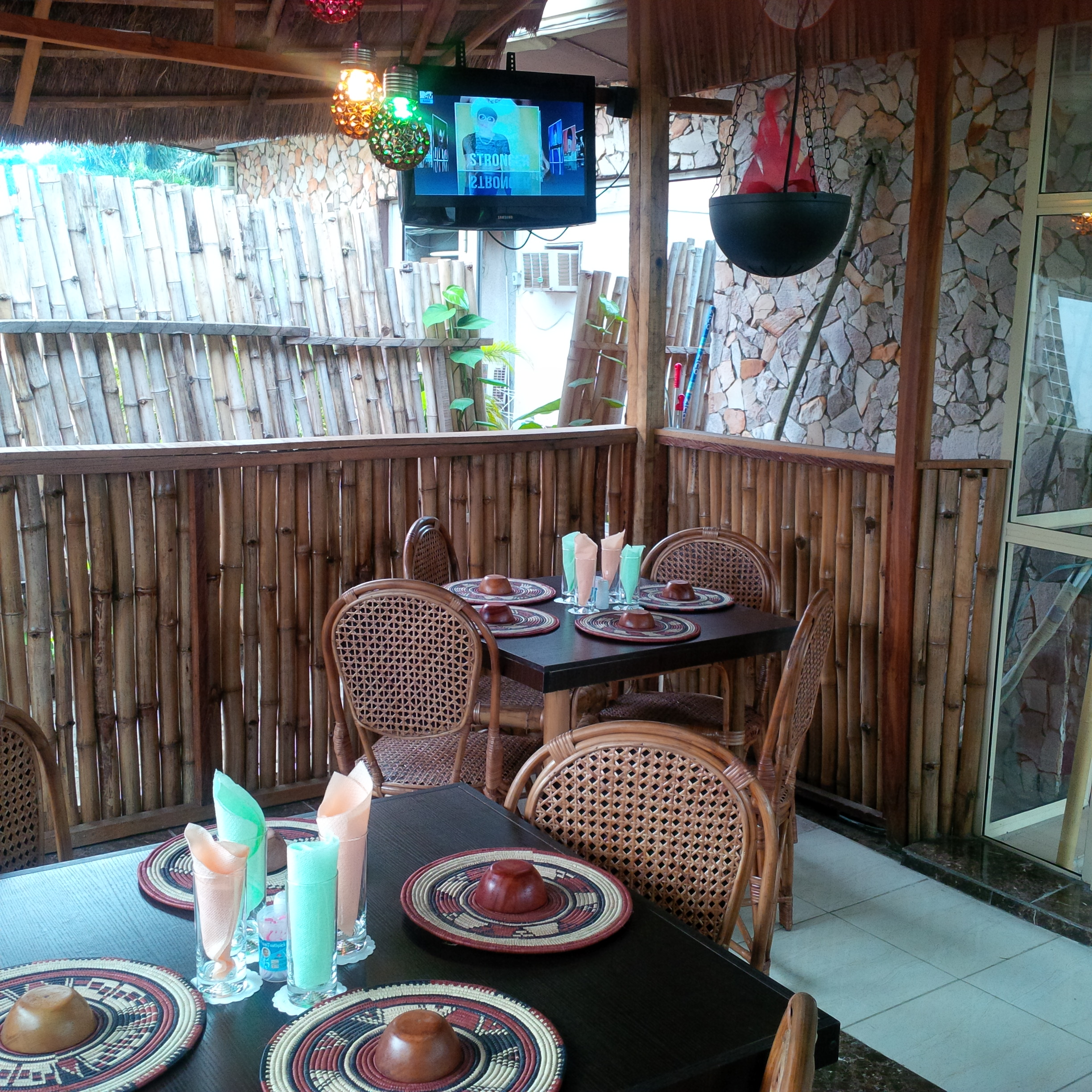
Arewa Traditional Kitchen

Some of the famous dishes in Lagos include Indigenous delicacies such as eba and egusi; amala and ewedu; jollof (the go-to party dish); ofada rice; plantains (locally called dodo); beans; suya (spicy shish kebab or spiced roasted beef), which is consumed in local clubs and bars with a bottle of cold beer; and eba, made from cassava and eaten with soups prepared with vegetables and mixture of spices and herbs. Other dishes range from local ones like Iyan (pounded yam) made from yam flour, amala; asaro, which is usually eaten with various kinds of vegetables; and Egusi (melon soup) to European, Middle-Eastern, and Asian cuisine.

=== Music ===
Lagos is famous throughout Africa for its music scene. Lagos has a vibrant nightlife and has given birth to a variety of styles such as Sakara music, Nigerian hip hop, highlife, juju, fuji and Afrobeats.

James Brown performed in Lagos in 1970. With his band Wings, Paul McCartney recorded his fifth post-Beatles album, Band on the Run, in an EMI studio in Lagos in August and September 1973. Other foreign musicians who have also performed in the city include Sean Paul, Snoop Dogg, 50 Cent, Akon, Jarule, Ashanti, Usher, Shaggy, R Kelly, Cardi B, Migos especially during the Star Mega Jam; Shakira, John Legend, Ludacris, Busta Rhymes, Boyz II Men, T-Pain, Brian McKnight, JayZ, Mary J. Blige, Beyoncé, Brandy, Ciara, Keri Hilson and Lauryn Hill.

=== Film ===
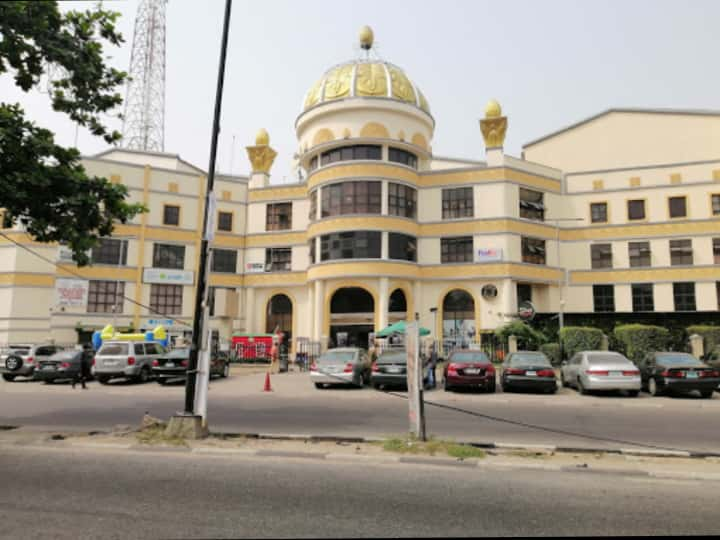
Silverbird Galleria cinema in Lagos

The Surulere district is the centre of the Nigerian film industry, commonly referred to as Nollywood. Lagos itself is the location and setting for many films. The city is featured in domestic and foreign feature film productions. Many films are shot in the Festac area of Lagos, which also hosted the World Festival of Black Arts. The 2016 film Captain America: Civil War contains a scene set in Lagos. The Spanish police series La unidad (2020–2023), the British drama The last tree (2019) and the US-Spanish drama The Way, Chapter 2 with Martin Sheen (2023 still in development) also use Lagos as a filming location. The film 93 Days with Danny Glover is a somewhat melodramatic but fact-based account of the Ebola outbreak in Lagos in 2014 and was filmed at original locations.

Since the success of the Nigerian thriller The Figurine, Nigerian film has increasingly focused on high-quality productions that are also commercially successful. This, in turn, has led to ever-new records in box office takings in Nigeria (2009: "The Figurine", 2013: "Half of a Yellow Sun", 2016: "The Wedding Party").

== Sports ==
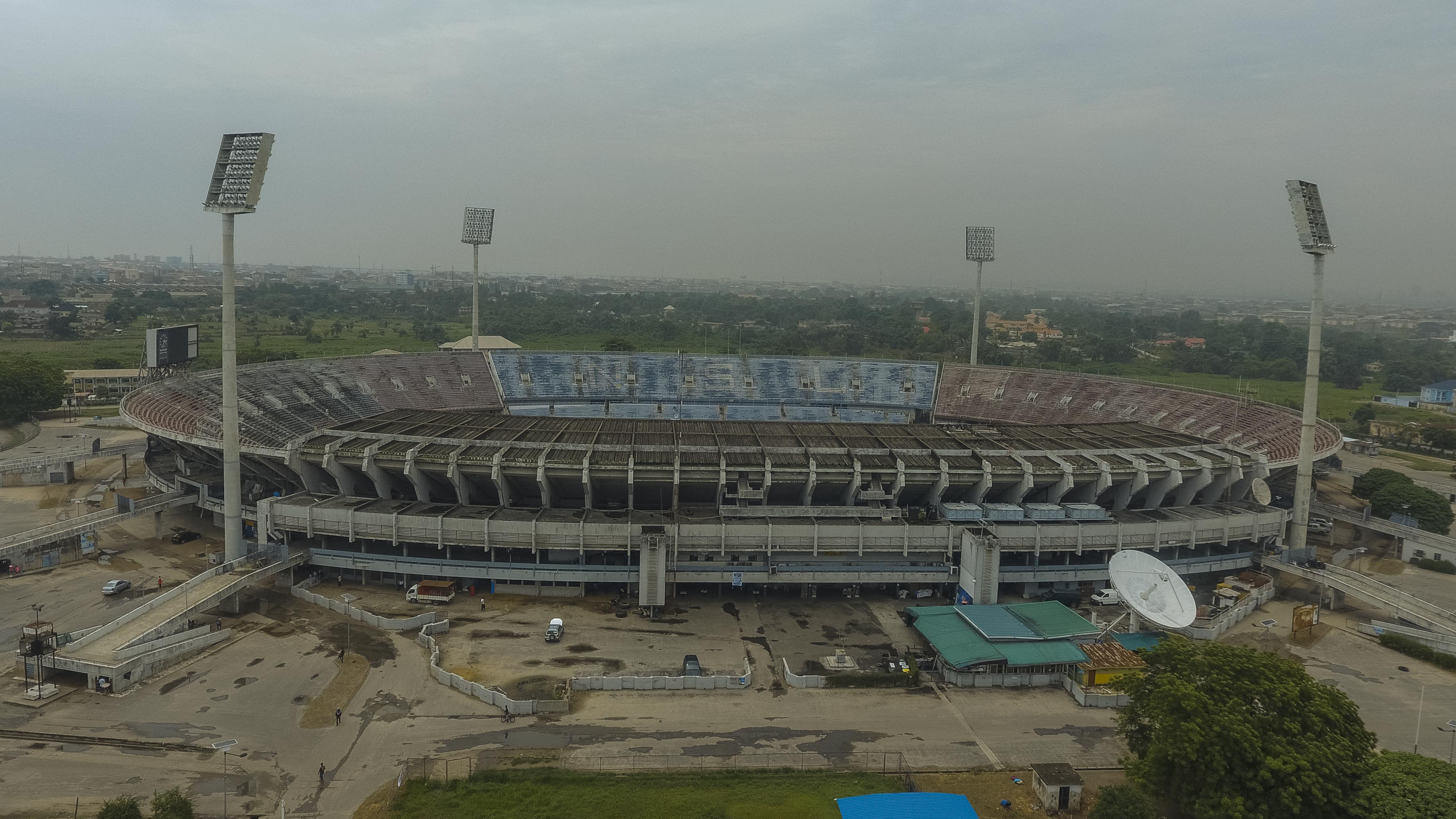
National Stadium

Association football is Lagos's most popular sport. Prominent Lagos football clubs include Bridge Boys F.C., MFM F.C., and First Bank: both play in Nigeria National League, the second tier of Nigerian football.

The Nigeria national football team, also known as the Super Eagles, used to play almost all of their home games in Lagos at the National Stadium in Surulere; much later, games were played at the then New Abuja National Stadium in Abuja for some time; however, games are now mostly played at the newer Godswill Akpabio International Stadium in Uyo, which is the default home of the Super Eagles. Lagos also hosted the 2nd All-African Games in 1973.

In October 2025 the UIM E1 Lagos GP took place on the Lagos lagoon. It was the first-ever E1 electric powerboat championship race in Africa. Team Brazil won the race.

== Education ==
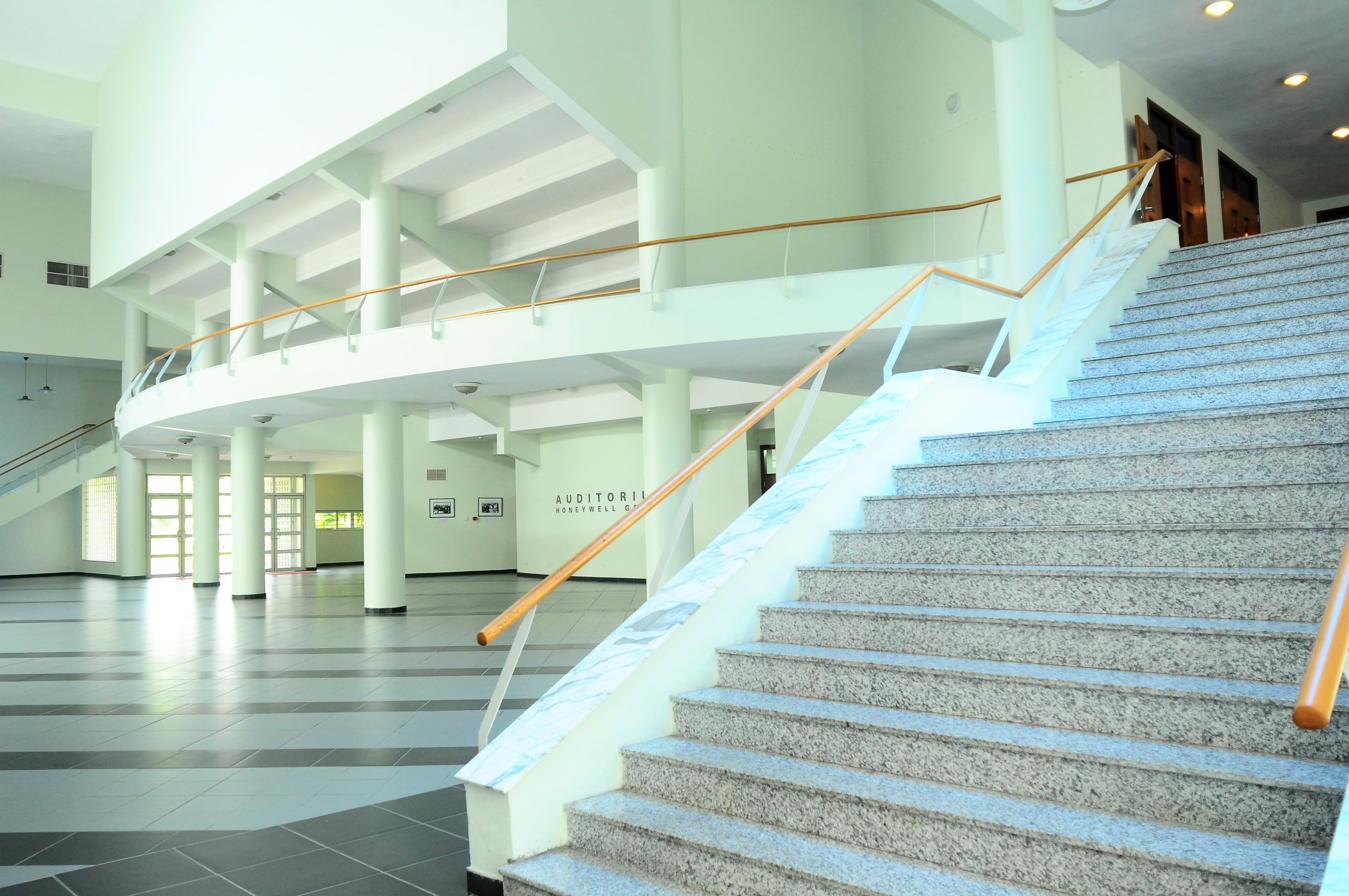
Lagos Business School

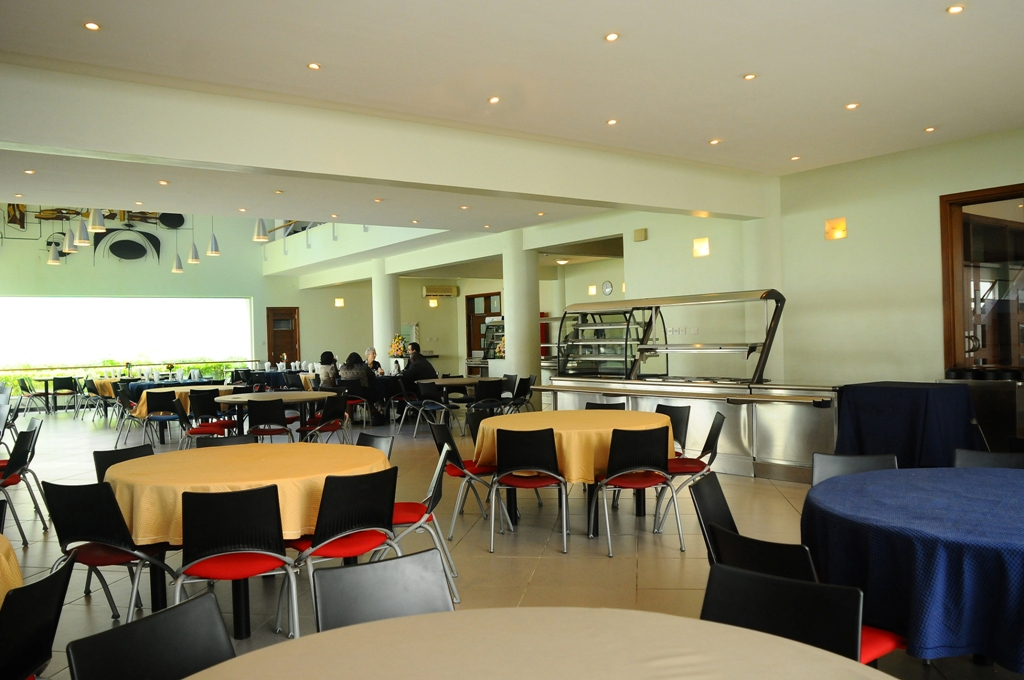
Lagos Business School's Cafeteria

The Lagos State Government operates state schools. The education system is the 6-3-3-4 system, which is practiced throughout the country (as well as by many other members of the Economic Community of West African States). The levels are Primary, Junior Secondary School (JSS), Senior Secondary School (SSS), and university. All children are offered basic education, with a special focus now on the first nine years. Many of the schools in Nigeria are federally funded and usually are boarding schools. A few examples are the Federal government college Odogbolu (FGCOdogbolu), the Federal government girls' college Sagamu (FGGCSagamu), and the Federal government college Kano (FGCKano). The state of Lagos has its own federally funded high schools namely Federal government college Ijanikin also known as FGC Lagos, King's College Lagos, and Queen's College Lagos.

Lagos is home to postsecondary schools, universities, and other vocational institutions that are either operated by the government or private entities.

=== Vocational schools ===
- Institute for Industrial Technology (IIT): founded in 2000, IIT is a technical vocational school for male youth from families with limited resources. Its educational model is based on the Dual Training System.

=== Polytechnics ===
- Yaba College of Technology (YABATECH): founded in 1934, the college is Nigeria's first higher educational institution and the third in Africa. The college is a centre of culture and heritage. It has student enrolments of over 16,000.
- Lagos City Polytechnic, located at 6/8, Bashiru Oweh Street, Off Simbiat Abiola Road (formerly Medical Road), Ikeja – This is the first private Polytechnic in Nigeria. It was established in 1990 by Engr. Babatunde Odufuwa. Engr. Odufuwa hails from Oke-Aye in Ijebu North East Local Government Area (I.N.E.L.G) of Ogun State.
- Grace Polytechnic
- Wolex Polytechnic
- Federal College of Fisheries and Marine Technology is a mono-technic that offers courses in fisheries technology, general science, marine engineering and nautical science.
- Federal College of Education (tech) Akoka
- Ronik Polytechnic

=== Universities ===
- The University of Lagos (UNILAG) Akoka, is a large institution dating from 1962, with over 55,000 students. It comprises 13 faculties, run by over 4,000 staff.
- Lagos State University (LASU) is a multi-campus university established in the year 1983 and owned by the Lagos State government. The main campus is located at Ojo, along the Lagos-Badagry Expressway.
- Lagos State University of Science and Technology (LASUSTECH) located in Ikorodu was converted from Lagos State Polytechnic (LASPOTECH) to a state university of science and technology by Governor Babajide Olusola Sanwoolu leaving Lagos State without a state owned polytechnic.
- Pan-Atlantic University formerly known as Pan-African University has a business school (LBS), a school of Media and Communication (SMC), and an entrepreneurial development centre (EDC), specialising in providing short courses for SMEs. The School of Media and Communication is also known for its pragmatic communication courses in the fields of journalism, media, and marketing. SMC awards BSc., MSc., and Ph.D. in social science courses. Founded in 1996 and awarded university status in 2002. The university also places some emphasis on the study of art, running the Virtual Museum of Modern Nigerian Art.
- National Open University of Nigeria is the first Open university in Nigeria; it is located on Ahmadu Bello Way, Victoria Island, Lagos.
- Caleb University is a private university located at Imota, Lagos.
- Lagos State College of Health Technology (LASCOHET) is an institution that runs health courses such as Health Information Management, Pharmacist Tech, Medical Laboratory Tech, Community Health Extension, and Environmental Health Technology; it is located in Yaba.
- Lagos State University College of Medicine (LASUCOM), Ikeja
- College of Medicine, University of Lagos (CMUL)
  UNILAG, Senate building
  UNILAG, Centre for Geosciences
  UNILAG, Afe Babalola auditorium
  LASU, Babajide Sanwo-Olu library
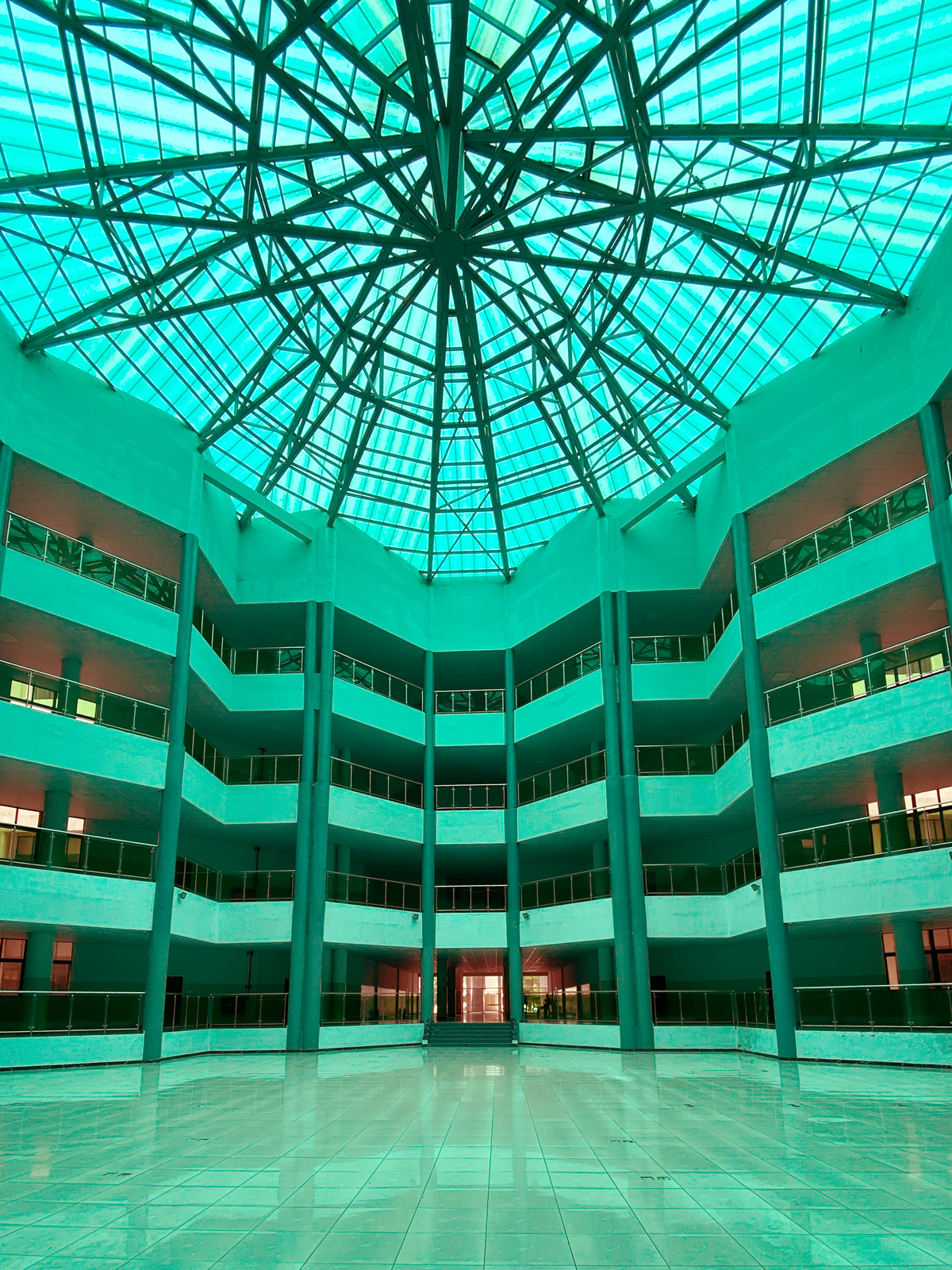
  LASU, Babajide Sanwo-Olu library

== Crime ==
Accurate statistics on crime are not available for Lagos. Residents may not report crimes to the police due to lack of access, distrust, fear of retaliation, or the belief that the police will simply be unable to help. The police, in turn, suffer from chronic underfunding, poor equipment, inadequate training, and corruption, limiting their ability to investigate crimes.

The Council on Foreign Relations' Nigeria Security Tracker tracked homicides (murder, manslaughter, etc.) by criminals, religious zealots (such as Boko Haram) and police attacks in Nigeria for each state from 2012 to 2023.

Strikingly, according to the NST, Nigeria's two largest cities, Lagos and Kano, are significantly safer than rural areas when it comes to homicides. For Lagos State, the NST shows 135 such violent deaths in the past 24 months (as of July 2023), or 5.6 annually for every million inhabitants (for comparison, the United Kingdom's crime statistics in 2022 counted 10 homicides per million inhabitants or Turkey's 24). For Nigeria as a whole, this figure is 93, with 62% of these cases attributable to police violence (mainly vigilante justice). Boko Haram plays a negligible role (as of 2023) in Lagos.

== Parks and recreation ==
=== Parks and gardens ===
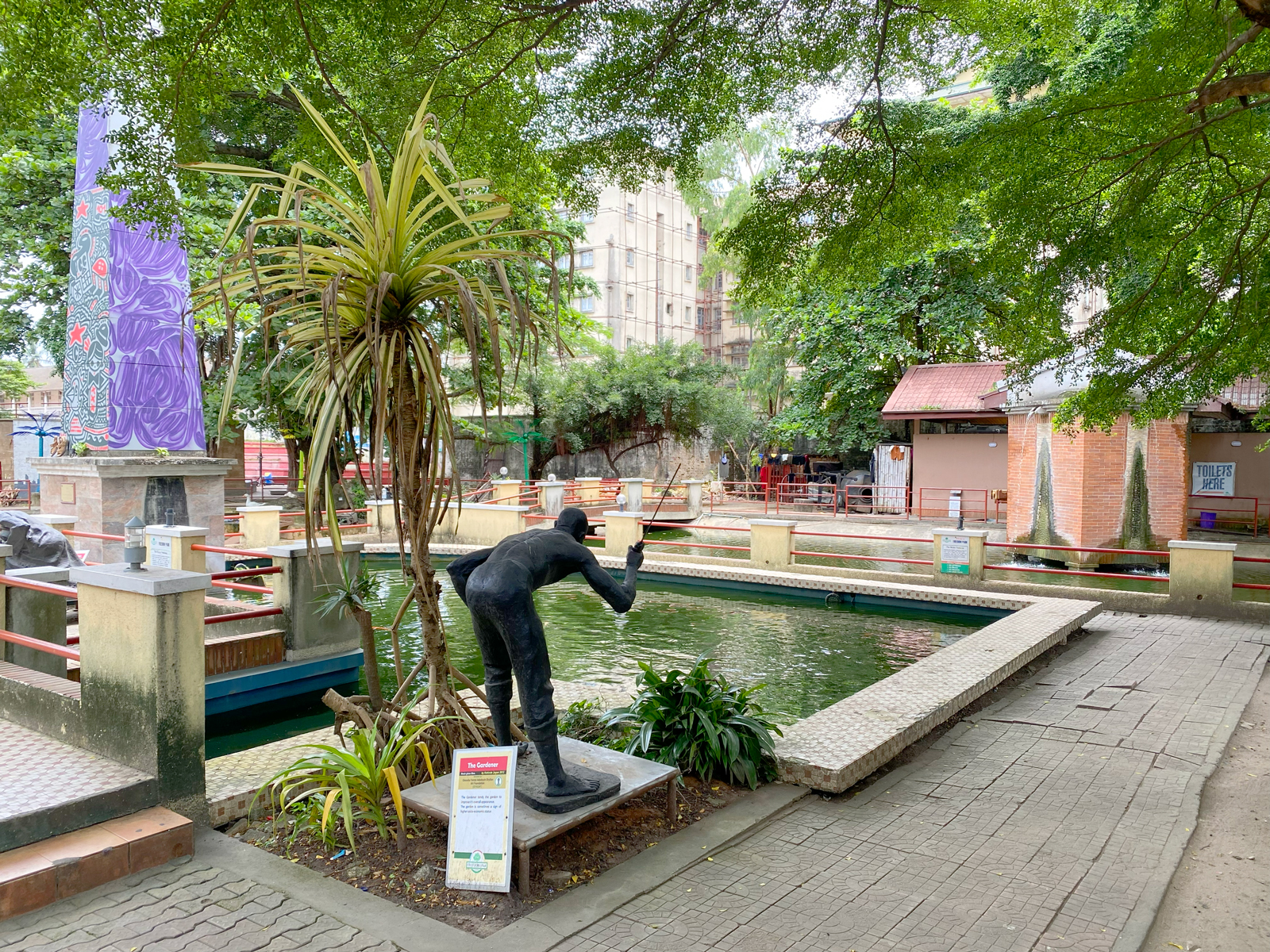
Freedom Park (2026)

Freedom Park is a memorial and recreational park in the middle of Lagos city centre on Lagos Island, Nigeria, which used to be Her Majesty's Broad Street Prison. It was designed by architect Theo Lawson. The park was built to preserve the history and cultural heritage of Nigerians. The monuments in the park commemorate the colonial heritage of Lagos and the history of Her Majesty's Broad Street Prison. It was erected to mark the 50th Independence Anniversary celebrations in October 2010. The park is a national memorial, a historical landmark, a cultural site and an arts and recreation centre. Now a tranquil place for individuals, visitors and collective contemplation, the park is open to the public daily. Today, Freedom Park has become a gathering place for various social events and recreational entertainment.

Muri Okunola Park on Victoria Island is adorned with three works of art: sculpture MA´MI by Abolore Sobayo (2017), Undressed Identity by Dudu Emmanuel (2018) and "The King's Court" by artist collective Inscribe (2026). It is often used by photographers and content creators as a backdrop.

Ndubuisi Kanu Park and Johnson Jakande Tinubu (JJT) Park are public green spaces in the district of Ikeja, situated in the immediate vicinity of the Lagos State House of Assembly, the official residence of the State Governor and other government buildings (Ikeja is the administrative centre of Lagos State). They are separated from one another by Mobolaji Johnson Avenue. – Johnson Jakande Tinubu Park is characterised by a sculpture in which the heads of the three (former) governors after whom the park is named merge into one another.

The Jhalobia Recreation Park and Gardens is a botanical garden run by Veronica Adepoju and her two daughters – three qualified landscape designers who showcase the full range of their artistry on just under a hectare of land. Situated in the immediate vicinity of the airport, the site is very photogenic and is therefore regularly booked for weddings and other celebrations, but it is also ideal for tourists who have arrived too early for their return flight.

MKO Abiola Park and the adjacent Peace Park are public green spaces in the Ketu district with sculptures. The former is named after Moshood Abiola, the presumed winner of the 1993 elections, who died as a political prisoner under the dictator Abacha; there is a statue of him in the park.

=== Nature parks ===
The Lekki Conservation Centre is located in Lekki Peninsula II. It consists of a fenced-off strip of vegetation that attempts to replicate rainforest, mangroves and savannah. There are monkeys, numerous birds, snakes and crocodiles. There is a small museum with stuffed animals. On Sundays however, it is used for lengthy religious service. According to a tourism website, the LCC is the second-most popular site in Lagos to see (after the Nike Gallery, see chapter "Art").

LUFASI Nature Park is the Lekki Urban Forestry and Animal Shelter Initiative in Sangotedo. It preserves nature and protects wildlife and endangered species. Nollywood film crews often use this park as a set.

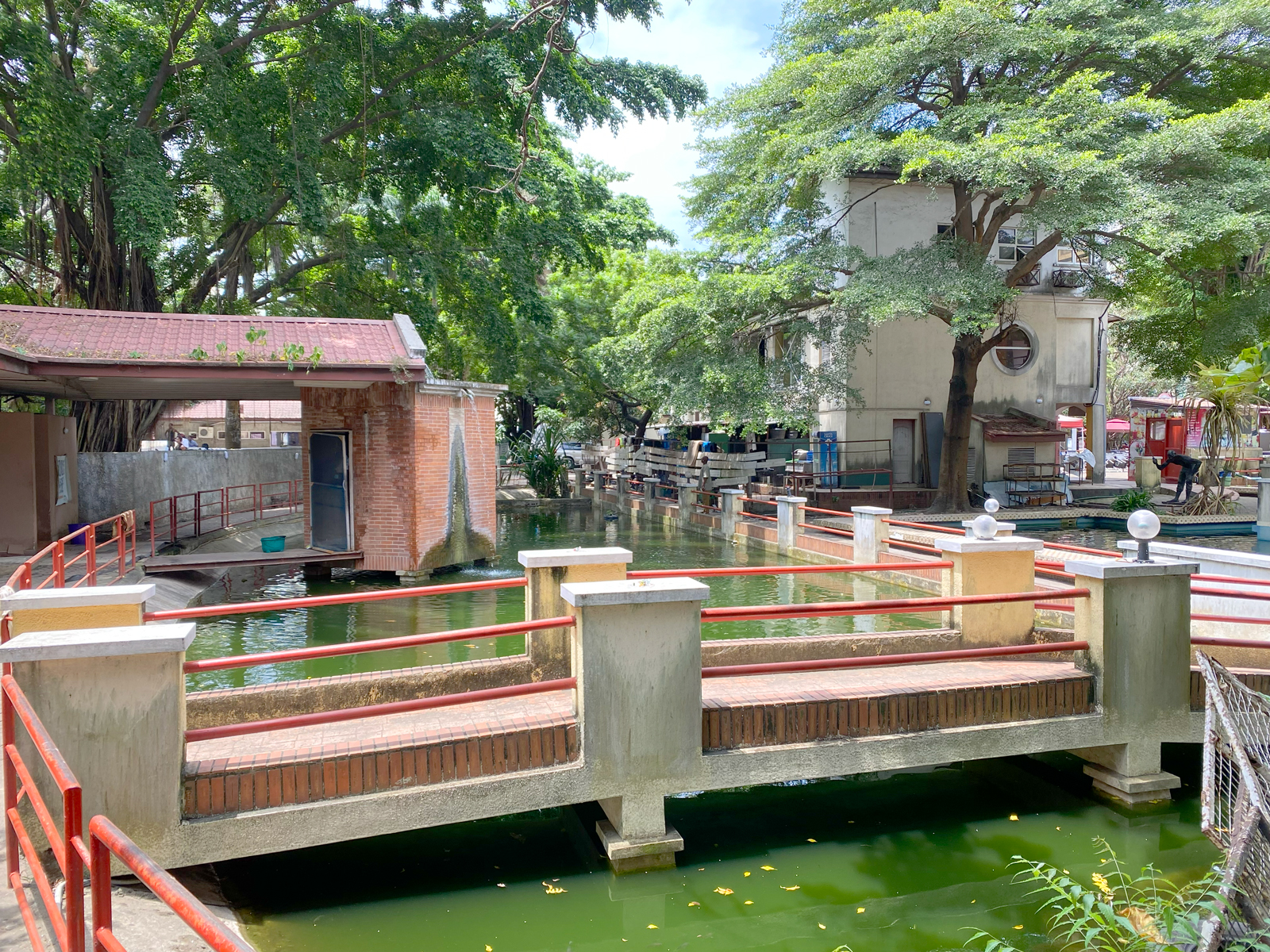
Freedom Park

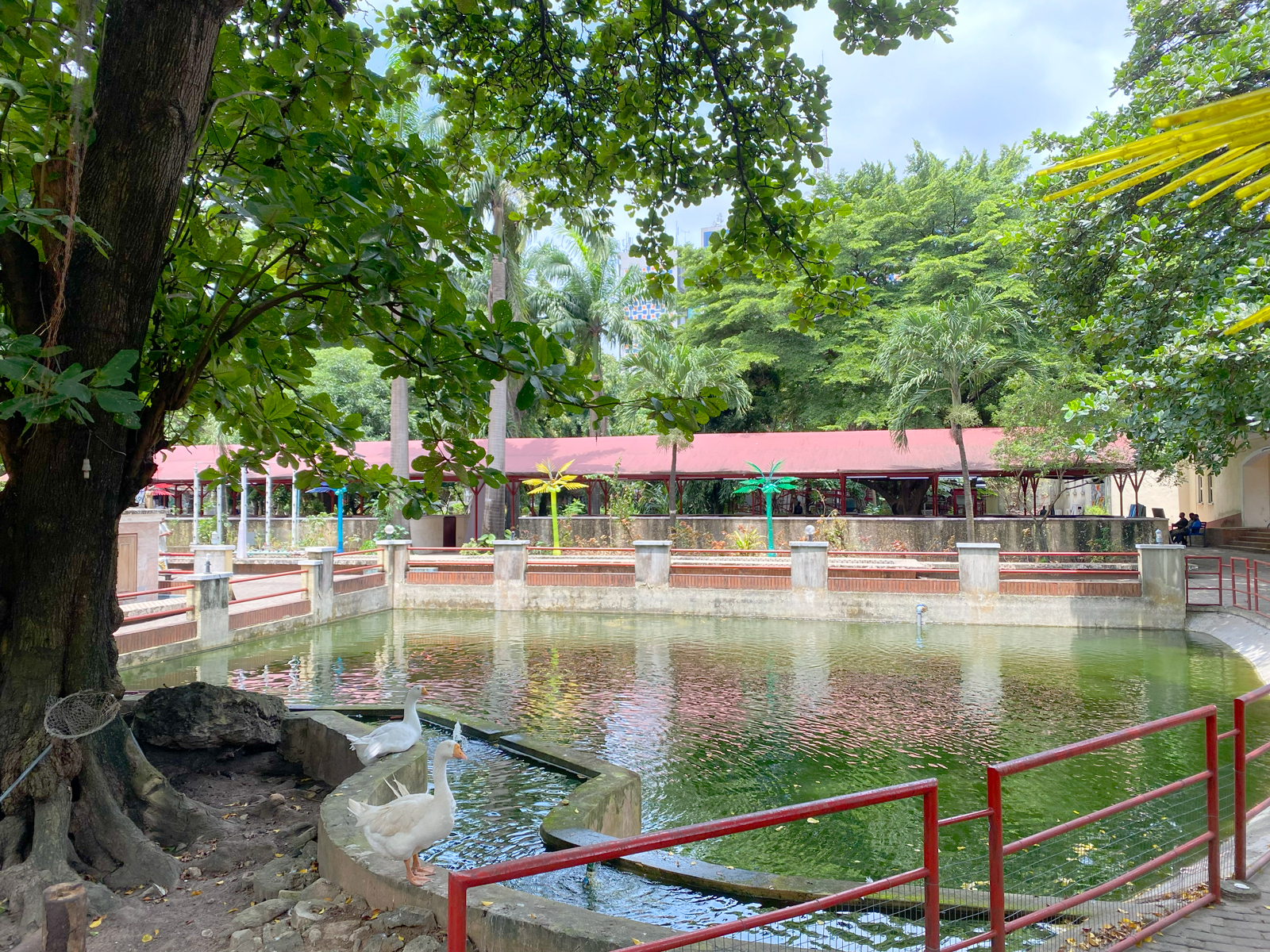
Freedom Park

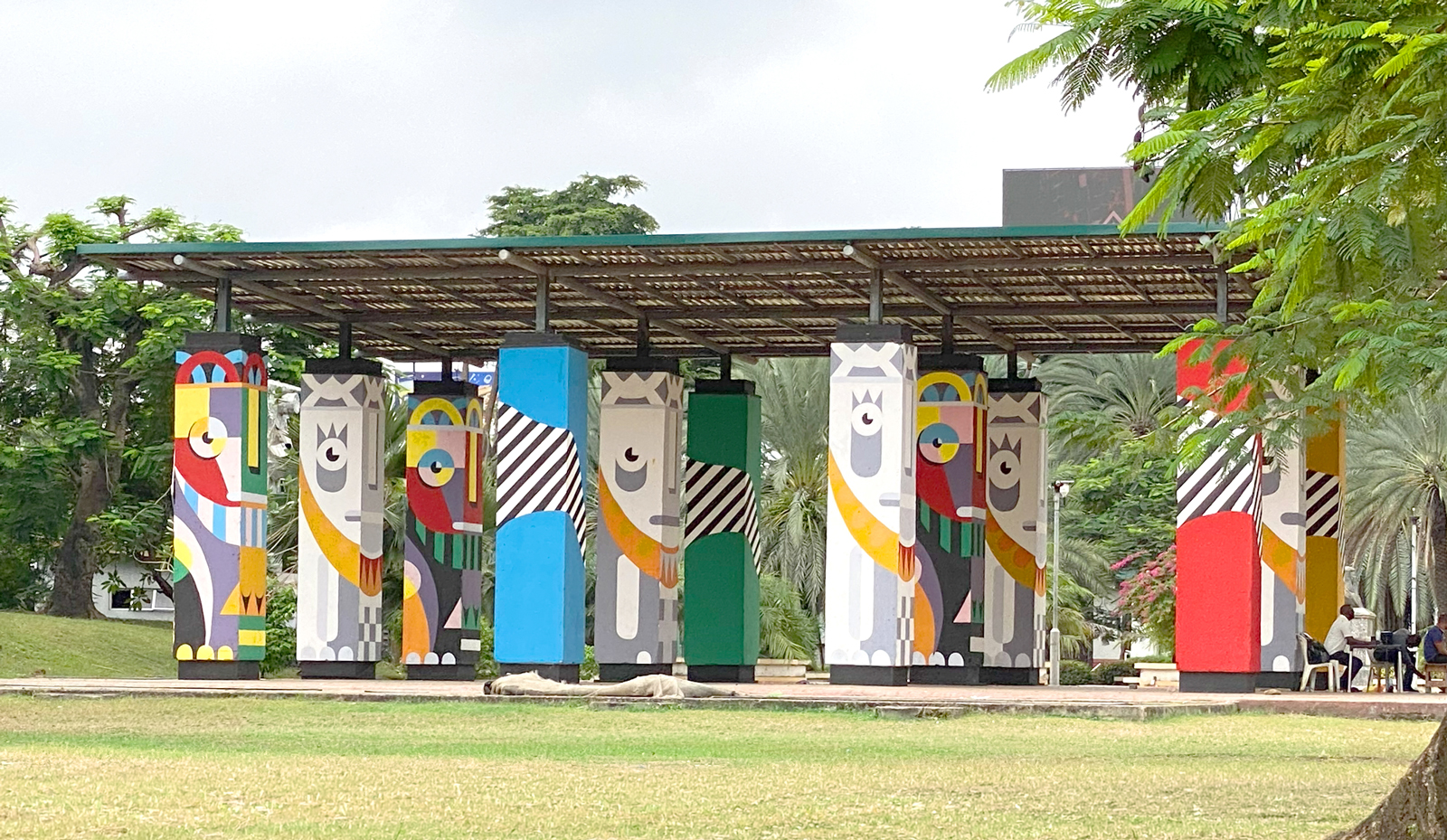
Muri Okunola Park

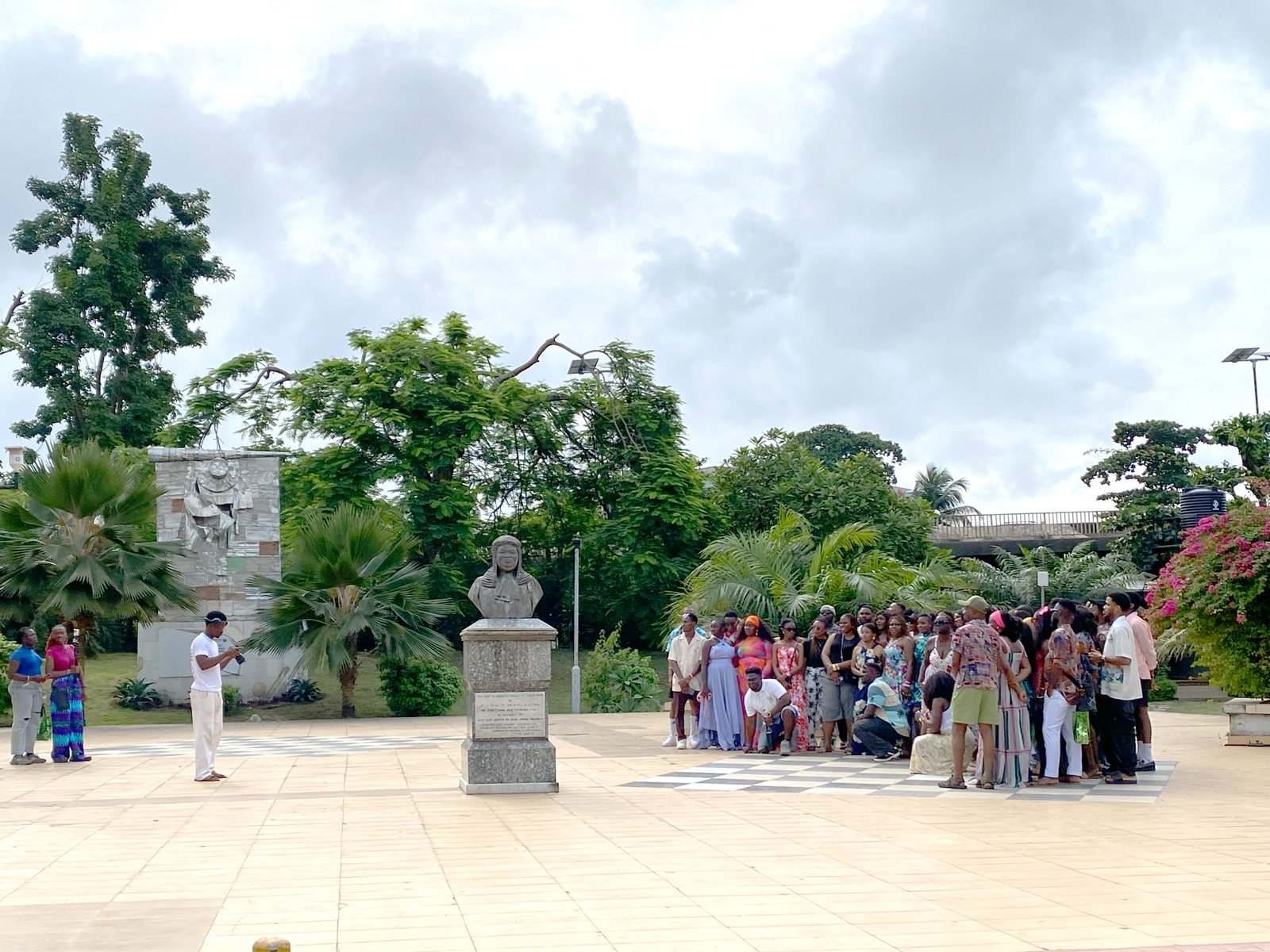
Muri Okunola Park

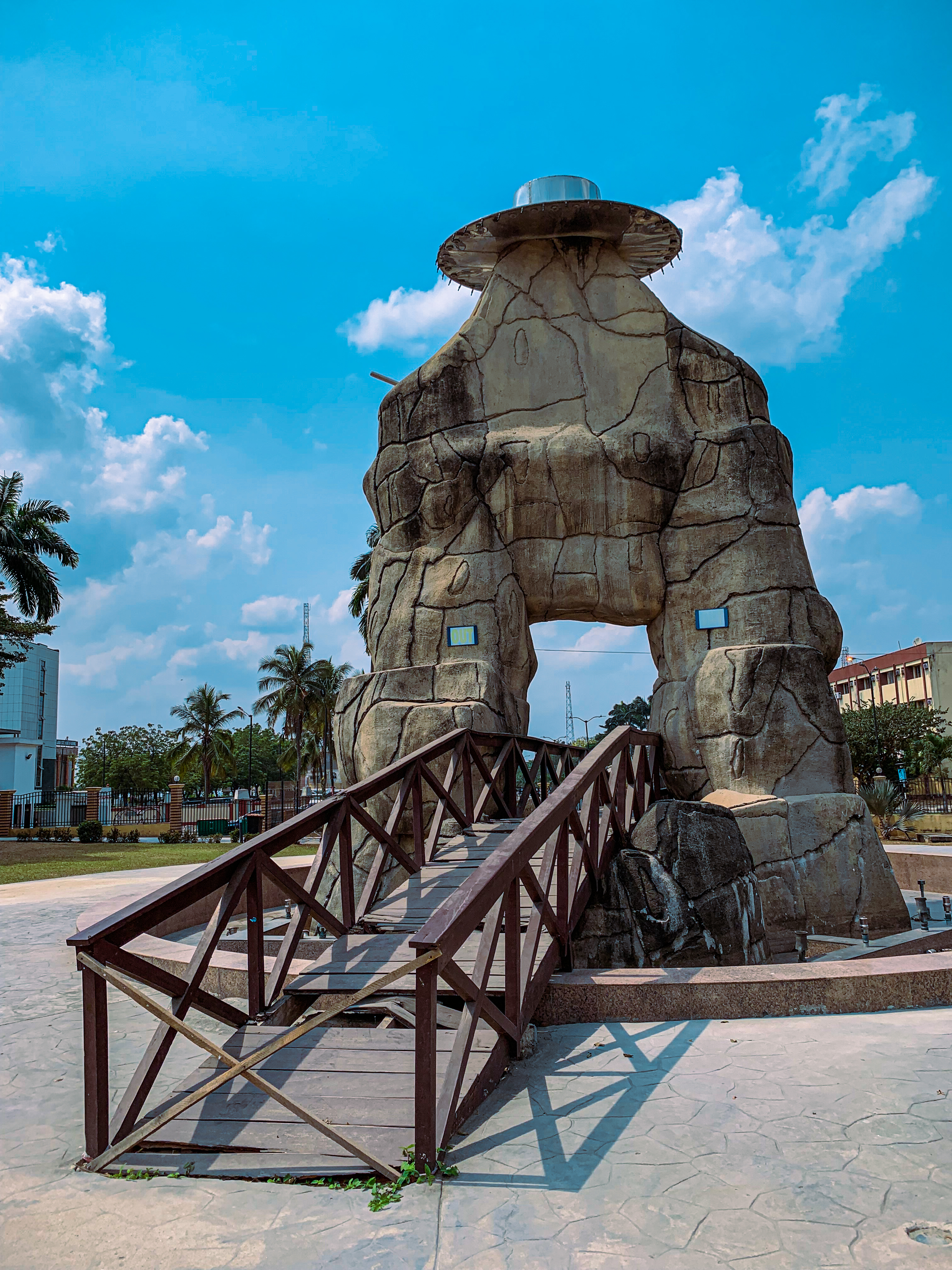
Johnson Jakande Tinubu Park

Jhalobia Gardens

Orchid at Jhalobia Gardens

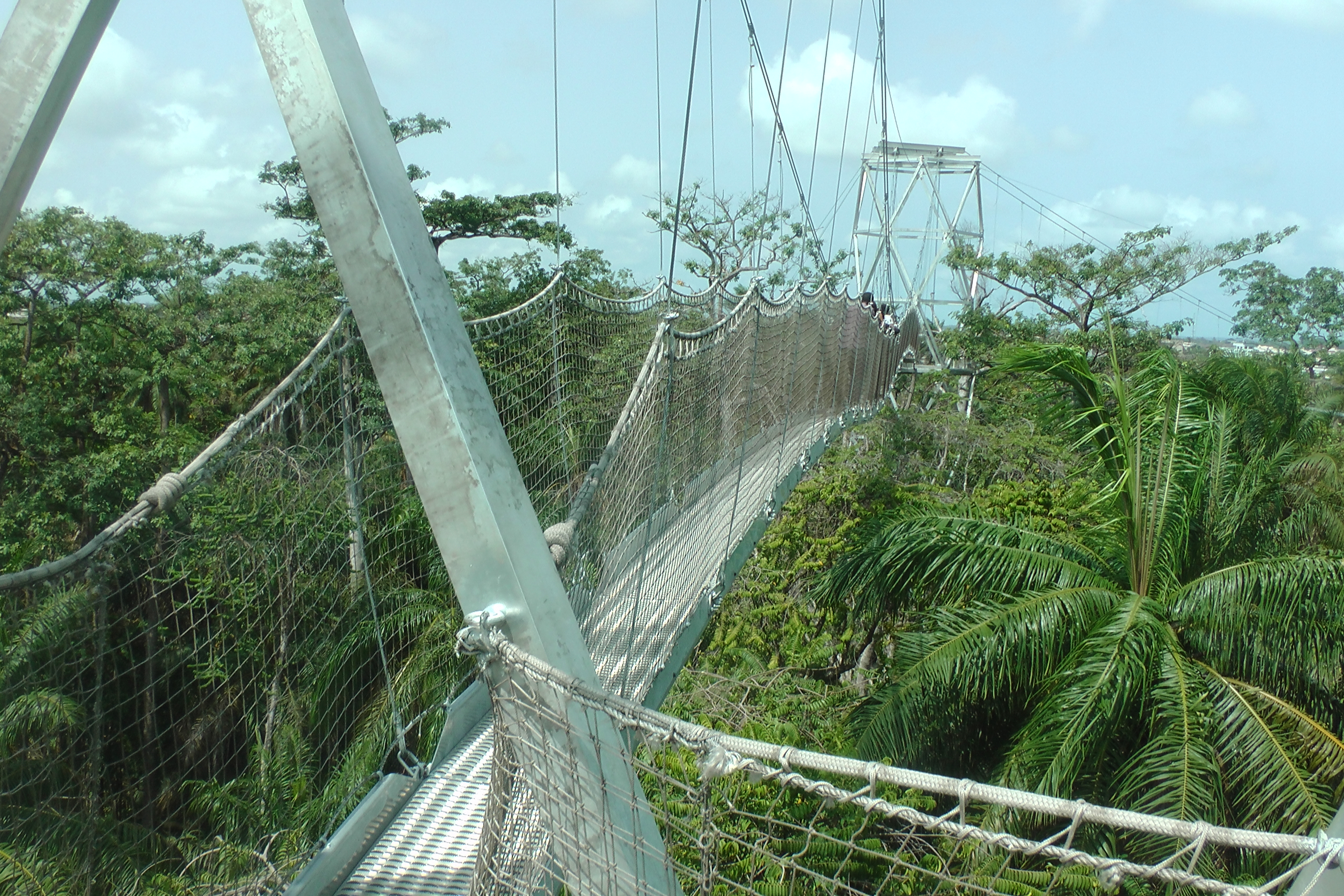
Canopy walk at the Lekki Conservation Centre

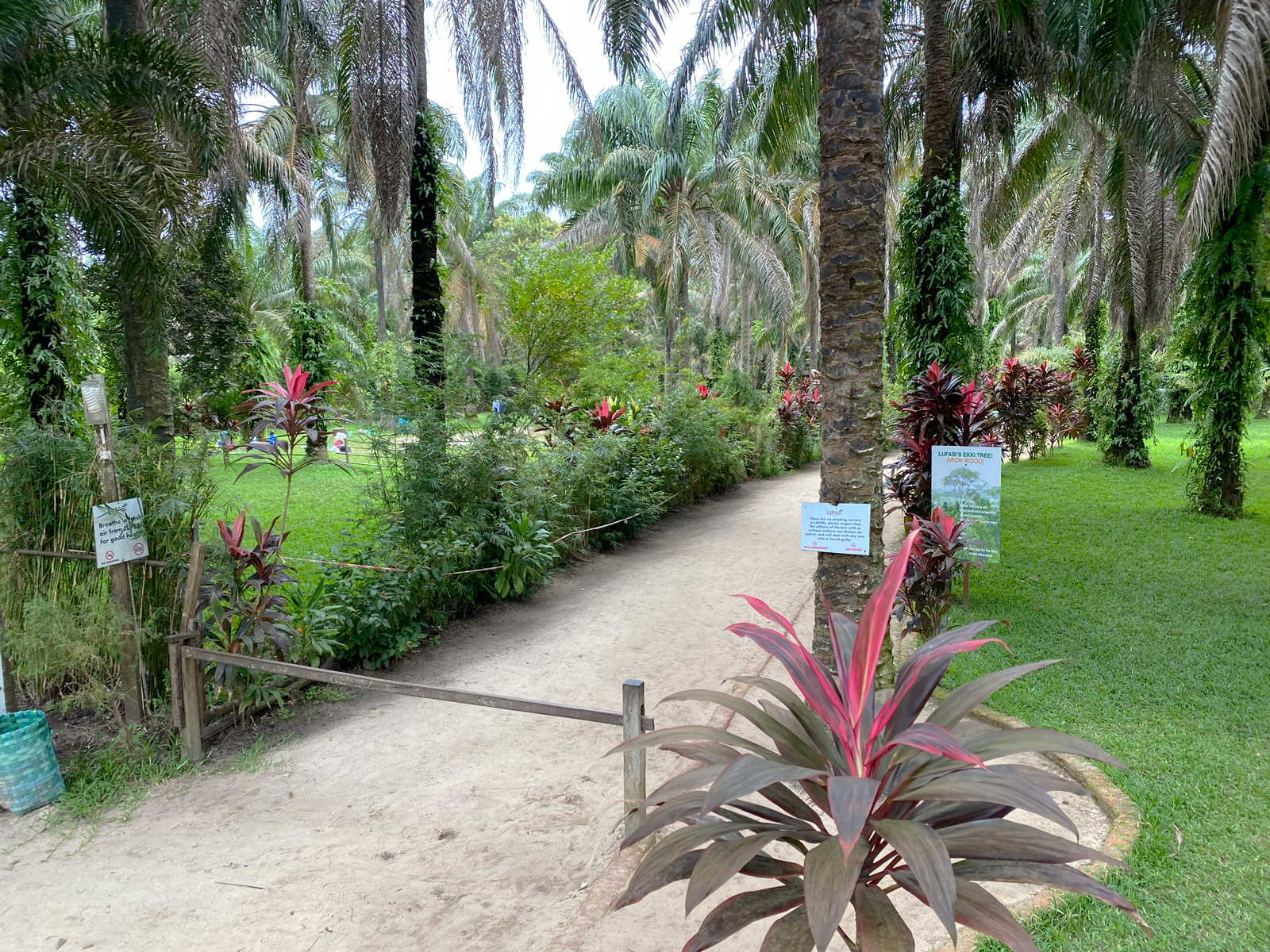
LUFASI Nature Park

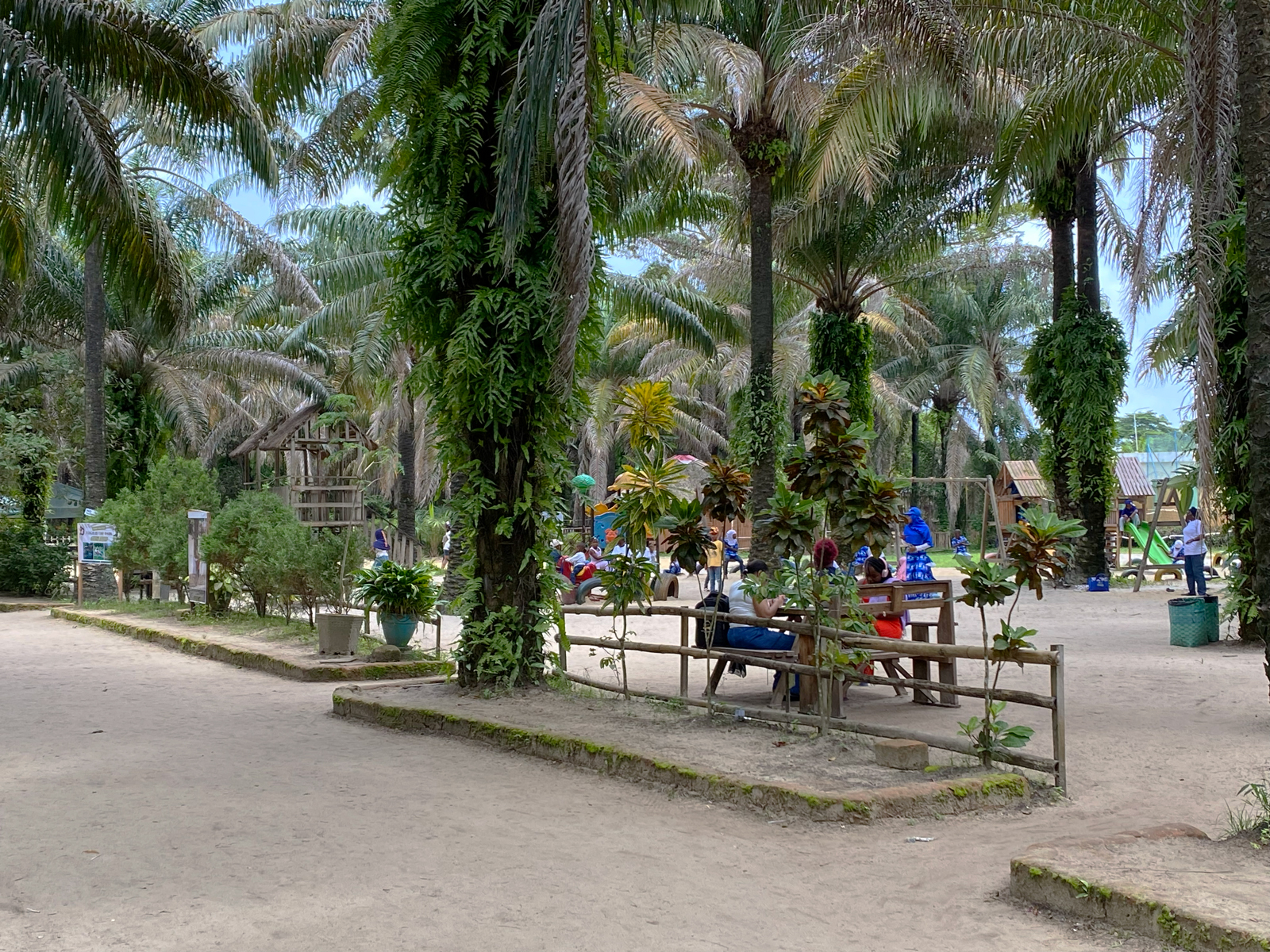
LUFASI Nature Park

== Transportation ==
Lagos has one of the largest and most extensive road networks in West Africa. It also has suburban trains and some ferry services. Highways are usually congested in peak hours owing to the geography of the city and to its explosive population growth. Lagos is also linked by many highways and bridges.

=== Expressways ===
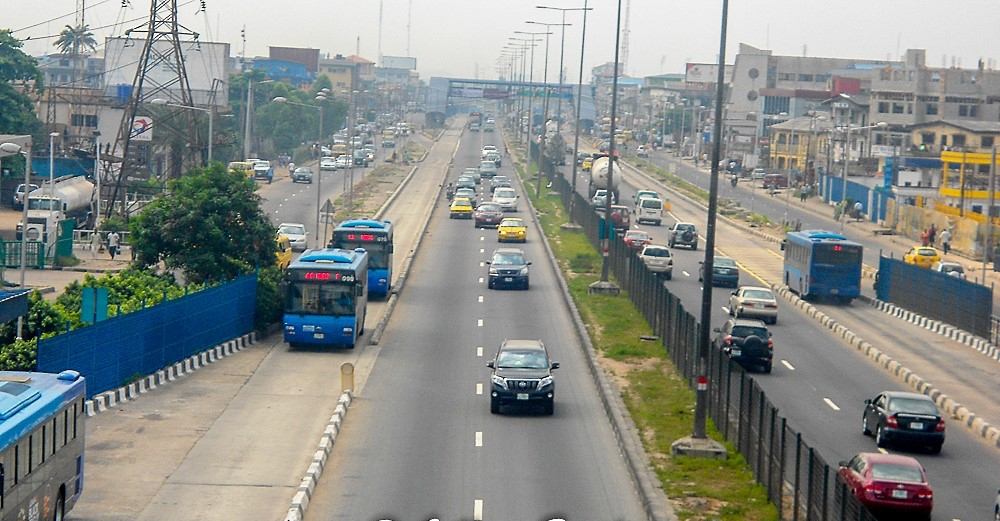
Expressway A1 at Lagos-Onipanu with bus lane

Since 2023, the renovation of existing motorways and the construction of new ones have been central to the government policy of President Bola Tinubu, who – through the floating of the national currency, the abolition of petrol subsidies and the introduction of a general income tax – has been able to channel more funds into infrastructure than his predecessors. Motorways under the jurisdiction of the Nigerian federal government are in significantly better condition than the access roads (which are administered at federal and local levels).

Beginning of the Coastal Highway in Lagos (2026)

Lagos is (as of 2026) connected to the surrounding area via several motorways (‘expressways’):

- the F100; heading west towards Badagry and Porto-Novo in the Republic of Benin – its renovation was largely completed in 2026,
- the A5; heading north to Abeokuta and on to Ibadan – Nigeria’s busiest expressway (over 250,000 PCU daily), currently undergoing renovation (as of September 2026); contractor Craneburg reported in 2025 that 50 per cent of the renovation work had been completed,
- the A1; heading north-east directly to Ibadan – another key transport artery carrying just under 250,000 PCU daily between Nigeria’s largest and third-largest cities; the Nigerian federal government approved its renovation in 2026;
- the Lekki-Epe Expressway (no abbreviation) heading east-north-east; an intra-state motorway in Lagos State and one of the first Nigerian expressways on which a toll was levied;
- the Coastal Highway (no abbreviation as yet) running eastwards, initially from the city centre to the Free Trade Zone, the Dangote Refinery and the Lekki Deep-Sea Port (approximately 60 km), and upon completion as far as Calabar; the President’s ‘pet project’, for which he bypassed parliamentary procedures to push through its construction and dispatched the first construction machinery to the planned section of the route just a few days after his swearing-in;
- still under construction is the Badagry–Sokoto Expressway (another project of the Tinubu government), running northwards along the border with the Republic of Benin, which is intended to develop the structurally underdeveloped far west and will scrape the Lagos metropolitan area; the first section from Badagry to Ilaro is (as of August 2026) complete, according to vloggers, and is being used by local traffic.

Lagos's importance as a commercial centre and port and its strategic location have led to it being the end-point of three Trans-African Highway routes using Nigeria's national roads. The Trans–West African Coastal Highway leaves the city as the Badagry Expressway to Benin and beyond as far as Dakar and Nouakchott; the Trans-Sahara Highway to Algiers, which is close to completion, leaves the city as the Lagos-Ibadan Expressway. – However, the term ‘Trans-African Highway’ (according to the Wikipedia entry) is ‘not in wide common usage outside of planning and development circles, and as of 2014 one does not see them signposted as such or labelled on maps’. ‘Trans-African Highway’ therefore really only represents a planning proposal dating from 2007. Instead, the term ‘Trans-African corridors’ is therefore more commonly used. – Infrastructure planning in Africa that spans several states faces challenges given the political instability of some of the countries involved. Furthermore, due to existing disparities in prosperity, the Economic Community of West African States, ECOWAS, is unable to fulfil the role in coordinating international transport projects that the European Union, for example, plays.

=== Intercity railway line ===
Mobolaji Johnson, terminus station of the standard gauge railway line to Ibadan

Since 2021, a railway line has linked Lagos to Ibadan (via Abeokuta), a city situated 120 km further north-east, deep in the interior of the country (Ibadan is the country’s third-largest city after Lagos and Kano). The journey takes two and a half hours and costs 9,000 naira (6 euros) in first class. The locomotives, carriages and station buildings are new and modern. Six trains run daily on this line.

The railway line, built to standard gauge (1,436 mm), replaced a route dating from the colonial era and built to ‘Cape’ gauge (1,056 mm between the rails). This allows for higher speeds. This new rail link is stimulating local economic growth.

The Chinese state-owned enterprises CCECC and CRRC played a decisive role in the construction and are evidence of the growing influence of the People’s Republic of China in Africa.

The rail link is managed by the Nigerian Railway Corporation, which reports to the Nigerian federal government.

=== Air traffic ===
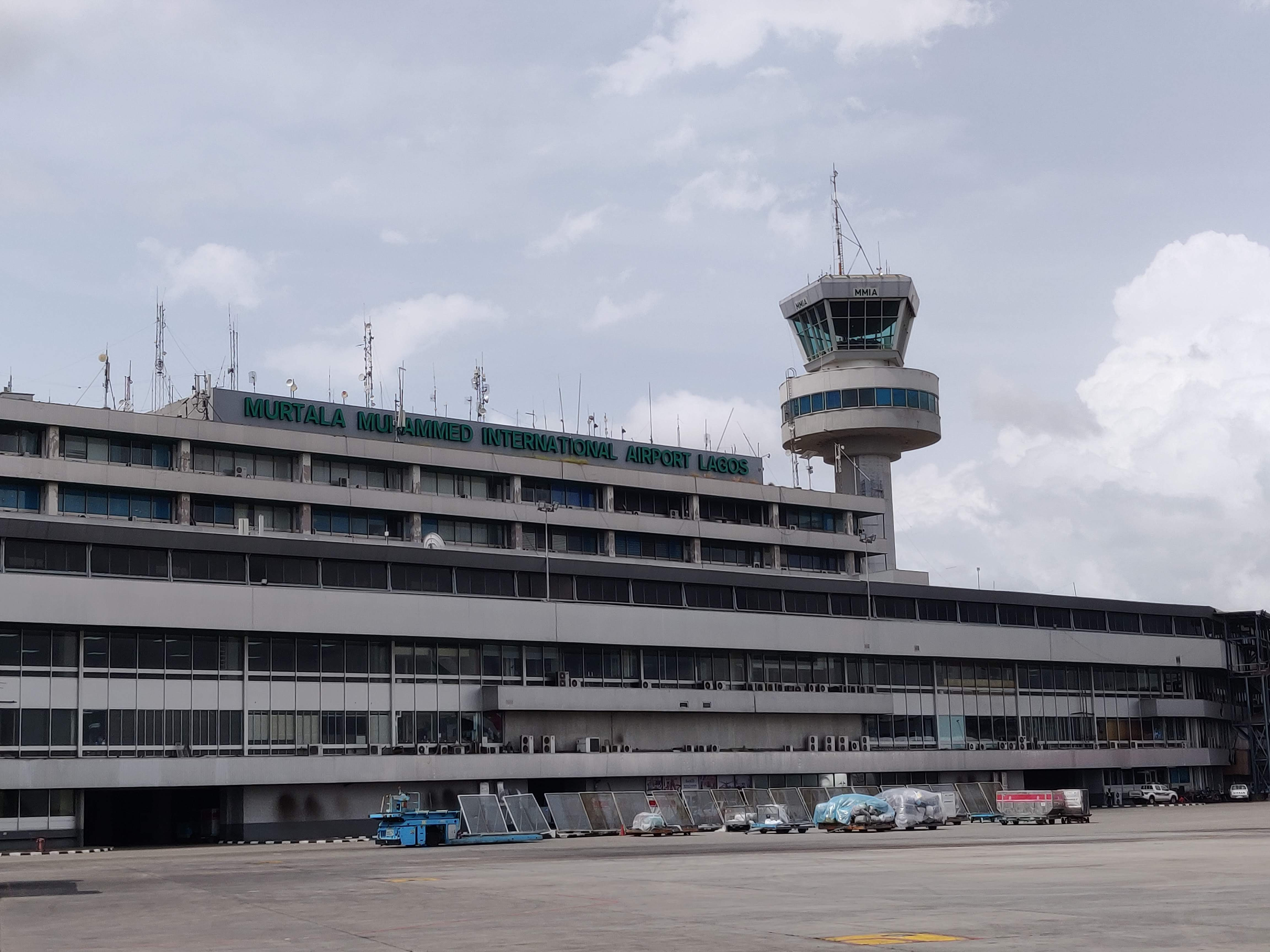
Murtala Muhammed International Airport

Lagos is served by Murtala Muhammed International Airport, one of the largest and busiest airports in Africa. The MMIA is Nigeria's premier international air gateway. The airport's history dates back to colonial times, around the time of the Second World War. The international airport terminal was built and commissioned over 40 years ago, in 1978. The terminal opened officially on 15 March 1979. The airport had been known simply as the Lagos International Airport. It was, however, renamed for the late Nigerian Head of State, General Murtala Muhammed, who died in 1976.

The airport terminal has been renovated several times since the 1970s but its most radical makeover began in 2013, following the launch of the Federal government's multi-billion naira Remodelling/ Rehabilitation Programme for its airports nationwide. Under the re-modeling work there, by late in 2014, the MMA lounge area had been expanded to four times its previous size and new passenger handling conveyor systems were installed which can handle over 1,000 passengers per hour.

A second airport, Lekki-Epe International Airport has been approved by the Federal Government in April 2023.

=== Local public transport ===
The Lagos Metropolitan Area Transport Authority (LAMATA) is responsible for public transport.

Since 2021, using a bus or the light rail system is paid for with a public transport card without cash. This card can be used equally on BRT and LBSL buses. One can purchase a public transportation card at any of the ticketing booths at the bus terminals scattered across Lagos State.

==== City buses ====
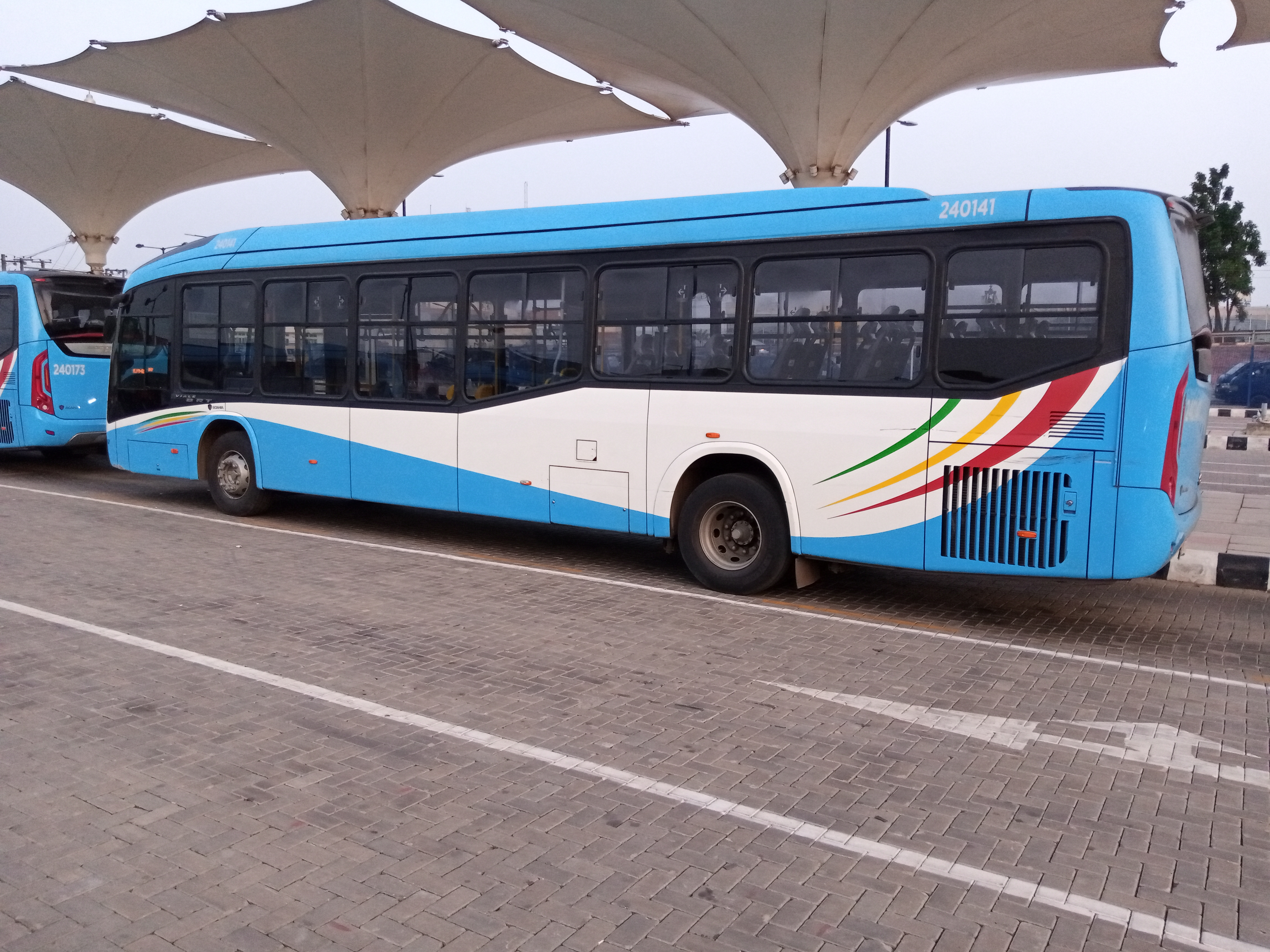
BRT bus in Lagos

There are two city bus companies in Lagos: BRT (Lagos Bus Rapid Transit System) and LBSL (Lagos Bus Services). The city buses are air-conditioned. (However, during the Covid epidemic, the AC had to be switched off at all times.)

BRT was inaugurated in 2008. BRT offers e-payment with bank cards. On two arterial roads (Ikorodu Road and Funsho Williams Avenue), a dedicated bus lane has been established for BRT buses. BRT uses diverse brands of buses, like Ashok Leyland and Yutong. Primero Transport Services (PTS) Ltd. is the sole operator of the BRT buses.

Before the new big bus automated system, Lagos used to depend on the popular big bus called "Molue" which only very few can still be found plying the Lagos road especially within Oshodi - Iyana Ipaja to Sango route.

LBSL was inaugurated in 2019. LBSL uses Brazilian-built Marcopolo buses.

The central hub for city buses and long-distance buses is the Oshodi Bus Terminal, which is visible from afar. It is the largest bus station in West Africa and commenced operation in 2019.

The Lagos Transportation Department, LAMATA, introduced electric buses in Lagos in May 2023.

==== Metro rail ====
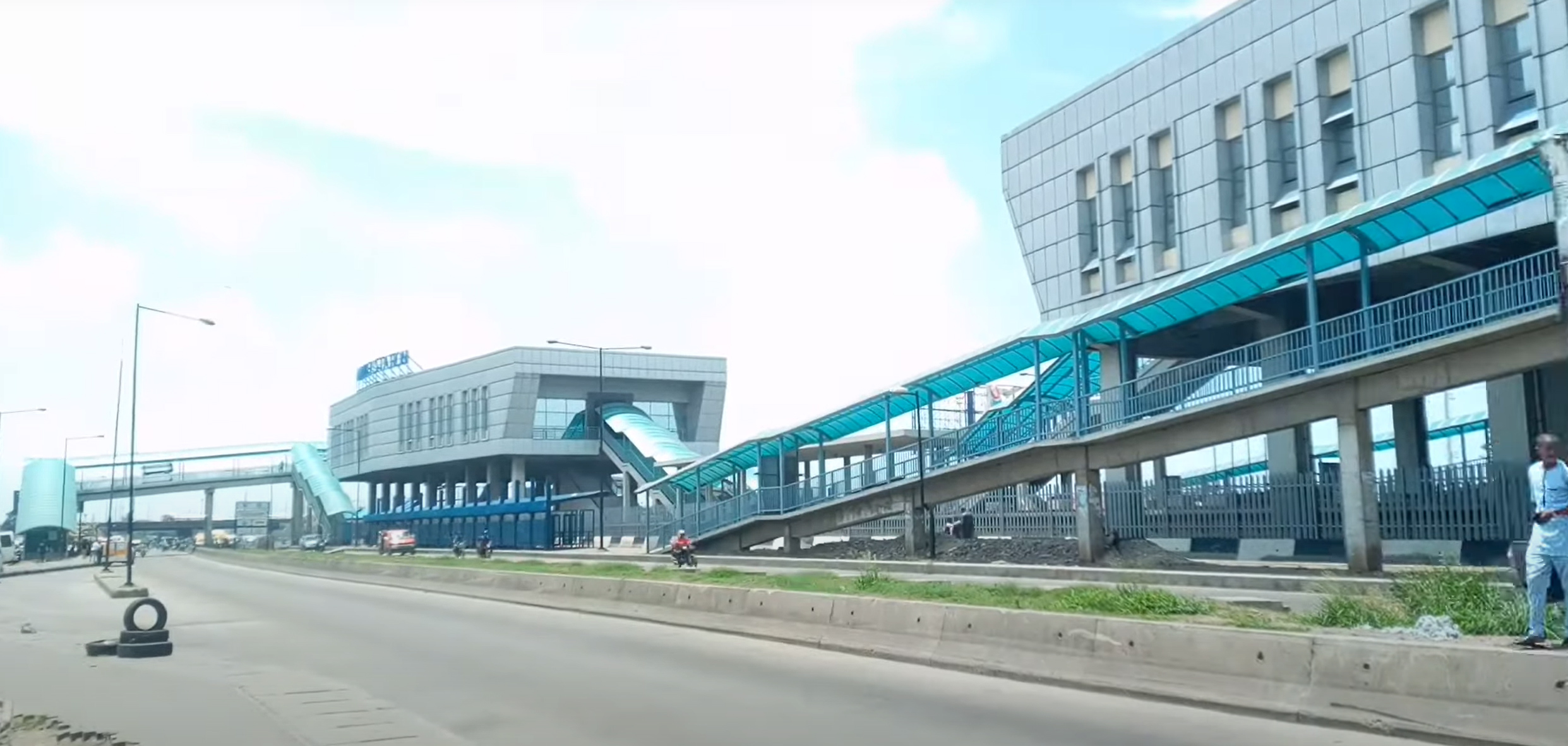
Station "Mile 2", current terminus station of the blue line (2026)

The rapid transit system, the Lagos Light Rail, has been operational since February 2023. The "Blue Line" runs between Mile 2 and Marina (East-west axis). The ''Red Line'' runs between Agbado and Oyingbo (North–south axis). The Lagos light rail system has been in operation since 2023 and, since 2024, has comprised two lines: the blue and the red lines. Both lines run above ground and, in the city centre, on stilts, i.e. a few metres above the ground.

Here, too, passengers use the ‘Cowry’ prepaid card, as is already the case on the city buses.

On 4 September 2026, the operator LAMATA announced on Facebook that the blue line had carried 9 million passengers over the past 36 months across 70,000 scheduled train runs. A train runs every 10 minutes on the Blue Line. The network claims that 99.5 per cent of trains run on time.

In 2026, work will be completed on extending the Blue Line to Okokomaiko, and the construction of a ‘Green Line’ is planned (which is also to run partly on piles). The three lines are to be connected at Marina station (the French Development Agency, AFD, is involved in this project).

Metro station "Mile 2" (terminus blue line)

Metro station "Babatunde Fashola" (red line)

Metro station Agege, "Lateef Jakande" (red line)

Metro station Ikeja (red line)

Metro station Okokomaiko (under construction in 2026)

==== Shared cabs ====
A popular means of transportation are yellow minibuses called "Danfo" or "Faragan" as popularly called. The yellow buses, most of the VW T3 or LT type, characterize the appearance of the city. They run on fixed routes but without a timetable, according to the principle of shared cabs.

==== Ferries ====
According to residents, getting to work by car in Lagos can take six times longer than by ferry. About two million passengers were recorded by the Ferry Authority per month in 2021.

Five Cowries Terminal is the central terminal for ferry operations in Lagos. The terminal is located on the lagoon between Lagos Island and Victoria Island and was commissioned on 30 August 2018. Five Cowries also serves as the headquarters of the Lagos State Waterways Authority (LASWA). It has a jetty, restaurant, bar, administrative offices, ticket offices, waiting area, toilets, lift, conference room, and ATMs. Boats from private individuals and other operators also dock at the pier. The terminal also has a multi-storey car park with space for over 800 vehicles. The multi-storey car park is located behind the terminal (as seen from the lagoon) and is directly connected to the terminal. The terminal was built without thresholds and there is a toilet for wheelchair users. Five Cowries is open seven days a week, from 8.00 am to 5.00 pm. The terminal is located next to the Falomo Bridge. The destinations of LASWA ferries are Marina, Ikoyi, Victoria Island, Lekki, Apapa, Ikorodu and Badagry.

== Healthcare ==
Duchess hospital in Ikeja

In the summer of 2014, Lagos’s often underestimated healthcare system proved its worth when it successfully contained an Ebola outbreak. Dr Ameyo Stella Adadevoh was the specialist at the First Consultants Medical Centre in Lagos, Nigeria, who identified and isolated the first Ebola case (Patrick Sawyer) in July 2014. Her refusal to discharge the patient, despite diplomatic pressure, saved countless lives by containing the spread of the virus.

=== General and specialist hospitals ===
Reddington Hospital on Victoria Island

Lagos has many hospitals and medical facilities. The oldest Nigerian hospital is located in the city as well as West Africa's first air-operated emergency medical service, which commenced in the city. The Lagos healthcare system is divided into public and private sectors that provide medical services at the primary, secondary, and tertiary levels.

Of the numerous hospitals in Lagos, the following are highlighted in particular in articles:

- Lagoon Hospital, private, international standard, ‘one of Nigeria’s foremost private tertiary care providers’,
- St Nicholas Hospital, private, international standard, ‘multi-specialty tertiary care center with a legacy of clinical excellence’,
- EKO Hospital, private, international standard, ‘multi-specialty tertiary care center offering a broad spectrum of services’,
- Reddington Hospital, international standard, ‘leading private hospital in Lagos, known for its comprehensive emergency services’, accredited by COHSASA,
- Euracare Multi-Specialist Hospital, ‘best urology clinic in Nigeria’,
- First Consultant Medical Centre, private, ‘has treated Nigerian presidents’,
- Paelon Memorial Hospital, 5-star SafeCare award for quality.

In 2025, at the “Prostate Clinic” on Victoria Island, West Africa’s first robotic operation using a minimally invasive procedure was successfully performed on a man with prostate cancer under the supervision of Prof. Kingsley Ekwueme.

== Quality of life ==
Opinions on the quality of life in Lagos vary widely.

In 2023, Lagos ranked second – behind Manila – in a global survey by the Statista Research Department of cities with the lowest quality of life. – By contrast, from 2024 through 2026, Lagos has featured each year in Time Out magazine's list of the "50 Best Cities in the World", based on the Time Out Index web survey of locals. In the 2024 survey, 96 percent of respondents said they were happy, and in every year, over two-thirds of respondents have said that it is easy to make friends in Lagos. "Business Day" adds that Lagos remains a major cultural and economic centre characterised by its vibrancy, diversity and population density. The city has also made a name for itself through its music and creative industries. In 2023, Brand Finance ranked Lagos fifth among the most desirable cities in Africa, behind Cape Town and Johannesburg, Cairo and Casablanca, but ahead of Nairobi. The survey involved 15,000 respondents across 20 countries.

By way of qualification, it must be made clear that index lists of countries or cities are usually not based on verifiable or locally collected data, but often on subjective assessments by Europeans or North Americans. The CPI of Transparency International, for example, is, according to its own definition, "based on the perceived assessment of lay people and experts and is not reduced to actual experience and its analysis". There is criticism that the indices determined simply reflect the prejudices of Western countries numerically.

== Social situation, informal economy ==
There is a huge spectrum of wealth distribution among the people that reside in Lagos. It ranges from the very wealthy to the very poor. Lagos has attracted many young people and families seeking a better life from all other parts of Nigeria and beyond.

In some parts of Lagos, residents have one of the highest standards of living in Nigeria and in Africa.

Reliable data on unemployment, income below the subsistence level, etc. are hardly available for Lagos – as for the whole region – and must be taken with skepticism where they are provided, e.g. in other articles (see also the previous chapter). The reason for this is the widespread "informal economy" (not to be confused with "shadow economy") in West Africa. Insufficient jobs in traditional wage labour force people to look for work elsewhere. This benefits the informal sector of the economy, where there is no minimum wage and workers pay no taxes, have no holiday or labour rights and often work in unsafe conditions.

According to the International Monetary Fund, about 5.5 million people are employed in the informal economy in Lagos State alone – about three-quarters of Lagos's workforce. Throughout Lagos, one can observe street vendors, artisans, sellers, small and micro enterprises, shared taxis, tricycles and motorbikes (okada drivers), domestic workers, market traders and others engaged in the informal sector.

Activities in the informal economy are not included in economic statistics. As a result, the wealth of the population, but also e.g. unemployment, is significantly underestimated if the massive informal economy is not taken into account.

== Recycling, sewage and water supply ==
=== Recycling/waste management ===
In Lagos, only 40 percent of waste is collected and only 13 percent is recycled. 13,000 tonnes of waste are generated daily in the metropolis. Some residents burn their waste, which exacerbates pollution.

=== Water supply ===
Tap water in Lagos is not suitable for drinking, but can be used for other purposes such as cooking and showering. The water in the distribution network is often contaminated. Since the raw water in the lagoon is too polluted, the city draws its water from the Ogun and Owo rivers. There has been debate about the poor water quality in Lagos for years. At the same time, a sizable proportion of the residents live in slums without access to piped water and sanitation.

=== Sewage ===
An efficient sewage system is lacking. Sewage is flushed into the open sewerage system by rainwater. This water then carries pollutants into rivers and the lagoon. Sewage also enters groundwater through leaking septic tanks and latrines. The contaminants can then contaminate the water in wells and boreholes. Water sold by street vendors can also be affected, as it comes from the same sources.

== Twin towns – sister cities ==
Lagos is twinned with:

- Atlanta, Georgia, United States
- Gary, Indiana, United States
- Belo Horizonte, Brazil
- Bucharest, Romania
- Port of Spain, Trinidad and Tobago

== See also ==
- List of largest cities
- List of governors of Lagos State
- Benin City
