= Lagos State =

State in Nigeria

Lagos State: Ìpínlẹ̀ Èkó (Yoruba); Ayìmátẹ̀n Awọnlìn tọ̀n (Gun)
- State
- Flag Seal
- Nicknames: Las Gidi, Gidi
- Motto: Centre of Excellence
- Location of Lagos State in Nigeria
- Coordinates: 6°35′N 3°45′E
- Country: Nigeria
- Geopolitical Zone: South West
- Date created: 27 May 1967
- Capital: Ikeja
- LGAs: 20

Government
  - Body: Government of Lagos State
  - Governor: Babajide Sanwo-Olu (APC)
  - Deputy Governor: Femi Hamzat (APC)
  - Speaker, House of Assembly: Rt. Hon. Mudashiru Obasa
  - Chief Judge: Kazeem Alogba
  - National Assembly delegation: Senators: C: Wasiu Sanni (APC) E: Tokunbo Abiru (APC) W: Oluranti Adebule (APC); Representatives: List

Area
  - Total: 3,577 km^{2} (1,381 sq mi)
  - Rank: 36th of 36

Population (2026 census)
  - Total: 14,881,845
  - Estimate (2022 by National Bureau of Statistics, 2020 by LASG): 13,491,800; 35,000,000
  - Rank: 1st/2nd of 36
  - Density: 4,160/km^{2} (10,780/sq mi)
- Demonym: Lagosian

GDP
  - Year: 2021
  - Total: $102 billion (nominal) $267 billion (PPP); 1st of 36
  - Per capita: $6,614 (nominal) $17,282 (PPP); 1st of 36
- Time zone: UTC+1 (WAT)
- ISO 3166 code: NG-LA
- HDI (2023): 0.721 high · 1st of 37
- Website: lagosstate.gov.ng

Lagos State (Yoruba: Ìpínlẹ̀ Èkó, Gun: Ayìmátẹ̀n Awọnlìn tọ̀n) is a state in southwestern Nigeria. Of the 36 states, Lagos is the first or second most populous state (depending on the source) but is the smallest by area. Bounded to the south by the Bight of Benin and to the west by the international border with the Republic of Benin, Lagos State borders Ogun State to the north and east, making it the only Nigerian state to border only one other state. Named for the city of Lagos — the most populous city in Africa — the state was formed from the Western Region and the former Federal Capital Territory on 27 May 1967.

Geographically, Lagos State is dominated by bodies of water with nearly a quarter of the state's area being lagoons, creeks, and rivers. The largest of these bodies are the Lagos and Lekki lagoons in the state's interior with the Ogun and Osun rivers flowing into them. Many other rivers and creeks flow throughout the state and serve as vital means of transportation for people and goods. On land, non-urbanized areas are within the tropical Nigerian lowland forests ecoregion with natural areas containing threatened populations of mona monkey, tree pangolin, and hooded vulture along with a transitory population of African forest elephants. Offshore, the state is also biodiverse as there are large fish populations along with African manatees and crocodiles.

Lagos State has been inhabited for years by various indigenous ethnic groups, primarily the majority Yoruba people who live throughout the state but also the Ewe and Ogu peoples in the far west. As a result of migration since the nineteenth century, Lagos State also has large populations of non-native Nigerian ethnic groups with Edo, Efik, Fulani, Hausa, Igbo, Ijaw, Ibibio, and Nupe peoples among other Nigerian groups. There are also groups from outside of Nigeria's modern borders with the Saro (Sierra Leonean) and Amaro (Brazilian) groups being descendants of formerly enslaved people who returned to Africa in the 1800s with a longstanding Middle Eastern Nigerian community (mainly Syrian and Lebanese Nigerians) also forming a significant part of Lagos' population along with recent immigrants from Benin, China, Ghana, India, Togo, and the United Kingdom. Religiously, the state is also diverse, as there is a sizable number of Christian, Muslim and traditional ethnic religions.

In the pre-colonial period, the area that is now Lagos State was mainly fishing villages and ports that at various points were controlled by states including the Benin Empire and Oyo Empire until the early 1800s when the city of Lagos had developed into a major kingdom of its own right. In 1850, the British successfully attacked the kingdom in the Bombardment of Lagos before installing an ally as Oba and signing a treaty that established Lagos as being under British protection. Ten years later, the forced Lagos Treaty of Cession led to the formal establishment of the Lagos Colony. In 1906, the colony was incorporated into the new Southern Nigeria Protectorate which merged into British Nigeria in 1914 with the city of Lagos as its capital. Upon independence in 1960, Lagos remained as the capital with much of the city forming the Federal Capital Territory while the rest of modern-day Lagos State was a part of the Western Region until 1967 when the region was split and the area became Lagos State.

Economically, Lagos State is one of the fastest-growing urban areas in the world. It contains the most populous city in Nigeria and one of the most important states in the country, a major financial centre and has one of the largest economies in Africa with a gross domestic product of $84 billion comparable with Ghana's $75 billion, Angola's $70 billion, and Ethiopia's $93 billion. Lagos State is also a key culture, education, and transportation hub for Nigeria and Sub-Saharan Africa. Additionally, the state also has the highest literacy rate in Nigeria. It is known for its vibrant culture, bustling markets, and significant economic activities. Despite overcrowding and chronic debilitating traffic, Lagos State has the highest Human Development Index in Nigeria and numerous development projects.

== History ==
=== Early history ===
Before the Portuguese name of Lagos had been adopted, Lagos' initial name was Eko which referred mainly to the Island. The first to settle in Eko were the Aworis. Trade later drew various groups to the island, including the Portuguese in the 16th century. The Awori hunters and fishermen had originally come from Ile-Ife to the coast.

It was in 1760 that the name Lagos was adopted by the Portuguese. Naming it after a city in Southern Portugal which was used as port for slave trade.

=== British Involvement ===
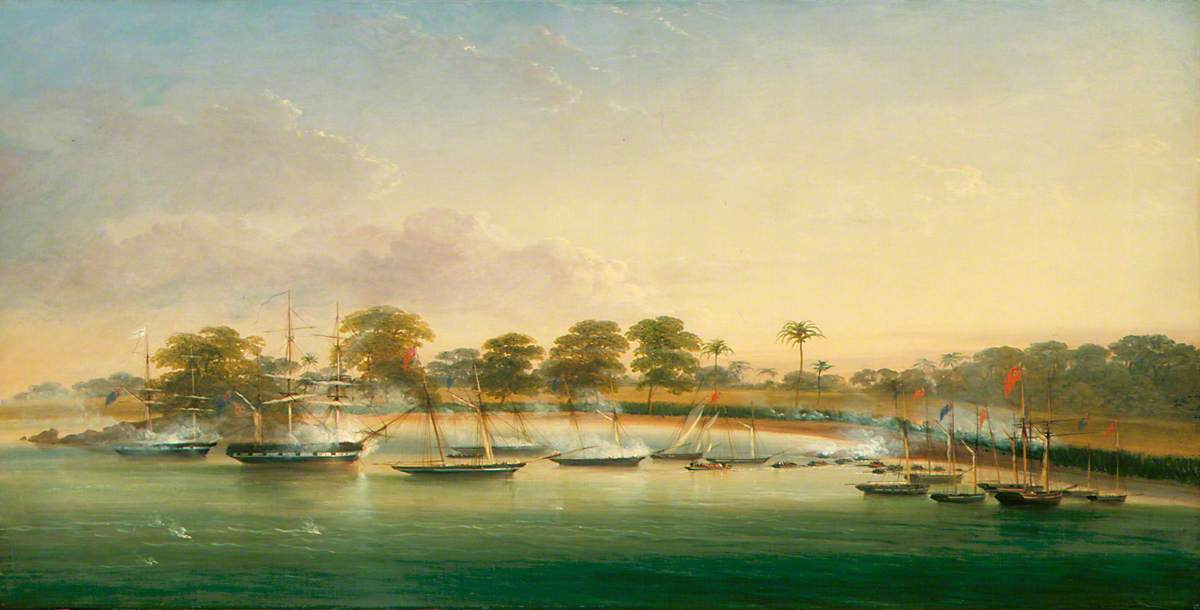

In late 1851, the British Royal Navy bombarded Lagos (in present-day Nigeria) in the "Reduction of Lagos." The attack aimed to suppress the Atlantic slave trade, which had thrived in Lagos since the arrival of the Portuguese. The British sought to depose Oba Kosoko, who resisted efforts to end the trade. After Kosoko fled, the British installed Oba Akitoye, a more cooperative ruler aligned with their anti-slavery efforts. In 1861, Oba Docemo was the one who signed the treaty making Lagos a British colony.

=== Post-colonial era ===
Lagos State was created on 27 May 1967 according to the State Creation and Transitional Provisions Decree No. 14 of 1967, which restructured Nigeria into a federation of 12 states. Before the issuance of this Decree, Lagos city, which was the country's capital had been administered directly by the Federal Government through the Federal Ministry of Lagos Affairs. However, Ikeja, Agege, Mushin, Ikorodu, Epe, Surulere, and Badagry were administered by the then Western Region Government. Lagos, the city, along with these other towns were captured to create the state of Lagos, with the state becoming fully recognized as a semi-autonomous administrative division on 11 April 1968. Lagos served the dual role of being the State and Federal Capital until 1976 when the capital of the state was moved to Ikeja. After the full establishment of the Federal Capital Territory, based on the recommendation of the Akinola Àgùdà–led committee set up by General Murtala Muhammed to review the need for a new capital for Nigeria in 1975. The seat of the Federal Government was formally relocated to Abuja on 12 December 1991. Nevertheless, Lagos remains the financial centre of the country, and even grew to become the most populous city in the state and the country.

== Cities and towns ==
=== Lagos ===
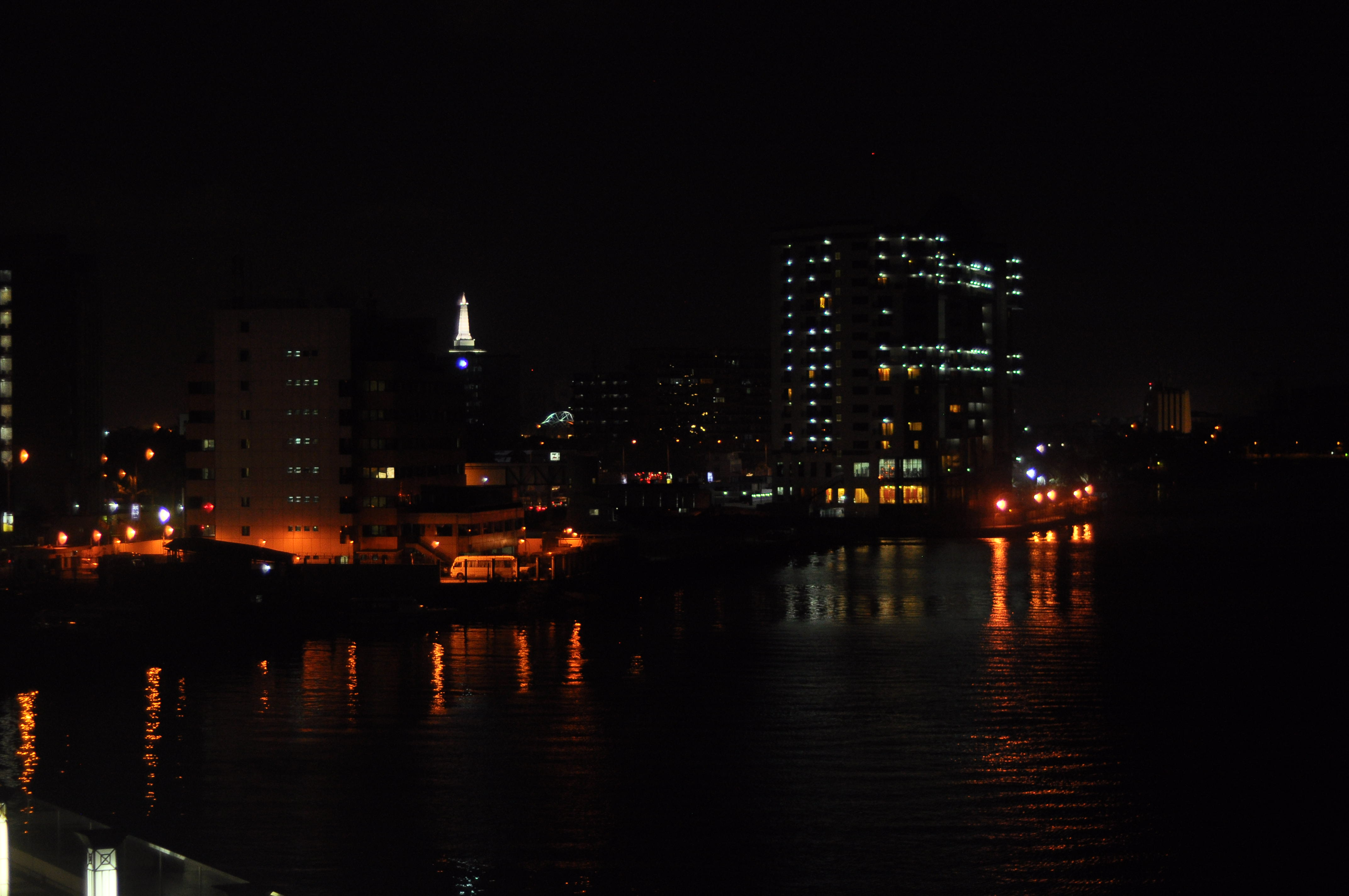

Lagos is the most populous city in Lagos State, Nigeria as a whole, and the continent of Africa. The conurbation is one of the most populous in the world. Lagos is a port which originated on islands separated by creeks, such as Lagos Island, fringing the southwest mouth of Lagos Lagoon while protected from the Atlantic Ocean by barrier islands and long sand spits such as Bar Beach, which stretch up to 100 kilometres (62 miles) east and west of the mouth. The metropolitan area of Lagos includes Ikeja (which is the capital of Lagos State) and Agege and Mushin.

=== Ikeja ===
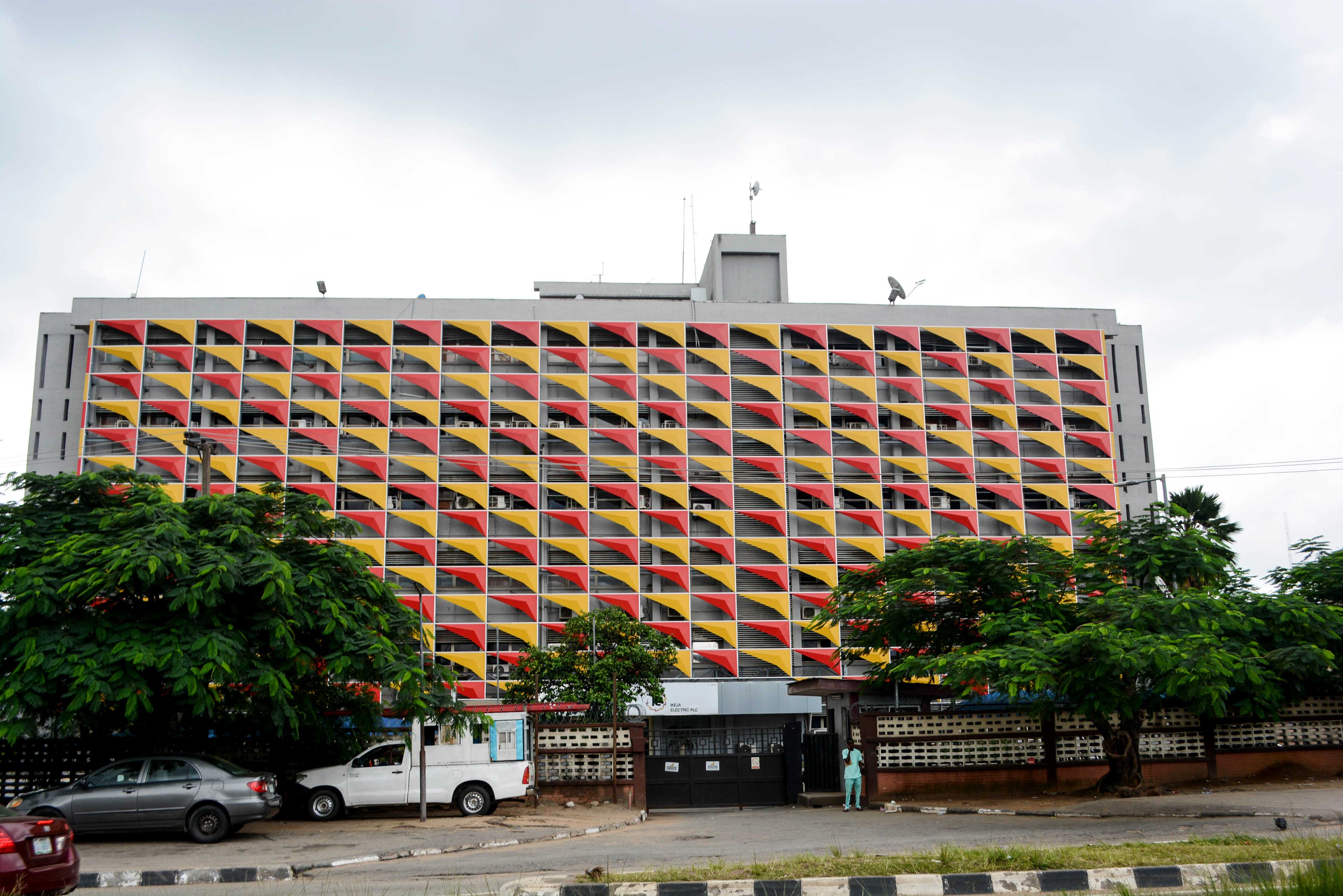

Ikeja is the state capital of Lagos State. Ikeja is a planned residential and commercial town with shopping malls, pharmacies and government reserved areas. The Murtala Mohammed International Airport is in Ikeja. Ikeja is also home to Fela Kuti's African Shrine, Late Chief Gani Fawehinmi house and Lagbaja's Motherland. It also has the largest shopping center on the mainland.

=== Lekki ===
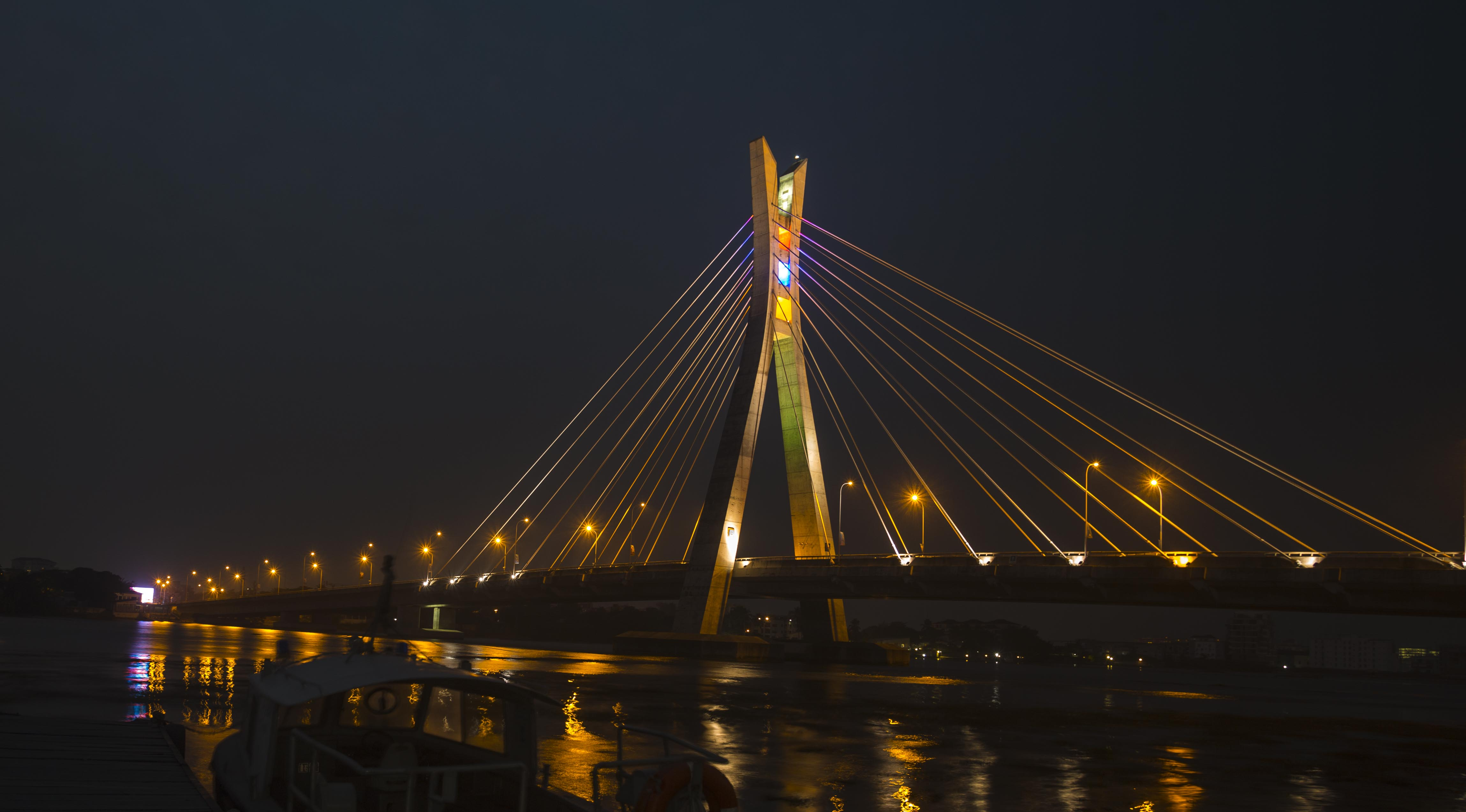

Lekki is a city in the south eastern part of the state. It is a naturally formed peninsula, it is still largely under construction. As of 2015, only phase 1 of the project had been completed, with phase 2 nearing completion. The peninsula is approximately 70 to 80 km long, with an average width of 10 km. Lekki currently houses several estates, gated residential developments, agricultural farmlands, areas allocated for a Free Trade Zone, an airport, and a sea port under construction. The proposed land use master plan for the Lekki envisages the Peninsula as a "Blue-Green Environment City", expected to accommodate over 3.4 million residential population and an additional non-residential population of at least 1.9 million.

=== Ikorodu ===
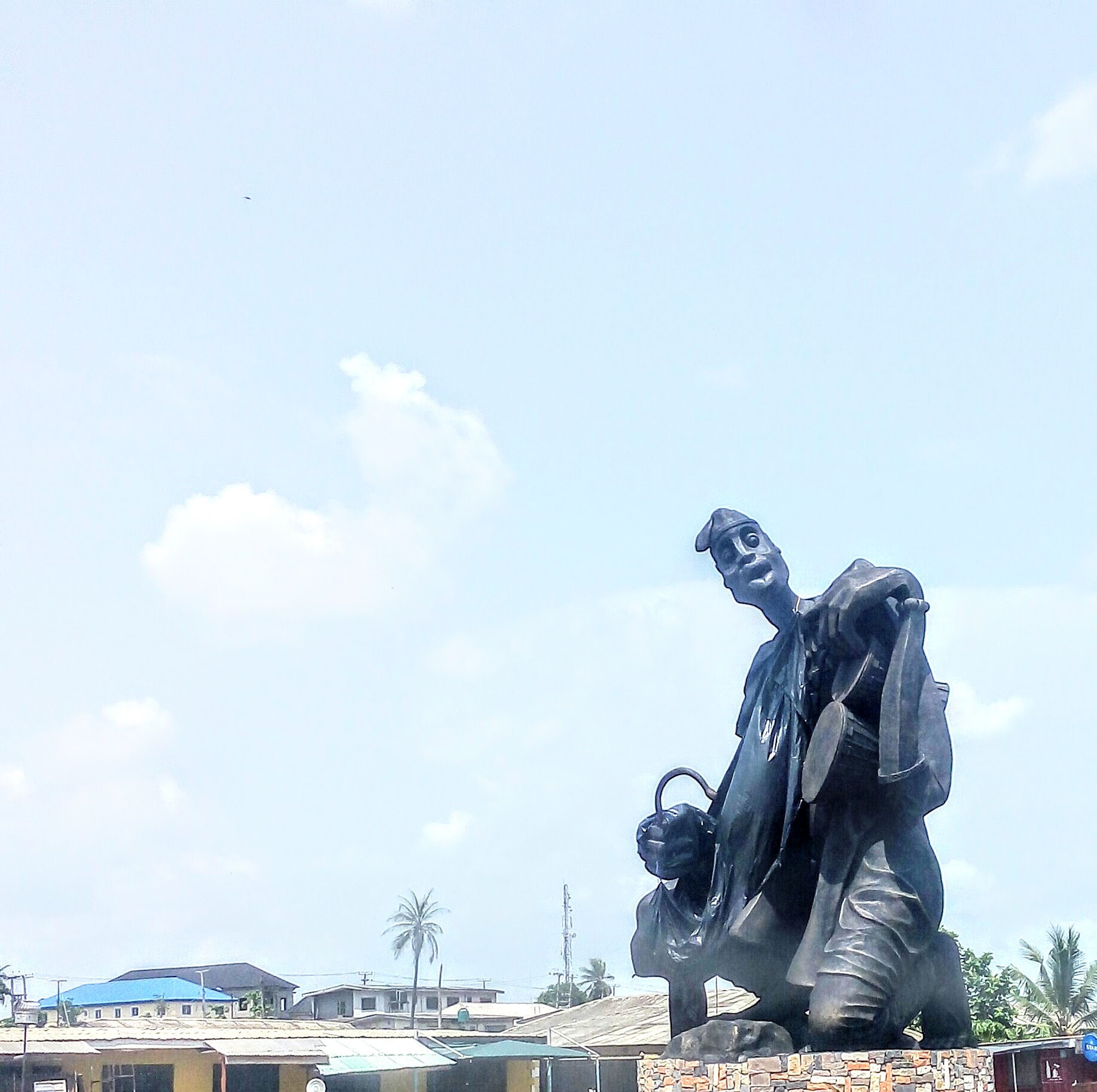

Ikorodu is a city located north-east of the state along the Lagos Lagoon. It shares a boundary with Ogun State. As of the 2006 Census, Ikorodu boosted population of about 535,619. It is the third largest city in the south-west after Ibadan and Lagos while it is the 12th largest city in Nigeria. In 2022, it had an estimated population of 1,041,066. The population of the city currently grows at 5.26% annually, and it is projected to reach 1.7 million by 2035.

=== Eko Atlantic ===
Eko Atlantic is a planned city being constructed on land reclaimed from the Atlantic Ocean. It is located on the former Lagos' Bar Beach. Upon completion, the new island which is still under development is anticipating at least 250,000 residents and a daily flow of at least 150,000 commuters. The development will also have a positive environmental impact; its purpose is to stop the erosion of the Lagos coastline. The Eko Atlantic City project received global recognition in 2009, as the Lagos State government and its private sector partners on the Project, South Energyx, received the Clinton Global Initiative Commitment Certificate.

=== Badagry ===
Badagry is a coastal town in the state. It is situated between Metropolitan Lagos, and the border of the Republic of Benin at Seme. As of the preliminary 2006 census results, the municipality had a population of 241,093. The area is led by a traditional king, Akran De Wheno Aholu Menu – Toyi 1, who is also the permanent vice-chairman of obas and chiefs in Lagos State. It is known to hold the country's oldest storey building. Badagry is home to the Ewe and Egun people who are predominantly fishermen.

=== Epe ===
Epe is a town located on the north side of the Lekki Lagoon. It is popular for the fishing activities attributed to the city. Per the 2006 Census the population of Epe was 181,409.

The Epe Fish Market is Lagos's largest seafood market.

Epe, like any other society, has special occasions and festivals where people come together to celebrate. Epe residents celebrate various festivals such as the Kayo-kayo festival, the Ebi bi festival, Ojude-Oba, and the Epe day.

Some campuses of popular higher education institutions in Lagos can be found within Epe. Lagos State University (LASU), Pan-Atlantic University (PAU), Yaba College of Technology, and Michael Otedola College of Primary Education are among them (MOCOPED).

Epe is also the birthplace of notable individuals such as former Lagos State Governor Akinwunmi Ambode and Nigerian businessman Femi Otedola.

=== Ojo ===
Ojo is a town predominantly inhabited by the Awori people, with a population of 507,693. It is home to several notable institutions, including Lagos State University and the Lagos State University of Education, formerly known as Adeniran Ogunsanya College of Education (AOCOED). The town also hosts the Federal Government College, Ijanikin, and the renowned Alaba International Market.

Lagos State, with a Gross domestic product (GDP) based on PPP in 2025 estimated to be over US$250 billion, is the major economic centre of Nigeria. The state's dynamic economy, driven by its bustling port, thriving tech scene, and a robust manufacturing sector, is continuously expanding, positioning Lagos as a significant global economic hub. If Lagos were an independent nation, it would rank among the top 30 economies globally and it would be the fifth largest economy in Africa. Lagos State houses headquarters of most conglomerates and commercial banks in Nigeria. The state has the lowest incidence of extreme poverty (around 1.3% of the population against a national average of 31%) of all states in Nigeria, according to World Bank data from 2018. Despite that, slums and poverty are a major issue in the Lagos area.

Its total generated revenue in 2017 was around ₦334 billion (equivalent to US$920 million), growing by 10.43% compared to 2016. By the first half of 2021, the State's internally generated revenue (IGR) alone stood at over ₦267 billion.

=== Lekki Free Trade Zone ===
Lekki Free Trade Zone (Lekki FTZ) is a free zone situated at the eastern part of Lekki, which covers a total area of about 155 square kilometres. The first phase of the zone has an area of 30 square kilometres, with about 27 square kilometres for urban construction purposes, which would accommodate a total resident population of 120,000. According to the Master Plan, the free zone will be developed into a new modern city within a city with integration of industries, commerce and business, real estate development, warehousing and logistics, tourism, and entertainment.

=== Mineral resources ===
The following mineral resources are found in Lagos State:

- Clay
- Bitumen
- Glass Sand
- Crude Oil

== Geography ==
=== Water Borders ===
Lagos State's water boundaries are defined by the Atlantic Ocean to the south and the Lagos Lagoon to the east. The state is also intersected by several rivers and creeks, including the Ogun River, which drains into the Lagoon. Major coastal areas include Victoria Island, Lekki, and Epe. Lagos’ strategic location along the Atlantic Ocean has made it a critical point for trade and commerce, with the Lagos Port Complex and Tin Can Island Port serving as Nigeria's busiest shipping hubs.

=== Climate ===
Under the Köppen climate classification, Lagos State has a tropical monsoon climate (Am), characterized by distinct wet and dry seasons. The rainy season lasts from April to October, with an annual average rainfall of 1,800 to 2,000 mm. Humidity levels remain high throughout the year.

- Dry Season: November to March, characterized by harmattan winds, which bring dry and dusty air from the Sahara Desert.
- Rainy Season: Heavy rainfall and occasional thunderstorms from April to October.

Average daytime temperatures range between 28 °C to 34 °C (82 °F to 93 °F). The highest recorded temperature in Lagos was 38 °C (100 °F), while the lowest was 21 °C (70 °F).

Lagos has a Tropical wet and dry or savanna climate. The city's yearly temperature is 28.67 °C (83.61 °F) and it is -0.79% lower than Nigeria's averages. Lagos typically receives about 132.01 millimetres (5.2 inches) of precipitation and has 193.63 rainy days (53.05% of the time) annually.

=== Drainage ===
Lagos State is characterized by a complex network of lagoons, creeks, and rivers. The Lagos Lagoon serves as the main drainage basin for the state, connected to the Atlantic Ocean through the Commodore Channel. The Ogun River, which originates in Ogun State, flows southward into Lagos Lagoon. The Badagry Creek and the Five Cowrie Creek also contribute to the state's drainage system.

Flooding is a recurring challenge, particularly during the rainy season from April to October, as the low-lying topography and coastal location make Lagos vulnerable to waterlogging and storm surges.

=== Environmental issues ===
- Water Pollution In Lagos, water contamination is a significant issue. Serious health concerns have been raised as a result of the unchecked discharge of raw sewage, sediment-carrying runoff, and effluents into the Lagoon system. People are suffering from deadly waterborne illnesses like cholera and diarrhea as a result. The number of Lagos inhabitants who have access to formal clean water is pitifully small, with most of them reliant on the unofficial sector made up of wells. Lagos has a tropical environment with over 2,000 millimetres (79 inches) of annual rainfall, is surrounded by water, however much of the water is unsafe to drink. The bulk of Lagos inhabitants rely on the unofficial sector, which consists of wells, boreholes, rivers, and rains, as there is very little access to formal clean water.
- Air pollution
- Waste
- Traffic congestion
- Noise pollution

=== Flora and Fauna ===
Lagos State's unique geography supports a wide range of ecosystems, including coastal wetlands, mangrove forests, and lowland tropical rainforests. Species such as mangroves, oil palms, coconut trees, and various species of tropical hardwoods are found in the region. The state's wetlands are home to water plants like water hyacinth and reeds. Lagos’ diverse fauna includes species such as: African bush elephants, antelopes, and African civet cats. Nile crocodiles, monitor lizards, and pythons. The state is home to over 250 species of birds, including the African grey parrot, pied kingfisher, and hammerkop. The Lagos Lagoon and the Atlantic Ocean support a variety of marine life, including tilapia, catfish, crabs, and prawns. Urbanization and pollution have threatened several species, leading to conservation efforts within the state's reserves and protected areas, such as the Lekki Conservation Centre.

=== Parks, Landmarks and Monuments ===
Lagos State has several protected conservation areas aimed at preserving its unique biodiversity:

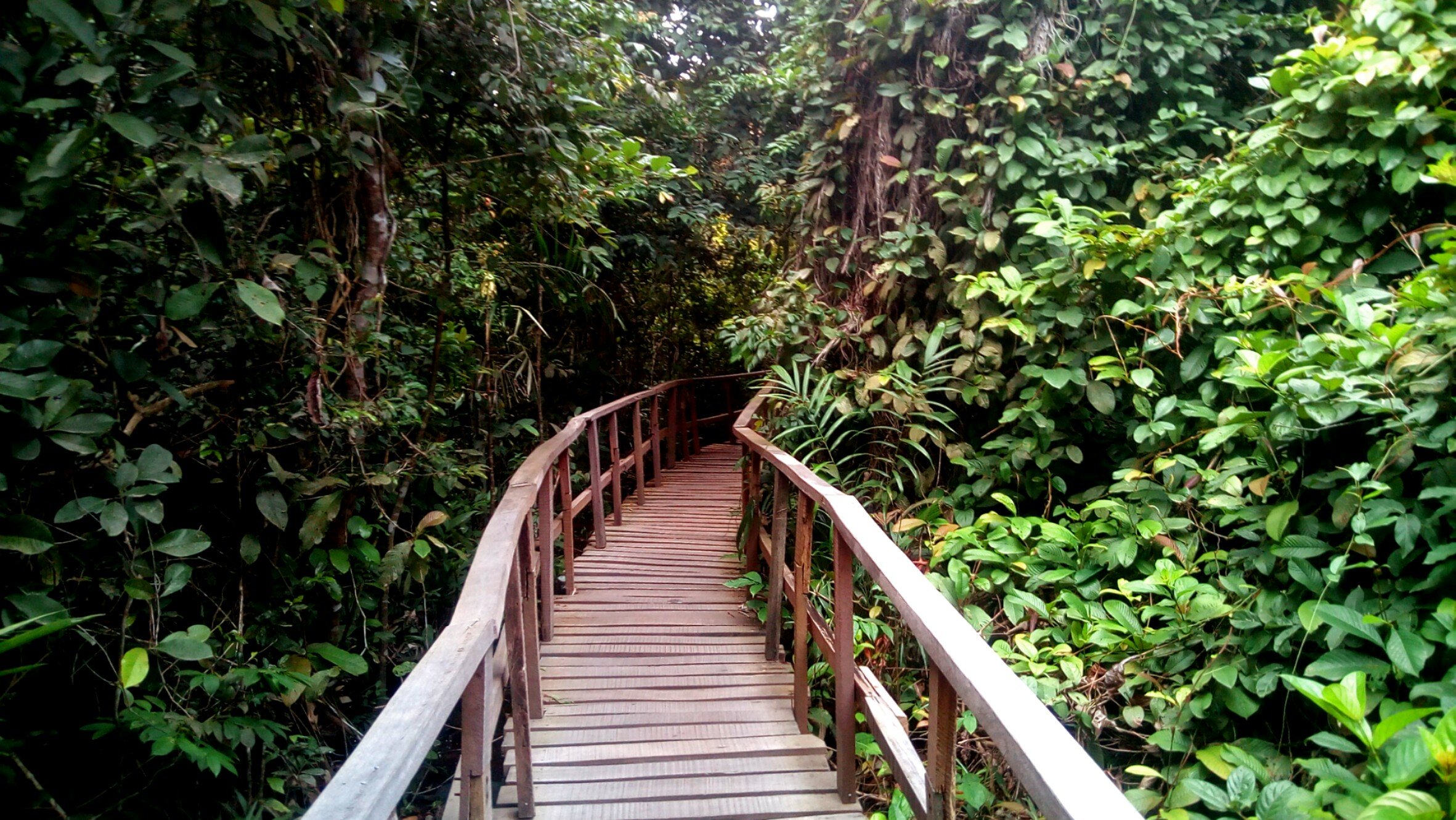

- Lekki Conservation Centre: A 78-hectare (8,400,000 sq ft) reserve with the longest canopy walkway in Africa.
- Lufasi Nature Park: A sanctuary for endangered species and a center for environmental education.
- Omu Resort: A wildlife and amusement park featuring a zoo, aquarium, and other attractions.

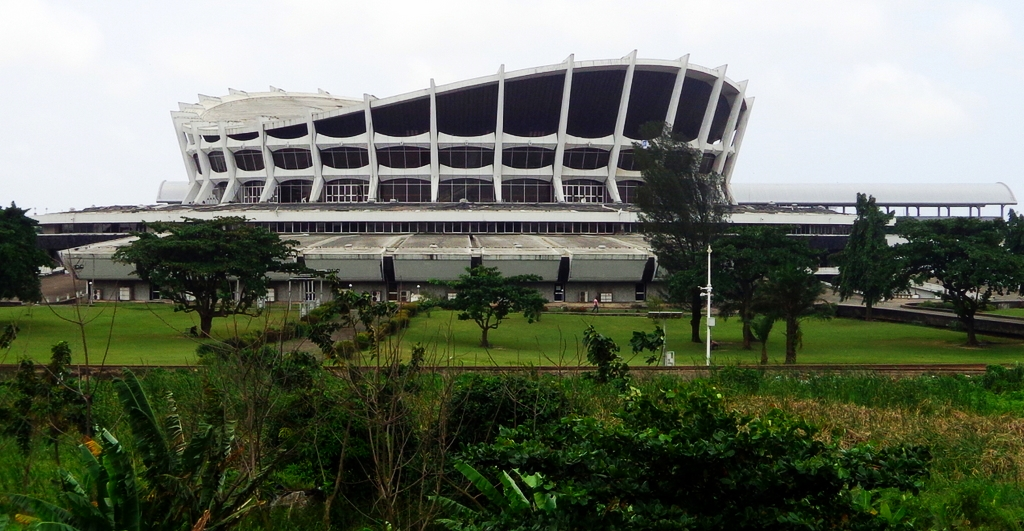

Landmarks and Attractions include;

- First Storey Building in Nigeria: Built in 1845 in Badagry.
- Slave Route: Badagry was a major departure point for enslaved Africans during the transatlantic slave trade.
- National Museum: Houses artifacts, including the famous Festac Mask from the 1977 Festival of African Culture (FESTAC).
- National Theatre: A cultural and arts center in Iganmu.
- Third Mainland Bridge: At 11.8 km, it is the longest bridge in West Africa, connecting Lagos Island to the mainland.
- Nike Art Gallery: The largest art gallery in West Africa, showcasing Nigerian and African art.

Freedom Park: A former colonial-era prison turned into a cultural and recreational center.

== Infrastructure ==
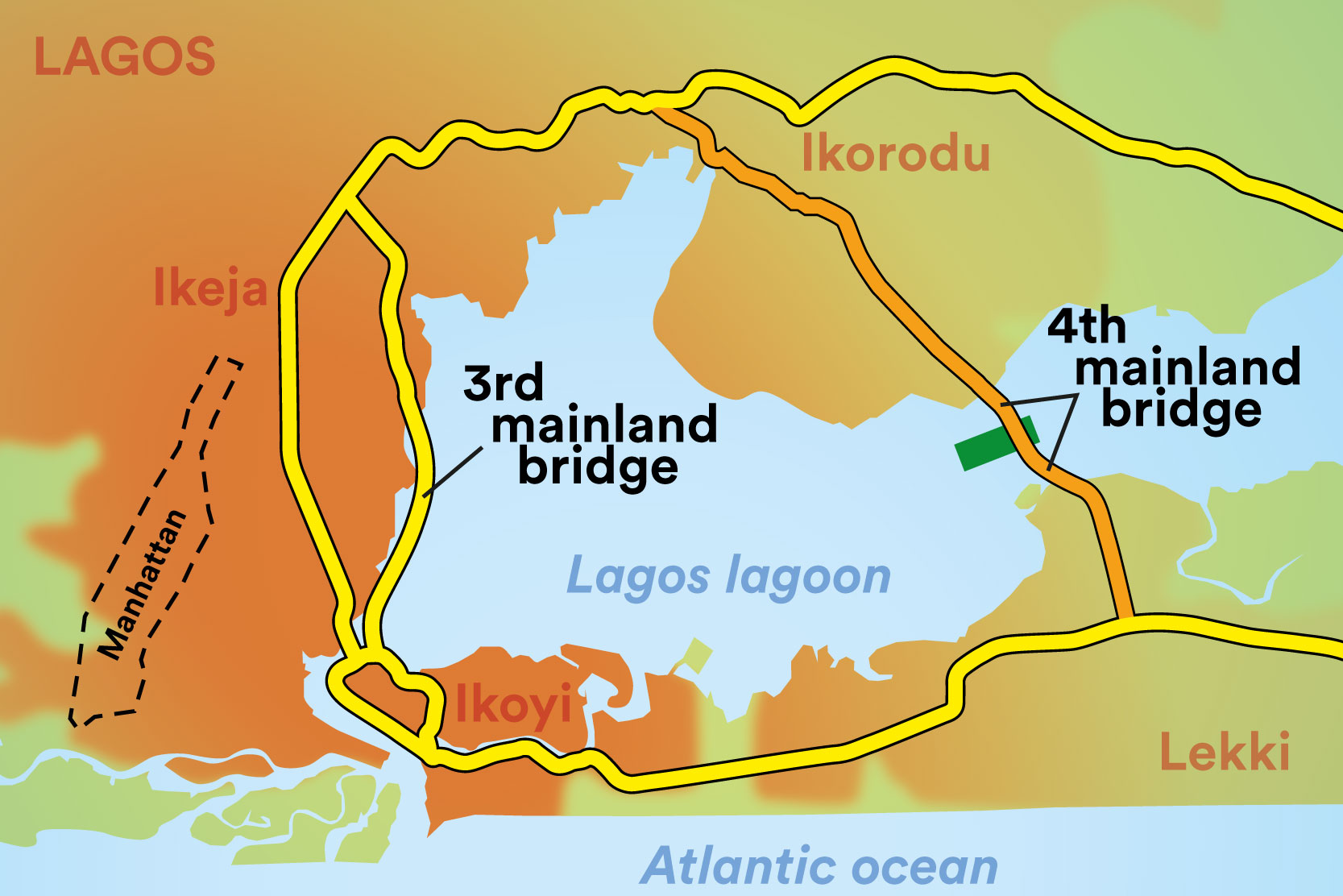
Map of Greater Lagos with bridge, Manhattan as compare

=== Fourth Mainland Bridge ===
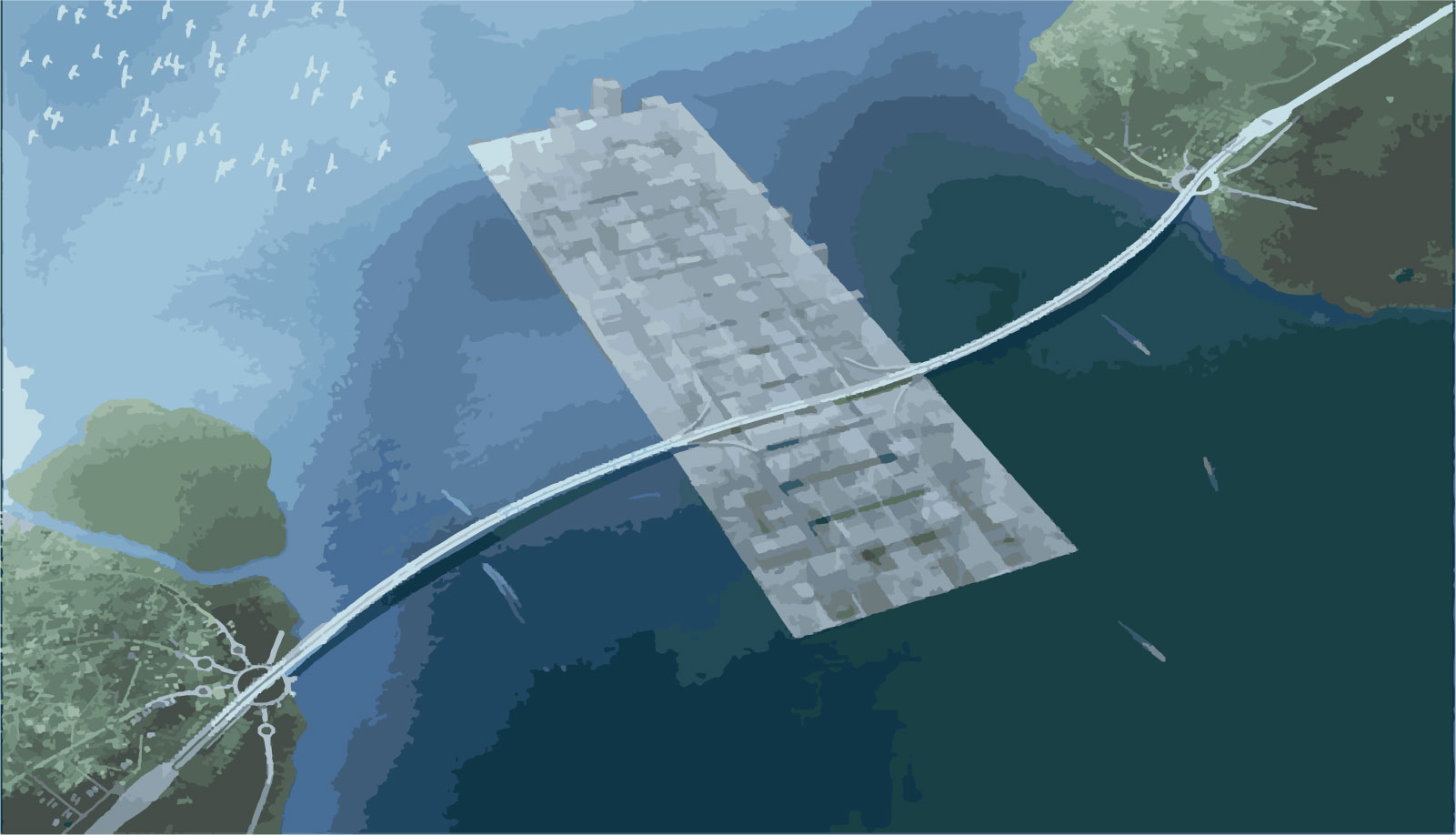
Artificial island with bridge

The Fourth Mainland Bridge is a 38 km long bridge project by the Lagos State Government, connecting Lagos Island by way of Langbasa(Lekki) and Baiyeku(Ikorodu) across the Lagos Lagoon to Itamaga, in Ikorodu. The bridge is a 2 x 4 lane carriageway cross-sectional road with permission for BRT Lane and future road contraction. It is expected to become the second longest bridge in Africa, featuring 3 toll plazas, 9 interchanges, 4.5 km Lagoon Bridge and an eco-friendly environment amongst other added features. In April 2021 there were 6 bidders for the US$2.5 billion project. By December the preferred bidder would be known.

In January 2022 the Lagos State Governor, Babajide Sanwo-Olu, reiterated the plan by the state government to commence the construction on the Opebi-Mende link bridge and the 38-kilometre 4th mainland bridge: "Construction work on the 38km 4th Mainland Bridge — which will be the longest in Africa — and the Opebi-Mende link bridge will commence this year."

=== Transportation ===
==== Transportation by air ====
Murtala Mohammed International Airport in Ikeja is one of Nigeria's five major international airports. It was built in 1978 and named after the former military head of state Late General Murtala Mohammed.

Lagos also has the Lekki-Epe International Airport which is a proposed airport in Lekki, Nigeria, designed for a capacity of 5 million passengers annually.

==== Transportation by land ====
People can commute using by bus using the Lagos Bus Rapid Transit System, also known as Lagos BRT which is regulated by LAMATA.

==== Transportation by rail ====
The Lagos State Rail Mass Transit is an urban rail system which started operation on 4 September 2023.

== Government ==
Since its creation in 1967, the state has been administered either by a governor and a House of Assembly in civilian or quasi-civilian (under Ibrahim Badamasi Babangida's administration) federal administrations, or by Sole-Administrators or Military Administrators in military dispensations. Since December 2007, Yoruba has been the second official language of debate and discussion for the House of Assembly after English. The House of Assembly is headed by the Speaker, an elected position.

== Official Languages of Lagos ==
Both English and Yoruba are the official languages of Lagos state, Yoruba is compulsory for admission into universities and is compulsory in all private and public schools in Lagos State. Yoruba is also used in governmental proceedings as well as in plenaries. Yoruba is also used in very popular newspapers including but not limited to "Alaroye" which means "the explainer" and "Iroyin Owuro" which means "Morning News." These newspapers are distributed across Yorubaland and are available online in order to preserve the Yoruba language as well as close the bridge gap between Yoruba people who cannot understand English well. No longer will people think of Yoruba as inferior to English but Yoruba now will also be seen as an important language, and not as "outdated or old" as some young people now see it . Both English and Yoruba are very important languages in Lagos State. Lagos' laws and rules are available in both Yoruba and English

=== Governor ===
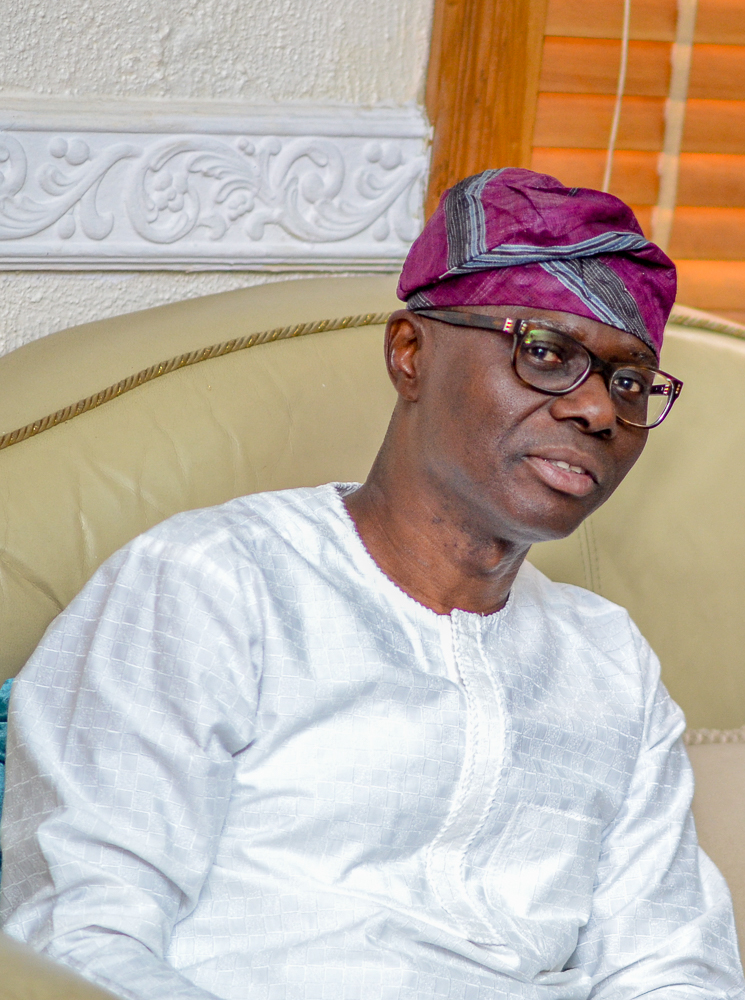
Babajide Olusola Sanwo-Olu, Governor of Lagos State

The current governor of Lagos State is Babajide Sanwo-Olu, who emerged victorious for a second term in office in the March 11, 2023 Governorship elections. Babajide Sanwo-Olu was sworn in on May 29, 2023 for a second term in office, retaining him as the 6th democratic governor of Lagos State and the 15th governor of Lagos State overall. On 18 May 2022, Lagos state government announced total ban on Okada in 6 local government areas of the state.

=== Politics ===
The State government is led by a democratically elected governor who works closely with members of the state's house of assembly. The Capital city of the State is Ikeja.

== Electoral System ==
The electoral system of each state is selected using a modified two-round system. To be elected in the first round, a candidate must receive the plurality of the vote and over 25% of the vote in at least two -third of the State local government Areas. If no candidate passes threshold, a second round will be held between the top candidate and the next candidate to have received a plurality of votes in the highest number of local government areas.

== Administrative divisions ==
=== Local Government Areas ===
Lagos State is divided into five administrative divisions, which are further divided into 20 local government areas, or LGAs. They are listed below with their populations as at the 2006 Census and as estimated for 21 March 2022 by the National Population Commission of Nigeria (web) and National Bureau of Statistics (web):

LGA name	Area (km^{2})	Census 2006 population	Estimate March 2022	Administrative capital	Postal code
Agege	12.25	461,743	683,600	Agege	100
Alimosho	183.50	1,319,571	1,953,500	Ikotun	100
Ifako-Ijaye	32.21	427,737	633,200	Ifako	100
Ikeja	42.31	317,614	470,200	Ikeja	100
Kosofe	59.99	682,772	1,010,800	Kosofe	100
Mushin	17.01	631,857	935,400	Mushin	100
Oshodi-Isolo	54.04	629,061	931,300	Oshodi/Isolo	100
Shomolu	10.30	403,569	597,400	Shomolu	101
Ikeja Division	411.61	4,873,924	7,215,400		
Apapa	40.40	222,986	330,100	Apapa	101
Eti-Osa	174.90	283,791	420,100	Ikoyi	101
Lagos Island	5.05	212,700	314,900	Lagos Island	101
Lagos Mainland	20.18	326,700	483,600	Lagos Mainland	101
Surulere	20.01	502,865	744,400	Surulere	101
Lagos Division	260.54	1,549,042	2,293,100		
Ajeromi-Ifelodun	12.49	687,316	1,017,500	Ajeromi/Ifelodun	102
Amuwo-Odofin	114.20	328,975	487,000	Festac Town	102
Ojo	172.70	609,173	901,800	Ojo	102
Badagry	445.60	237,731	351,900	Badagry	103
Badagry Division	744.99	1,863,195	2,758,200		
Ikorodu	411.30	527,917	781,500	Ikorodu	104
Ikorodu Division	411.30	527,917	781,500		
Ibeju-Lekki	415.90	117,793	174,400	Akodo	105
Epe	1,315.00	181,734	269,000	Epe	106
Epe Division	1,730.90	299,527	443,400		
Total	3,559.34	9,113,605	13,491,800	Ikeja	

The first 16 of the above LGAs comprise the statistical area of Metropolitan Lagos, with 11,915,000 inhabitants in March 2022. The remaining four LGAs (Badagry, Ikorodu, Ibeju-Lekki and Epe) are within Lagos State but are not part of Metropolitan Lagos.

=== Local council development areas ===
In 2003, many of the existing 20 LGAs were split for administrative purposes into Local Council Development Areas. These lower-tier administrative units now number 56: Agbado/Oke-Odo, Agboyi/Ketu, Agege, Ajeromi, Alimosho, Apapa, Apapa-Iganmu, Ayobo/Ipaja, Badagry West, Badagry, Bariga, Coker Aguda, Egbe Idimu, Ejigbo, Epe, Eredo, Eti-Osa East, Eti Osa West, Iba, Isolo, Imota, Ikoyi, Ibeju, Ifako-Ijaiye, Ifelodun, Igando/Ikotun, Igbogbo/Bayeku, Ijede, Ikeja, Ikorodu North, Ikorodu West, Ikosi Ejinrin, Ikorodu, Ikorodu West, Iru/Victoria Island, Itire Ikate, Kosofe, Lagos Island West, Lagos Island East, Lagos Mainland, Lekki, Mosan/Okunola, Mushin, Odi Olowo/Ojuwoye, Ojo, Ojodu, Ojokoro, Olorunda, Onigbongbo, Oriade, Orile Agege, Oshodi, Oto-Awori, Shomolu, Surulere and Yaba.

=== Electoral wards ===
Below is a list of polling units, including villages and schools, organised by electoral ward.

LGA	Wards
Agege	Isale/Idimangoro; Iloro/Onipetesi; Oniwaya/Papa-Uku; Agbotikuyo/Dopemu; Oyewole/Papa Ashafa; Okekoto; Keke; Darocha; Tabon Tabon/Oko Oba; Orile Agege/Oko Oba; Isale Odo
Ajeromi/Ifelodun	Ago Hausa; Awodi-Ora; Wilmer; Olodi; Tolu; Temidire I; Ojo Road; Layeni; Alaba Oro; Mosafejo; Temidire II
Alimosho	Shasha/Akowonjo; Egbeda/Alimosho; Idimu/Isheri Olofin; Akesan; Ikotun/Ijegun; Egbe/Agodo; Igando/Egan; Ipaja North; Ipaja South; Ayobo/Ijon Village (Camp David); Pleasure/Oke-Odo; Abule-Egba/Aboru/Meiran/Alagbado
Amuwo-Odofin	Amuwo-Odofin Housing Estate, Mile 2; Festac 1; Festac II; Kirikiri; Amuwo; Ijegun; Satellite; Irede; Ibeshe; Igbologun; Festac III
Apapa	Apapa I (Marine Rd. and environs); Apapa II (Liverpool Rd. and environs); Apapa III (Creek Rd. Tincan/Snake Island; Apapa IV (Pelewura Crescent and environs); Ijora-Oloye; Olodan St. Olojowou St/Alh. Dogo Olatokunbo St. Iganmu; Gaskiya & environs; Afolabi Alasia Str. and environs; Malu Road and environs; Sari and environs
Badagry	Posukoh; Awhanjigoh; Ibereko; Keta-East; Iworo Gbanko; Ajido; Ilogbo-Araromi; Ikoga; Ajara; Iya-Afin
Epe	Etita/Ebode; Lagbade; Popo-Oba; Oke-Balogun; Ajaganabe; Ise/Igbogun; Oriba/Ladaba; Abomiti; Agbowa; Agbowa Ikosi; Ago Owu; Orugbo; Ilara; Ibonwon; Odoragunsin; Poka; Odomola; Ejirin; Itoikin
Eti-Osa	Victoria Island I; Victoria Island II; Ilasan Housing Estate; Lekki/Ikate and environs; Ilado/Eti-Osa and environs; Ajah/Sangotedo; Ado/Langbasa/Badore; Ikoyi I; Ikoyi II; Obalende
Ibeju/Lekki	Ibeju I; N2, (Ibeju II); Orimedu I; 02, (Orimedu II); 03, (Orimedu III); P1, (Iwerekun I); Iwerekun II; S1, (Lekki I); Lekki II; S2, (Siriwon/Igbekodo I); S,2a (Siriwon/Igbekodo II)
Ifako-Ijaye	Ijaye; Old Ifako/Karaole; New Ifako/Oyemekun; Fagba/Akute Road; Iju Isaga; Iju-Obawole; Pamada/Abule-Egba; Ijaiye/Ojokoro; Ijaiye/Agbado/Kollington; Alakuko/Kollington; Ajegunle/Akinde/Animashaun
Ikeja	Anifowoshe/Ikeja; Ojodu/Agidingbi/Omole; Alausa/Oregun/Olusosun; Airport/Onipetesi/Onilekere; Ipodo/Seriki Aro; Adekunle Vill./Adeniyi Jones/Ogba; Oke-Ira/Aguda; Onigbongbo/Military Cantonment; Gra/Police Barracks; Wasimi/Opebi/Allen
Ikorodu	Isele I; Isele II; Isele III; Aga/Ijimu; Ipakodo; Imota 1; Imota II; Isiu; Igbogbo I; Igbogbo II; Baiyeku/Oreta; Ijede J; Ijede II; Agura/Iponmi; Odogunyan; Erikorodu; Agbala; Olorunda/Igbaga
Kosofe	Oworonshoki; Ifako/Soluyi; Anthony/Ajao Estate/Mende/Maryland; Ojota/Ogudu; Ketu/Alapere/Agidi/Orisigun/Kosofe/Ajelogo/Akanimodo; Ikosi Ketu/Mile 12/Agiliti/Maidan; Isheri-Olowo-Ira/Shangisha/Magodo Phase I & II; Agboyi I; Agboyi II; Owode Onirin/Ajegunle/Odo-Ogun
Lagos Island	Olowogbowo/Elegbata; Oluwole; Idumota/Oke; Oju-Oto; Oko-Awo; Agarawu/Obadina; Iduntafa; Ilupesi; Isale-Agbede; Olosun; Olushi/Kakawa; Popo-Aguda; Anikantamo; Oko-Faji; Eiyekole; Onikan; Sandgrouse; Epetedo; Lafiaji/Ebute
Lagos Mainland	Otto/Iddo; Olaleye Village; Maroko/Ebute Metta; Oyingbo Market/Ebute Metta; Glover/Ebute Metta; Oko-Baba; Oyadiran Estate/Abule-Oja; Alagomeji; Iwaya; Yaba/Igbobi
Mushin	Alakara; Idi-Oro/Odi-Olowu; Babalosa; Ojuwoye; Ilupeju; Olateju; Kayode/Fadeyi; Mushin/Atewolara; Papa-Ajao; Ilasamaja; Babalosa/Idi-Araba; Idi-Araba; Itire; Ilupeju Industrial Estate
Ojo	Ojo Town; Okokomaiko; Ajangbadi; Ijanikin; Iba; Irewe; Tafi; Etegbin; Idoluwo; Sabo, Ojo barracks
Oshodi/Isolo	Oshodi/Bolade; Orile-Oshodi; Isolo; Ajao Estate; Mafoluku; Sogunle; Sogunle/Alasia; Okota; Ishagatedo; Oke-Afa/Ejigbo
Somolu	Onipanu; Palmgrove/Ijebutedo; Alade; Bajulaiye; Mafowoku/Pedro; Lad-Lak/Bariga; Ilaje/Akoka; Igbobi/Fadeyi; Fola Agoro/Bajulaiye/Igbari-Akoka; Gbagada Phase I Obanikoro/Pedro; Gbagada Phase II /Bariga/Apelehin; Abule-Okuta/Ilaje/Bariga
Surulere	Orile; Aguda; Ijeshatedo; Akinhanmi/Cole; Yaba/Ojuelegba; Igbaja/Stadium; Shitta/Ogunlana Drive; Adeniran/Ogunsanya; Iponri Housing Estate/Eric Moore; Coker; Ikate; Baya-Oje; Igbon/Gambari; Iresaapa; Arolu; Iresaadu; Iregba; Iwofin; Ilajue; Mayin

== Educational institutions ==
=== Universities ===
- Anchor University
- Augustine University Ilara, Epe
- Caleb University
- CETEP City University
- Lagos State University (including Lagos State University College of Medicine)
- Lagos State University of Education
- Lagos State University of Science and Technology
- National Open University of Nigeria, Lagos study centres
- Pan Atlantic University (including Lagos Business School)
- University of Lagos

=== Polytechinics & Monotechnics ===
- Federal College of Fisheries and Marine Technology
- Lagos City Polytechnic
- Lagos State College of Health Technology
- Nigerian Institute of Journalism, Ogba
- Yaba College of Technology

=== Colleges of Education ===
- Federal College of Education, Akoka
- Michael Otedola College of Primary Education
- Adeniran Ogunsanya College of Education upgraded in 2022 now Lagos State University of Education

== Tourism ==
Lagos State has over 700 km of Atlantic sandy beaches with about 20 between the west of Badagry and east of Lekki. Along with these, there are several tourist attractions. They include:

- Atlas Cove, Apapa
- Bar Beach, Victoria Island
- Elegushi Beach
- Tarkwa Bay Beach
- Topo Island, Badagry.
- King Ado statue, Lagos Island
- Tafawa Balewa Square

Giwa Gardens in the Sangotedo district is a water park that claims to be the largest in West Africa.

== Demographics ==
Lagos state is in Yorubaland and the Yoruba language is predominant. The state attracts other non-Yorubas who live there in search of greener pastures attracting both Nigerians and foreigners alike.

Indigenous inhabitants include the Awori and Ogu a.k.a. Egun in the Ikeja and Badagry Divisions respectively, with the Egun being found mainly in Badagry.

There is also an admixture of other pioneer settlers collectively known as the Eko.

The Alimosho and Ifako-Ijaiye Local Government areas are predominantly populated by the Egba and Egbado Yoruba people. The area is rich in culture, prominent amongst which are the Oro, Igunnu and Egungun annual festivals.

The indigenous people of the Ikorodu and Epe Divisions are mainly the Ijebu, with pockets of Eko-Awori settlers along the coastland and riverine areas.

== Religion ==
The dominant religions in Lagos State are Christianity and Islam although a certain amount of traditional religion is still practiced. Churches represented include Anglican, Baptist, Methodist, 25.6% Roman Catholic, and many local and spiritual churches. Islam and traditional Yoruba spiritism are also practised.

The Anglican Province of Lagos (2002) within the Church of Nigeria includes the four Dioceses of Lagos (1919) led by Bishop Humphrey Bamisebi Olumakaiye until he died 2022, Badagry led by Bishop Babatunde Joseph Adeyemi (2005), Lagos Mainland led by Bishop Akinpelu Johnson (2014) and Lagos West (1999) with 275 parishes led by Bishop James Olusola Odedeji (2013).

343,675 Catholics (2021) in Archdiocese of Lagos (1860 as the Vicariate Apostolic of Dahomey) with 184 parishes under Archbishop Alfred Adewale Martins (2012).

== Notable people ==
- Femi Ojo Ade, writer
- Kemi Adetiba, film maker
- Jimi Agbaje, politician
- Henry Ajomale, politician
- Rilwan Akiolu, Oba of Lagos
- Akinwunmi Ambode, accountant and politician
- Miyonse Amosu, chef and media personality
- Josy Anne, media personality
- Ayodele Awojobi, academic
- Segun Awosanya, advocate
- Muiz Banire, lawyer
- Basketmouth, comedian
- Paul Boroh (born 1958), politician and retired Nigerian Army brigadier general
- Henry Rawlingson Carr, educator
- G. B. A. Coker, former Judge of Supreme Court Of Nigeria
- F. C. O. Coker, first Nigerian Municipal Treasurer, former secretary to the Lagos State Government and the first president of ICAN
- Lanre Towry-Coker, Nigerian Architect, politician
- Davido, musician
- Candido Da Rocha (1860–1959) – Nigerian businessman
- T. A. Doherty (1895–1974) Founding of the Nigerian Stock Exchange & the National Bank of Nigeria. Businessman, Politician & Lawyer.
- Tony Elumelu, businessman
- Falz, singer
- Babatunde Fashola, politician
- Femi Gbajabiamila, politician
- Bode George, politician
- Ronke Giwa-Onafuwa, radio presenter
- Adekunle Gold, singer
- Amy Jadesimi, businesswoman
- Oladipo Jadesimi, businessman
- Lateef Jakande, politician
- Mobolaji Johnson, First governor, Lagos State.
- TB Joshua, Christian minister
- Fela Kuti, musician
- Omogie Ojei, visual artist and poet
- Mr Macaroni, comedian
- Herbert Macaulay, nationalist
- Musiliu Obanikoro, politician
- Hakeem Olajuwon, basketball player
- Babatunde Olatunji, musician
- Omos, professional wrestler
- Bruce Onobrakpeya, artist
- Oba Otudeko, businessman
- Jim Ovia, businessman
- Rahman Owokoniran, politician
- Christopher Sapara Williams, (1855–1915) first indigenous Nigerian Lawyer
- Babajide Sanwo-Olu, state Governor
- Toyin Saraki, healthcare philanthropist
- Wole Soyinka, writer
- Bola Tinubu, politician
- Efunroye Tinubu, aristocrat
- Remi Tinubu, politician
- Banky W., entertainer and politician
- Akintola Williams, (1919–2023) First Nigerian to qualify as a chartered accountant. Founding of the Nigerian Stock Exchange.
- Funsho Williams, politician
- Wizkid, musician

== See also ==
- List of government ministries of Lagos State
