= Lekki (disambiguation) =

Lekki is a city in Lagos State, Nigeria.

Lekki may also refer to:

- Lekki Lagoon, in Lagos and Ogun states, Nigeria
- Port at Lekki, the seaport of Lekki, Lagos State, Nigeria
- Ibeju-Lekki, a local government area in Eti-Osa, Lagos State, Nigeria
