= Eti-Osa =

- LGA
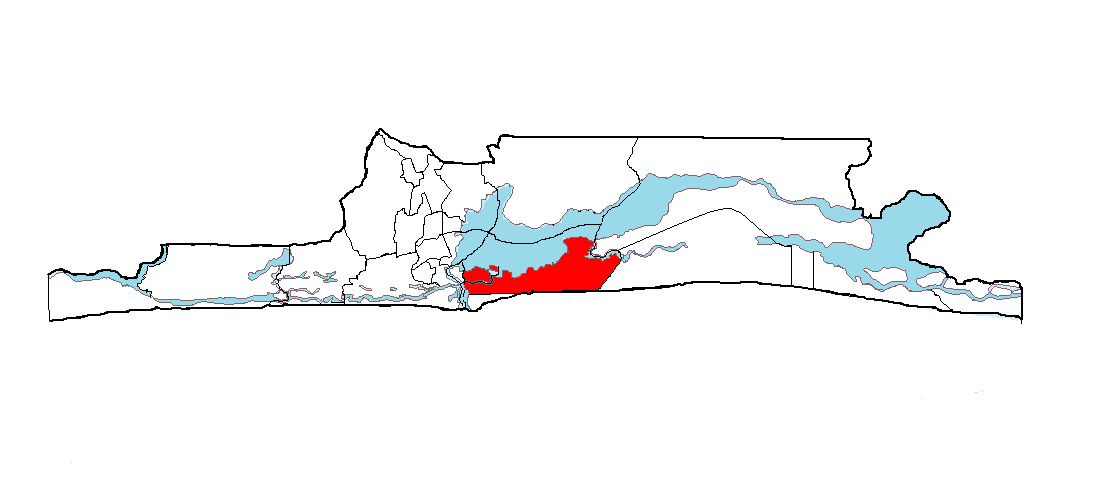
- Eti-Osa shown within the State of Lagos
- Interactive map of Eti-Osa
- Country: Nigeria
- State: Lagos State
- Principal cities: Lagos (Note: Ikoyi-Obalande LCDA and Iru Victoria Island LCDA); Lekki (Note: Eti-Osa East LCDA)
- Headquarter: Ikoyi

Government
  - Chairman: Shuaibu Ajayi

Population (2006)
  - Total: 287,785
- Time zone: UTC+1 (WAT)

Eti-Osa is a Local Government Area of Lagos State in Nigeria. Lagos State Government administers the council area as Ikoyi-Obalende LCDA, Eti-Osa East, and Iru Victoria Island LCDA. Within Eti-Osa are several important areas of Lagos State, including Lagos' Victoria Island. Before the Nigerian Capital moved to Abuja, Eti-Osa Local Government Area served alongside Lagos Island Local Government Area as the seat of the national capital. Eti-osa used to be the poorest neighborhood in Lagos State until development changed it to become one of the most prosperous areas where the richest Nigerians live in Lagos. Currently, Babajide Sanwo Olu is the governor of Lagos State and responsible for the local governments setup and delivering government services to the people.

== Population ==
Eti-Osa Local Government Area has a population of 283,791, which represents 3.11% of the state's population. 158,858 of the total population are male while the remaining 124,933 are female.

== Geography of Eti-Osa ==
The local government area has two normal seasons which are dry and rainy seasons. The temperature of the area is 25 °C (77 °F) with wind blowing at an average of 13 km/h.

== Demographic ==
The people of Eti-Osa are predominantly from the Awori Yoruba and Ijebu Yoruba. However, like most parts of Lagos State, it is currently home to a diverse mix of ethnicities from different states of the country. The population including people from Hausa, Igbo and other tribes.

== Business and industry ==
There are fewer industries within Eti-Osa. Most residents work in fishing, farming, and trading. However, being the former location of the nation's capital, Eti-Osa is home to many large domestic and international businesses. Eti-Osa is a commercial area that has several public and private institutions with Banks, hotels, clubs and modern markets where the exchange of good and services take place. In 2009, Eti-Osa was placed under study for commercial horticultural practices in Nigeria, where it was discovered that it had 75 gardens that were concentrated in Ikoyi and Victoria Island.

== Politics and elections in Eti-Osa ==
On 25 February 2023, Nigeria had its presidential and Federal Legislative election. In Eti-Osa Local Government Area of Lagos, the Labour Party (LP) candidate, Mr. Thaddeus Attah was declared the winner by INEC Returning Officer to represent the Federal Constituency Seat. However, the result generated contests as the Party agents from APC and PDP rejected it over the claim that some people were disenfranchised from voting in Eti-Osa. In the process, the police and the army were brought to maintain peace and order in the local government area.

== Neighbourhoods ==
- Ikoyi
- Lekki
- Port at Lekki
- Victoria Island
- Maroko (since demolished)

== Education ==
Educational institutions in Eti Osa LGA include both local and international schools, institutions and organisations. The local institutions consist of colleges of education, education research centres, secondary schools, training organisation and consultants and a university among others.

Some of the international schools include:

- British International School Lagos (Victoria Island)
- Lycée Français Louis Pasteur de Lagos (Victoria Island)
- Lekki British School (Lekki Peninsula)
- American International School of Lagos (1004 Estate Victoria Island)

== Important places in Eti-Osa ==
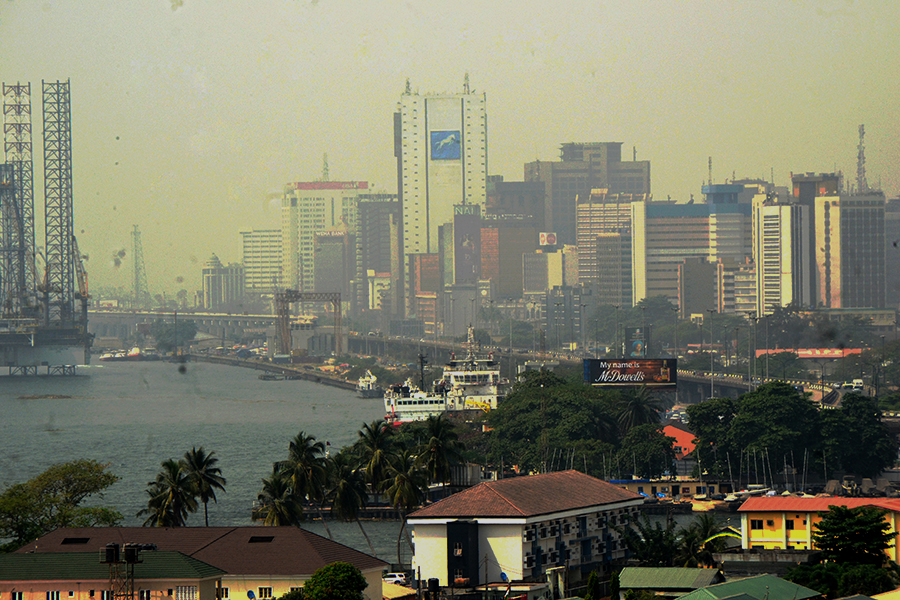
Top view of commercial areas in victoria island, Lagos

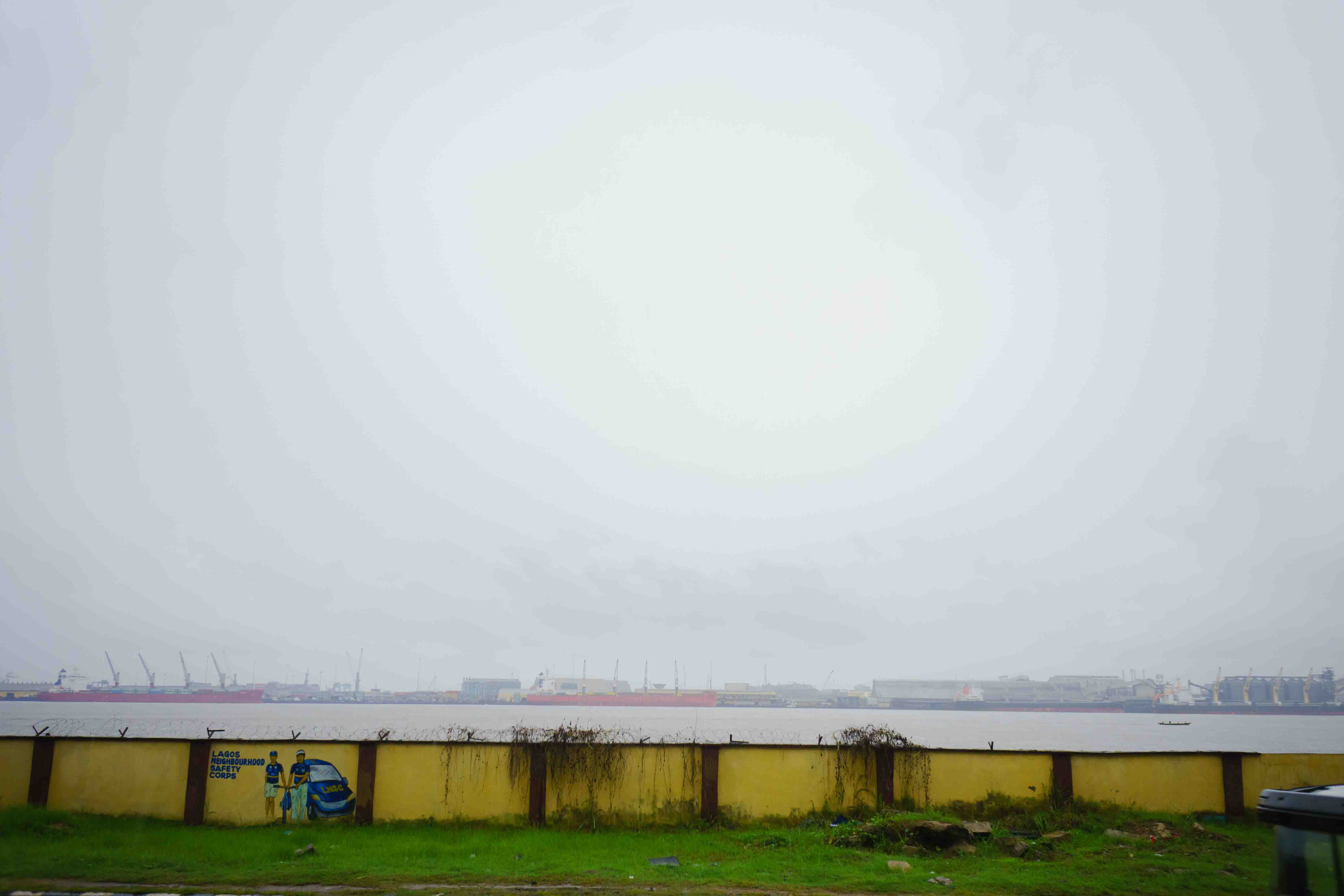
Water shore CMS Outer Marina road leading to Victoria Island, Ikoyi, Lagos, Nigeria

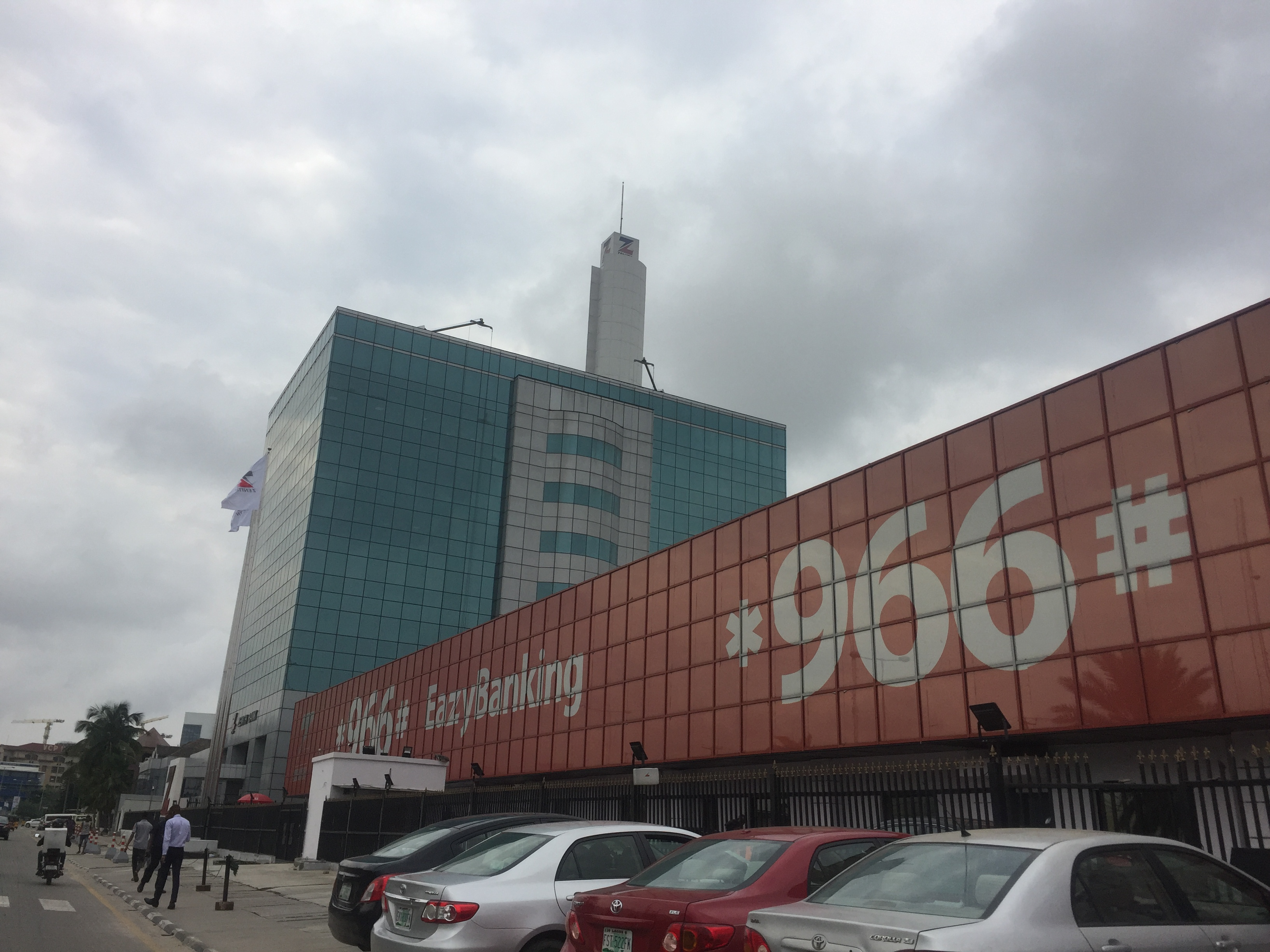
Zenith bank headquarters, Victoria Island, Lagos

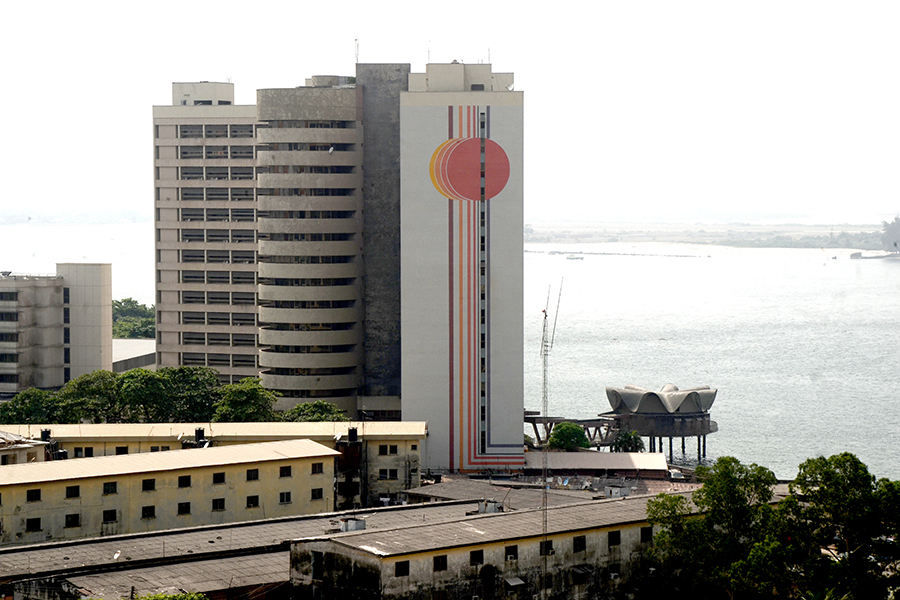
EKO hospital Victoria Island, Lagos

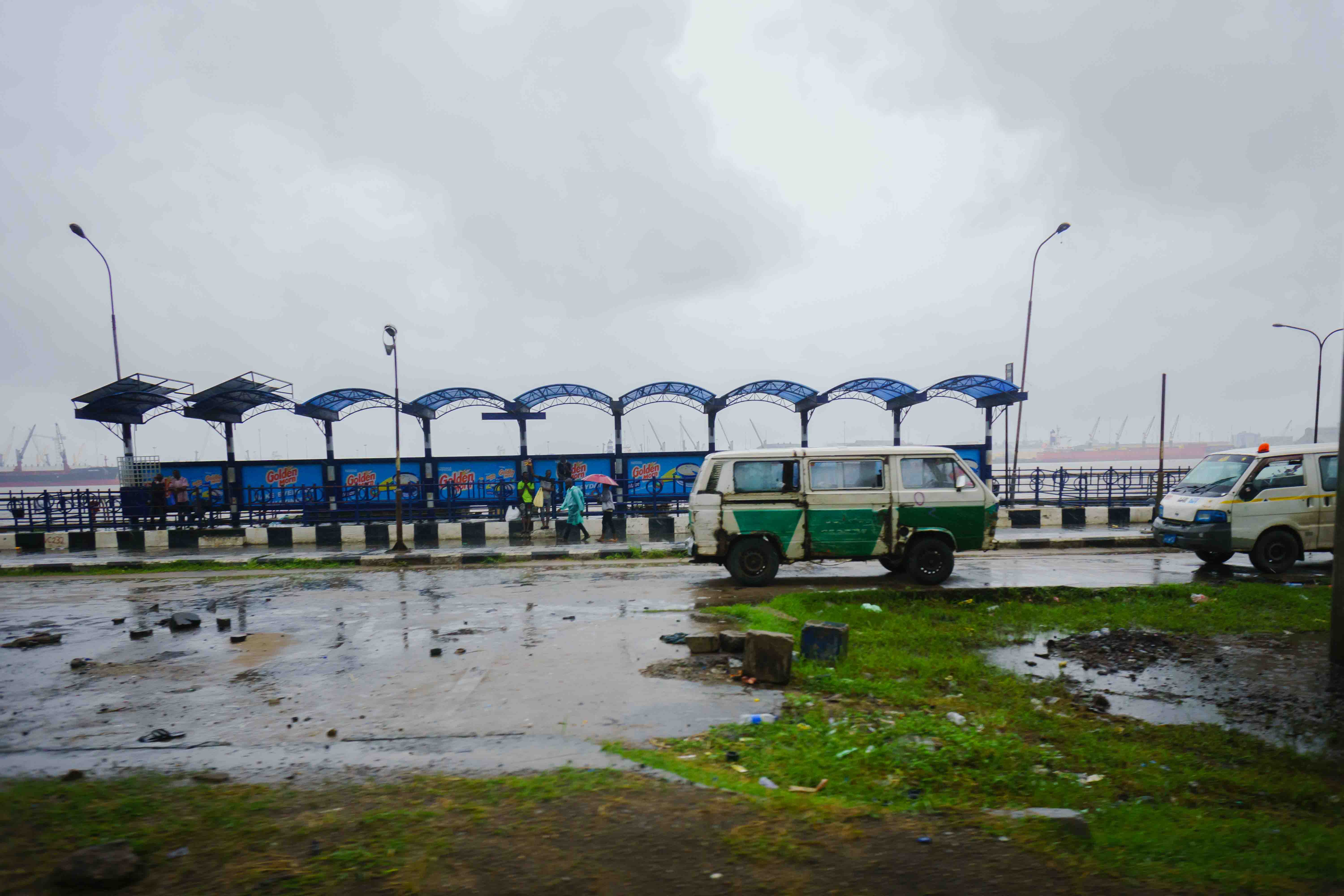
BRT bus shed at CMS Outer Marina road leading to Victoria Island, Ikoyi, Lagos, Nigeria

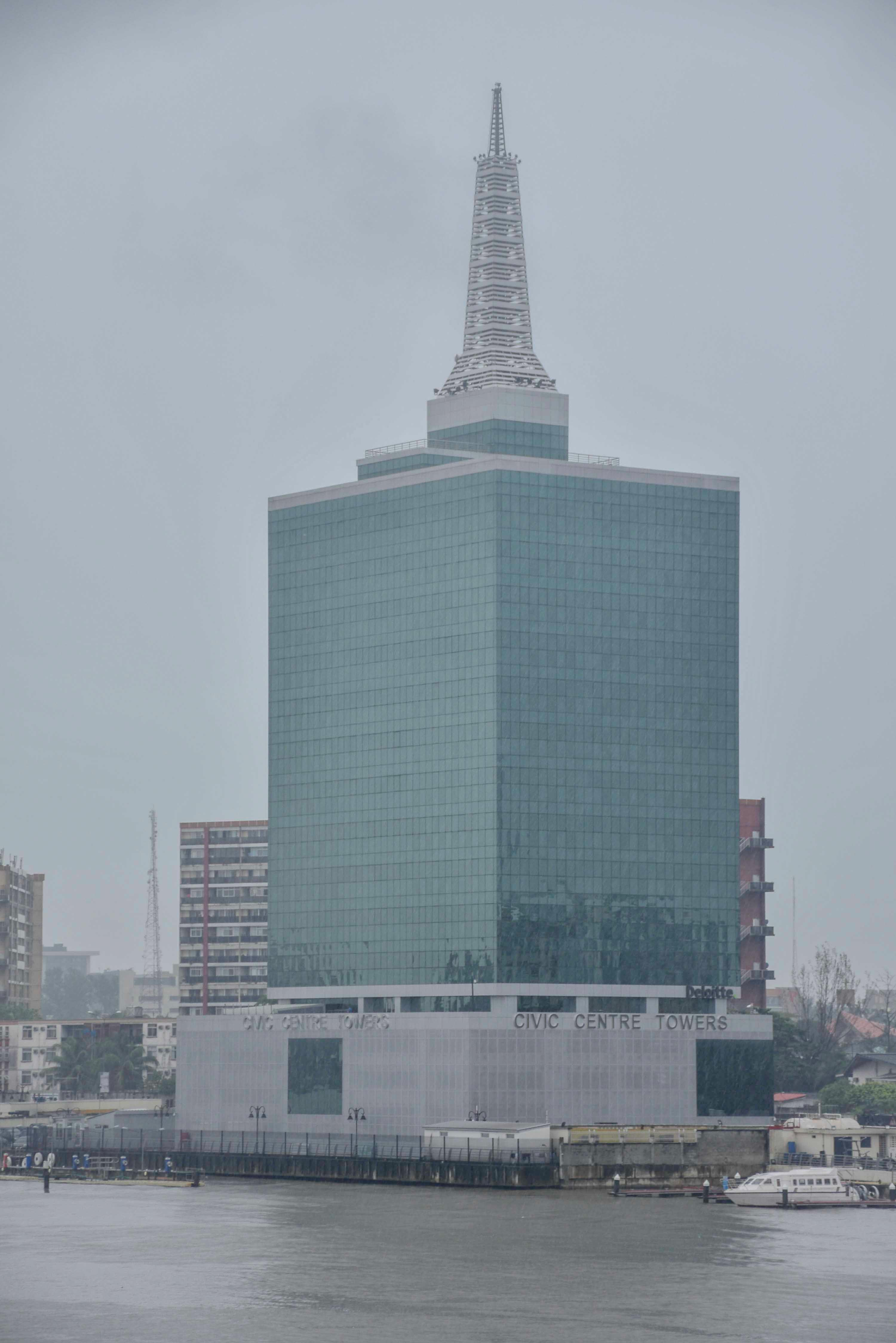
Civic Towers, Ozumba Mbadiwe, Victoria Island, Lagos
