= Oladipo Olayinka Ajomale =

Nigerian politician

Hon. Oladipo Olayinka Ajomale

Member, Lagos State House of Assembly
- Incumbent
- Assumed office 2023
- Constituency: Oshodi-Isolo Constituency II

Personal details
- Party: All Progressives Congress (APC)
- Parent: Henry Ajomale (father)
- Education: Lagos State University (LLB) Nigerian Law School (BL)
- Occupation: Lawyer, Politician
- Website: Lagos Assembly Profile

Oladipo Olayinka Ajomale (also known as Ladi Ajomale) is a Nigerian lawyer and politician who currently serves as a member of the Lagos State House of Assembly, representing Oshodi-Isolo Constituency II under the platform of the All Progressives Congress (APC). He is the Chairman of the House Committee on Judiciary, Human Rights, Public Petitions, and LASIEC.

== Early life and education ==
Oladipo Ajomale is the son of Chief Henry Oladele Ajomale, a prominent politician and former Chairman of the Lagos State chapter of the All Progressives Congress (APC).

He began his secondary education at St. Gregory's College, Ikoyi, and later attended the Lagos State Model College, Kankon, Badagry, for his Senior Secondary Certificate Examination (SSCE). He proceeded to Lagos State University (LASU), where he obtained a Bachelor of Laws (LL.B) degree. He subsequently attended the Nigerian Law School and was called to the Nigerian Bar.

== Career ==
=== Legal and public service ===
Before entering the state legislature, Ajomale worked in the legal profession and public administration. He practiced at Proteus Law Firm and served in the Civil and Criminal Litigation departments of the Lagos State Ministry of Justice.

He also served in the executive arm of government as a Special Assistant on Administration, Strategy, and Political Affairs to the Deputy Governor of Lagos State. Additionally, he served as a Commissioner in the Lagos State Local Government Service Commission, where he was involved in setting guidelines for the appointment and promotion of local government employees.

=== Political career ===
In May 2022, Ajomale won the APC primary ticket for the Oshodi-Isolo Constituency II seat, defeating the incumbent lawmaker, Jude Idimogu. He went on to win the general election in 2023.

Upon his inauguration into the 10th Assembly, he was appointed Chairman of the House Committee on Judiciary, Human Rights, Public Petitions, and the Lagos State Independent Electoral Commission (LASIEC). In this capacity, he oversees judicial matters and addresses public petitions brought before the House.
