= Lagos Lagoon =

- Ọ̀sà
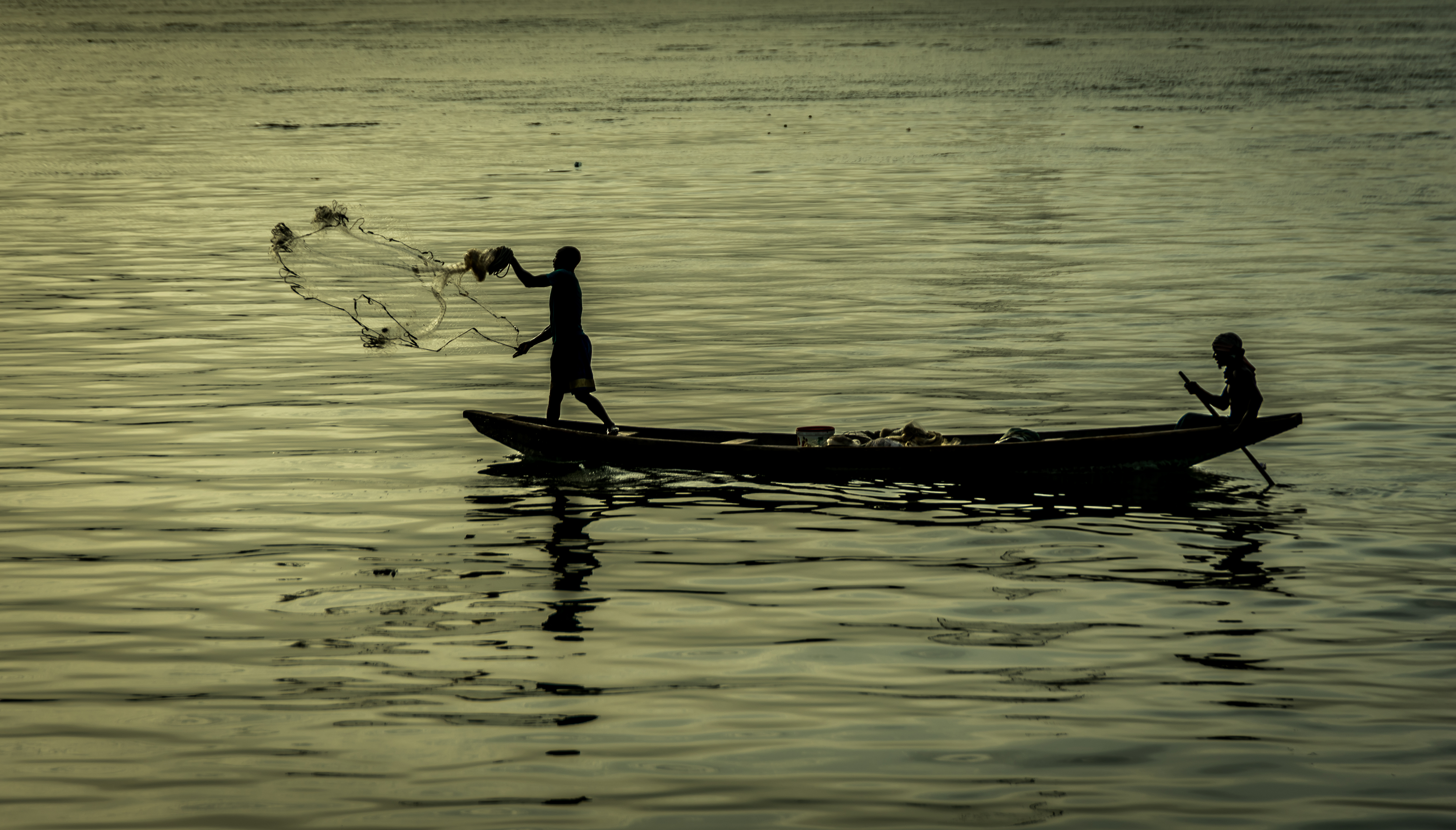
- Fishing on Lagos Lagoon, Nigeria.

- Location within Nigeria
- Location: Lagos State, Nigeria
- Coordinates: 6.5015814°N 3.5224915°E
- Type: lagoon
- Basin countries: Nigeria
- Max. length: 50 km (31 mi)
- Max. width: 13 km (8.1 mi)
- Surface area: 6,354.7 km^{2} (2,453.6 sq mi)
- Surface elevation: 0 m (0 ft)
- Islands: Lagos Island, Victoria Island
- Settlements: Lagos, Ikorodu

Lagos Lagoon (Yoruba: Ọ̀sà) is a lagoon found in the city of Lagos, southwest Nigeria, the most populous city in Africa. The name Lagos means 'lakes' in Portuguese, therefore Lagos Lagoon is an example of a tautological place name. The lagoon lies between the Atlantic Ocean and Lagos State. It is one of the ten lagoons in Lagos State and the largest in the Gulf of Guinea which spans over 6,000 square kilometres (2,300 sq mi).

The lagoon is a habitat for different aquatic organisms, such as various species of fish that are sources of income and food for communities surrounding it.

== Physical characteristics ==
The lagoon is more than 50 km long and 3–13 km wide, separated from the Atlantic Ocean by a long sand spit 2–5 km long. Its surface area is approximately 6,354.7 km². The lagoon is fairly shallow and is not plied by ocean-going ships, but by smaller barges and boats. It receives the discharge of the Ogun River and the Osun River.

The sediments of the lagoon ranges from mangrove swamp to muddy and sandy foreshores.

== Geography ==
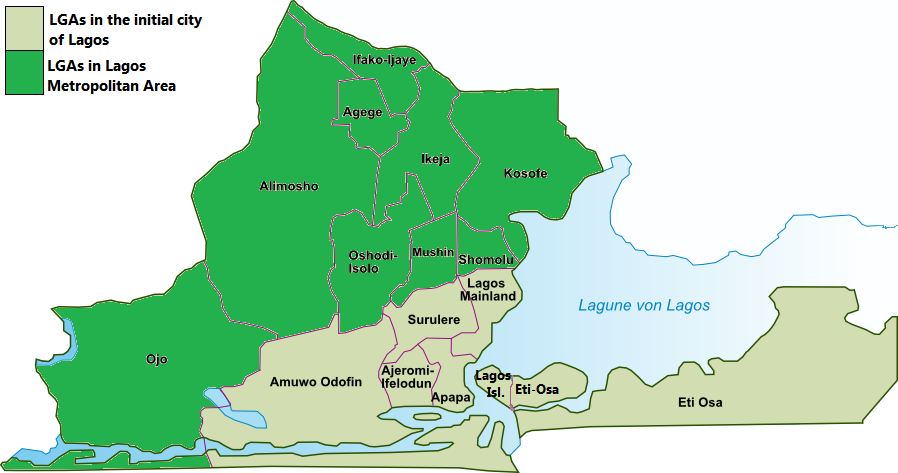
Map showing relative position of Lagos Lagoon to urban areas, harbour and port areas of Lagos Metropolitan Area

Lagos Lagoon empties into the Atlantic Ocean via Lagos Harbour, a main channel through the heart of the city, 0.5 km to 1 km wide and 10 km long. The principal ocean port of Lagos is located at Apapa in a broad western branch off the main channel of the harbour.

Another branch off the main channel that is narrower and longer separates Lagos Island from Victoria Island, the broad sand spit which forms the coastline.

The city spreads along more than 30 km of the lagoon's south-western and western shoreline. Pollution by urban and industrial waste is a major problem as a large amount of wastewater is released into the lagoon daily. The 11-km-long Third Mainland Bridge was built off the western shore to by-pass congested mainland suburbs.

To its north-east the lagoon is connected by a channel passing south of the town of Epe to the Lekki Lagoon. Narrow winding channels connect the system through a broad band of coastal swamps and rivers, as far away as Sapele, 250 km to the east.

The areas around west-Lagos Lagoon are not well provided with roads and many communities there traditionally rely on water transport.

In the middle of the lagoon are the Palaver Islands.

== Pollution and degradation due to human activities ==
The Lagos Lagoon, situated in one of the fastest growing megacities in the world, Lagos which is known for its rapid growth in population and industrial development, has become a hub of industrial, agricultural and domestic wastes. According to WHO and Africa UN Environment, Lagos Lagoon is the most polluted African ecosystem with its major wastes coming from oil and textile industry as well as urban sewage carried by the Ogun and Osun rivers.

Excessive fishing activities, sand mining and dredging, also contribute to the degradation of the Lagoon's ecosystem. In a study conducted, it was found that these wastes disposed in the lagoon are a threat to fish and mammal biology, which can in turn be harmful to humans. They contain heavy metals such as mercury and cadmium, organic compounds PCBs, Phenolsa, PAHs and organotins.

== Gallery ==
Lagos Lagoon

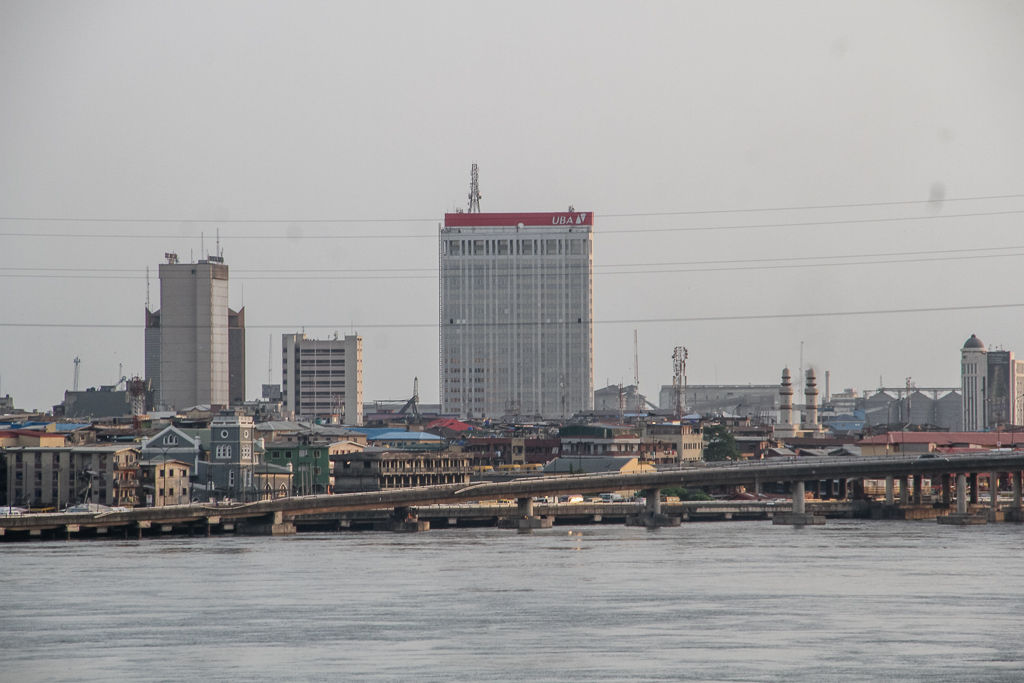
Lagos Lagoon, Nigeria

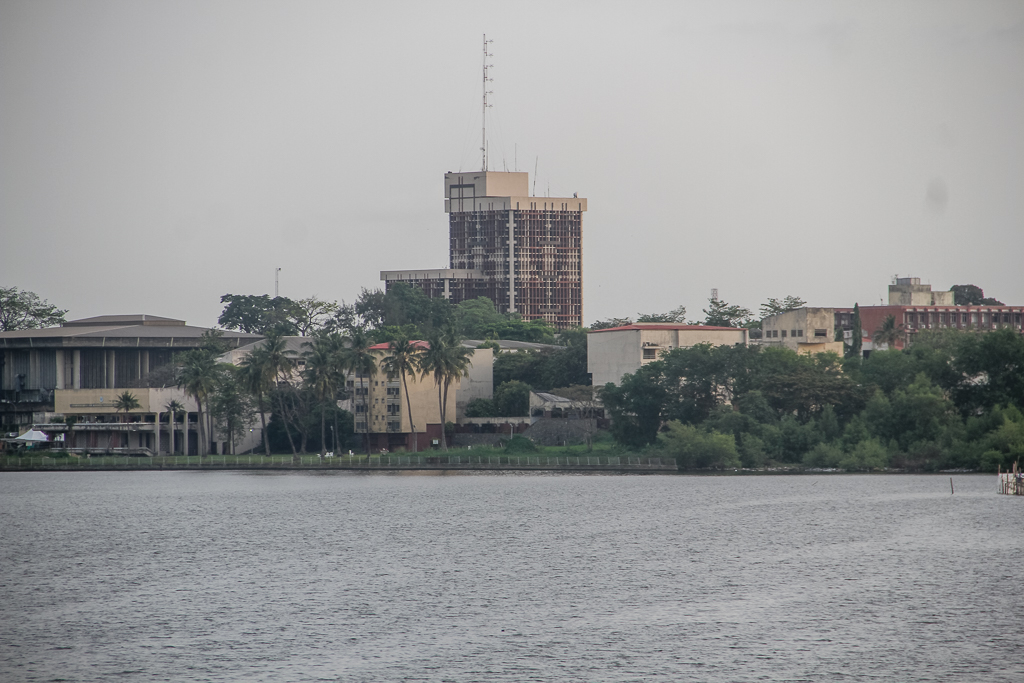
Lagos Lagoon, Nigeria

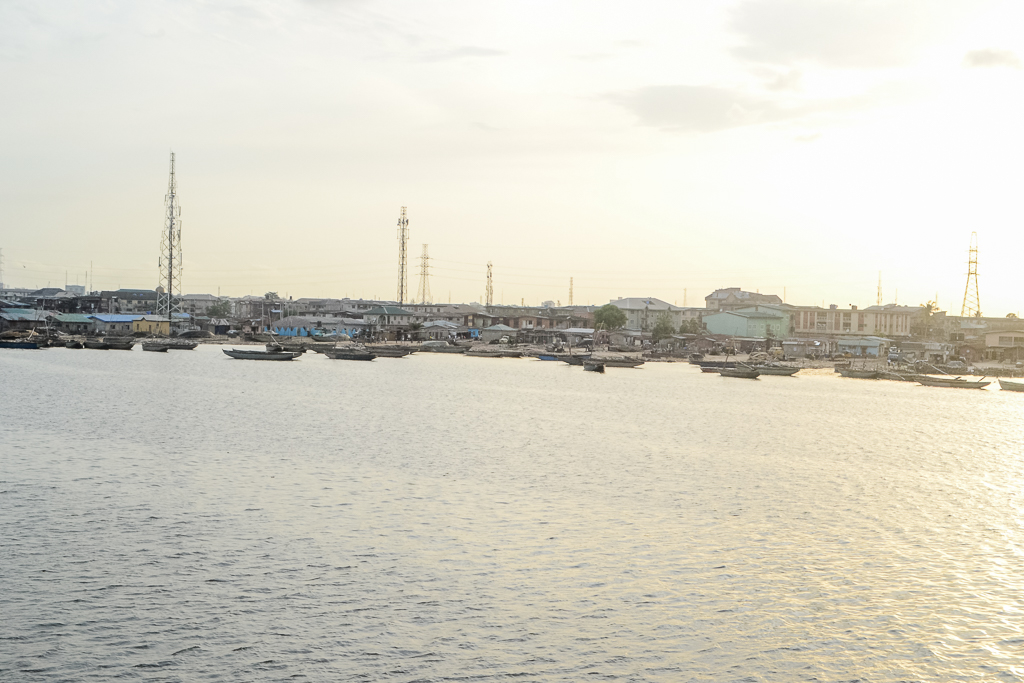
Lagos Lagoon

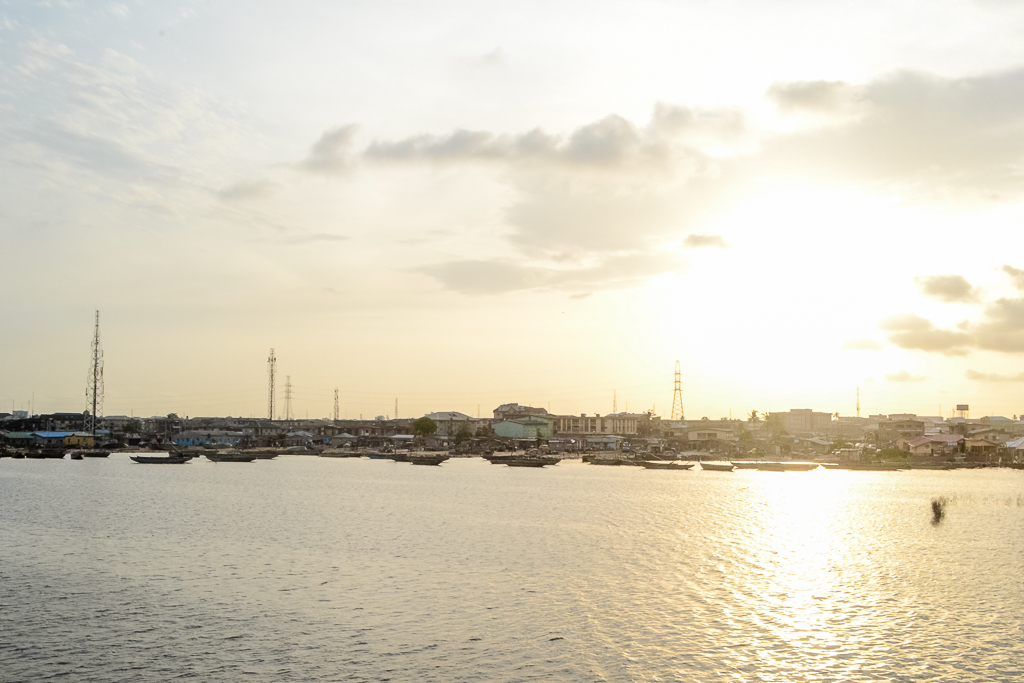
Lagos Lagoon
