= Miyonse Amosu =

Nigerian media personality and chef (born 1992)

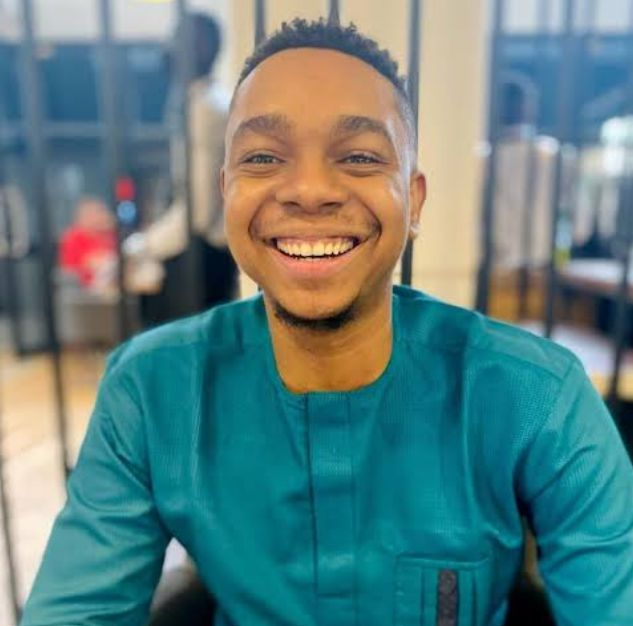
- Miyonse in 2023
- Born: Miyonse Oluwaseyi Amosu; 26 August 1992 (age 34); Lagos
- Education: Early Life Secondary School, Lagos; University of Lagos
- Occupation: Chef
- Years active: 2018–present

Miyonse Amosu (born August 26, 1992) is a Nigerian chef and media personality from Badagry in Lagos State, Nigeria. He is known for being a Professional Chef and housemate in the Big Brother Naija season 2. He previously hosted the cooking segment of the Wake Up Nigeria breakfast show on TVC Entertainment.

== Early life and education ==
Born in Festac Town, Lagos State to an entrepreneur father and a mum who is a nurse, he is the last of four children with an elder sister as well as two elder brothers. He went through nursery and primary education at AT-BET International School in Lagos, Nigeria's most populous city.

He had his secondary education at Early Life Secondary School in Lagos, graduating in 2009, and proceeded to the University of Lagos where he bagged a Bachelor of Science (B.sc) degree in Mass Communication in 2013. After leaving the university, he had a brief stint at the Lagos State Signage & Advertisement Agency (LASAA), before deciding to make a switch to the culinary profession.

== Big Brother ==
In 2017, he went in as one of an eventual 14 housemates on the second season of the popular reality show Big Brother Nigeria. In June 2017, he was announced as the maiden ambassador for Payporte Food store.

== Awards and recognition ==
He was awarded for his “remarkable contribution” to the entertainment industry during the City People's Awards which held in August 2017 and also won the award for Outstanding Television Chef of the Year at the Nigerian Culinary Professionals Awards for his work on Wake Up Nigeria.

He has worked with notable brands such as Martell France, Coca-Cola, Morning Fresh, Indomie Noodles, Malta Guiness among other brands. He currently work also as a Chef Instructor at Red Dish Chronicles.
