= Lagos Free Zone =

Lagos Free Zone (LFZ) is a Free Trade Zone situated in Lagos that is promoted by Tolaram group. The Free zone is integrated with Lekki Deep Sea Port and covers 830 hectares of area in Lagos. Lagos Free Zone is located 60 kilometers to the east of Lagos city. Similar to other free zones, companies in LFZ can sell all their goods in Nigerian customs territory with no state or federal taxes charged without an import or export license. They can also repatriate their profits and dividends. Raffles Oil and Insignia Systems, Inc. were the first and second companies to come to the zone respectively. LFZ is located under the jurisdiction of Lagos State Government and the state government had provided the land for LFZ. It was started in 2002 with 215 hectares. Later in 2012, around 590 hectares more land was given by the state government. The construction, however, was handled by Lagos Free Trade Zone Company.
