= Rahman Owokoniran =

Nigerian politician

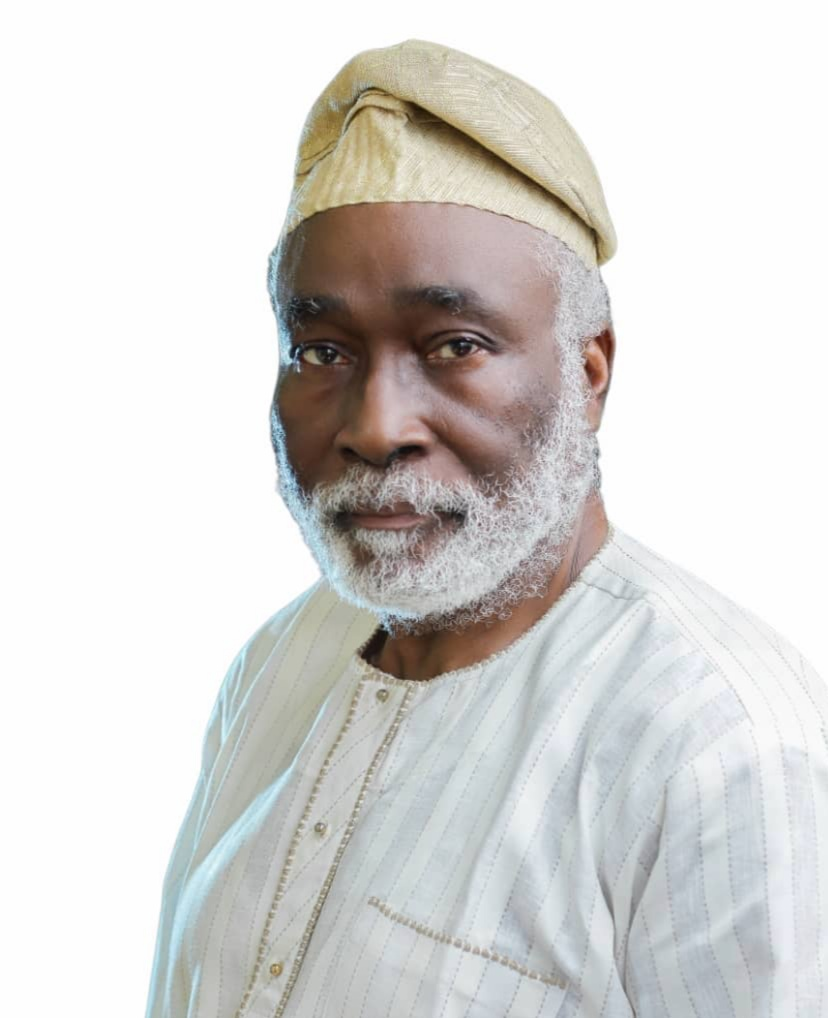

Zonal Secretary of the Peoples Democratic Party (Nigeria)
- Incumbent
- Assumed office 2021

Personal details
- Party: Peoples Democratic Party (Nigeria)
- Spouse: Subuola Owokoniran

Rahman Owokoniran is a former member of the Lagos State House of Assembly. He was appointed commissioner for Housing (2003) and then commissioner for chieftaincy and boundary affairs (2006) under Bola Tinubu's tenure as Lagos State Governor. He led as the chairman of the committee for the creation of the twenty Local government areas and seventeen Local development councils in Lagos State. He currently emerged as the Secretary of Peoples Democratic Party (Nigeria) after elections which were held in Osogbo, Osun State recently.

== Education ==
Rahman Owokoniran was born into the Alhaji A.S.B. Owokoniran family. He received his B.A. Political Science from the Eastern Washington University, Cheney, Washington State, United States of America and his Masters of Public Administration also from Eastern Washington University.

== Career and politics ==
Rahman Akanni Owokoniran is the new South-West Peoples Democratic Party, PDP, Secretary. But he has been around since the Second Nigerian Republic. Owokoniran was part of the formation of the Unity Party of Nigeria, UPN, on whose platform he became a member of Lagos State House of Assembly in 1983.

He became Chairman of the Congress for National Consensus, CNC. He moved to Alliance for Democracy (Nigeria), AD, and was appointed Chairman, Lagos State Local Government Council Creation Committee, which created twenty LGAs and seventeen LCDAs. He was appointed Commissioner for Housing (2003) and then Commissioner for Chieftaincy and Boundary Affairs (2006).

He is a chieftain of the Peoples Democratic Party (Nigeria) and has served as political Campaigns Director General for Senator Bola Ahmad Tinubu, Jimi Agbaje, Lamido, Atiku Abubaka, etc. He was also former deputy chairman of the PDP in Lagos State.
