= Paul Boroh =

Nigerian politician

Brigadier general Paul Boroh
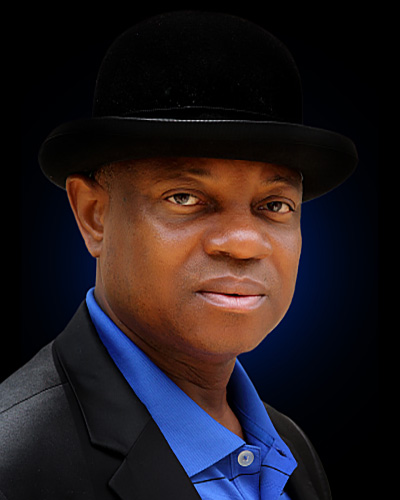

Special Adviser to the Nigerian president and Coordinator, Presidential Amnesty Programme in the Niger Delta
- In office May 2015 – March 2018

Personal details
- Born: 17 July 1958 (age 68)
- Education: Nigerian Defence Academy, Kaduna

Military service
- Allegiance: Nigeria
- Branch/service: Nigerian Army
- Rank: Brigadier general
- Commands: Commander, Nigerian Battalion (NIBATT) 4 in Sierra Leone (2000); Commander, 29 Battalion, Kaduna (2000); Commander, Operation Harmony, Bakassi Peninsular (2001); Commandant, Nigerian Army Peacekeeping Centre (2010-2012)

Paul Tarela Boroh (born 17 July 1958) is a Nigerian politician and retired Nigerian Army brigadier general, he served as Special Adviser to President Muhammadu Buhari on Niger Delta and Coordinator of the Presidential Amnesty Programme between May 2015 and March 2018. He was fired for reasons not made public. However, the reason he was fired may not be unconnected with financial misappropriation. Days after being fired, he was arrested by the EFCC and a sum of US$9,000,000 cash was recovered from his house in Abuja.

== Early life ==
Boroh was born in Lagos State on 17 July 1958. He is from Sagbama Local Government Area of Bayelsa State. In his early life, he attended the Nigerian Military School, Zaria in Kaduna State from 1972 to 1976 where he obtained his West African School Certificate. He was later admitted into the Nigerian Defence Academy, Kaduna from 1978 to 1981. On completion of his training, he was commissioned into the Nigerian Army Infantry Corps on 19 June 1981 as a member of 24 Regular Combatant Commission.

== Career ==
Boroh is a peace practitioner and was at one time a member of the United Nations Mission in Sierra Leone (UNAMSIL) peacekeeping operation. As commanding Nigerian Battalion (NIBATT) 4 in March 2000, he provided security by patrolling the city of Freetown the capital of Sierra Leone to prevent the RUF rebels from taking over the city. He protected the president, Ahmad Tijan Kabba, the vice president, the special representative of the UN Secretary General (SRSG), and Ambassador O. Adeniji. The UNAMSIL Force Commander, Major General JET Lee and all the UN Staff and UN Asserts in Freetown.

In April of the same year, he was involved in the peace enforcement operations in Sierra Leone, OP KUKRI which was a rescue operation to free about 500 UN peacekeepers and 11 military observes held captive by the RUF rebel fighters in Kailahun, Eastern Sierra Leone. Another peace enforcement operation he was involved in was OP OKRAHILLS which was to clear the major road to the hinterland, to allow humanitarian resources to be taken to civilians caught in the conflict. Lastly, he was also involved in OP THUNDERBOLT conducted by the British forces in Sierra Leone to extricate some British soldiers held by Sierra Leonean soldiers popularly known as West Side Boys.

Back home, as commanding officer of 29 Battalion in Kaduna, he was involved in the resolution of the Ethno-Religious Conflict of 2000, by conducting dialogue between the stakeholders in the conflict including the religious leaders both Christians and Muslims on 18 December 2000.

In 2001, as Commanding Officer in OP HARMONY in Bakassi Peninsular, at the Nigerian- Cameron border, He prevented open confrontation between Nigeria and Cameroon by ensuring that his soldiers did not violate the MOU which restrained the troops from firing, except for self-defence.

In the years 2002, 2003 and 2004, he coordinated the series of seminars and workshops as reflected above, under seminars and workshops, he has also been involved in conduction training activities, lecturing, and dissemination of directives instructions as well as evaluating operational administratives and logistics readiness of the Nigerian Army before reporting to UNMIL in January 2009.

With the urge in maintaining peace as the UNMIL Chief of Staff (Forces), he initiated the outreach program between the Angie Brooks International Centre and the UNMIL which led to the training of Eight (8) participants in UNMIL Civil Military Coordination (CIMIC) Course from January 11–15, 2010, with the aim of giving participants clearer understanding of the working system in UN and also for the enhancement and contribution of sustainable peace in Liberia. He also established capacity building programmes for capable Liberian citizen.

Additionally, he was entrusted with responsibility of the Nigeria at 50th Golden Jubilee Anniversary Parade as the Chairman Sub-Committee on Parade.

He was the commandant of the Nigerian Army Peacekeeping Centre from September 2010-March 2012. The pioneer Centre for Excellence for training Nigerian Peacekeepers before inducting into the UNITED NATIONS mission. He was the deputy commandant of Nigeria Armed forces Resettlement Centre (NAFRC) Oshodi Lagos, where his major responsibility was the management of human resources.

In July 2015, Boroh's appointment as Coordinator of the Amnesty Programme for former Niger Delta militants was approved by President Muhammdu Buhari.

In July 2016, he commented to The New York Times saying that the Nigerian federal government "reined it (Conflict in the Niger Delta) in by setting up an amnesty program that offers cash and job training, some of it overseas, for more than 30,000 militants and residents". Boroh said he had lobbied the Nigerian president to keep the plan for now, but to phase it out over the next two years, after the President considered ending the amnesty program at the end of last year due to funding issues caused by low oil prices.
