= Omogie Ojei =

Nigerian visual artist and poet

Femi.the.god
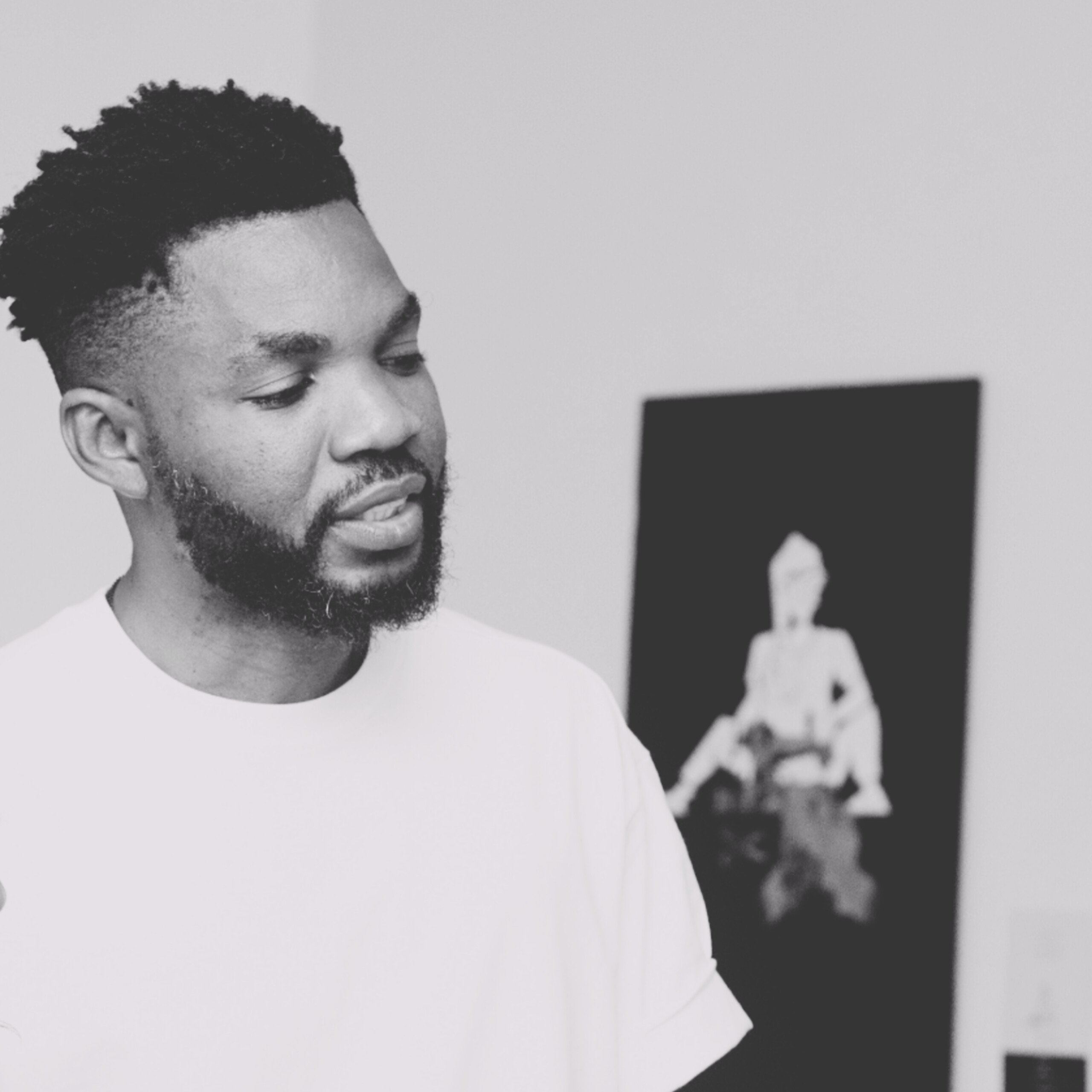
- Born: Omogie Ojei; Lagos, Nigeria
- Other name: femi.the.god
- Education: University of Lagos (B.Sc. Ed.)
- Occupations: Visual artist, poet, designer
- Years active: 2010–present
- Known for: Combining visual art with poetry, telling stories around Lagos culture.
- Movement: Contemporary art
- Website: www.femithegod.art

Omogie Ojei, known professionally as femi.the.god, is a Nigerian visual artist and poet based in the United Kingdom. His artwork incorporates poetry and visual mediums, primarily focused on contemporary life in Lagos.

== Early life and education ==
Ojei was born in Lagos, Nigeria. Raised in Lagos, his early environment informed his focus on documenting urban social themes. He studied Building Technology and Education at the University of Lagos, earning a Bachelor of Science (Education). During this period, he became involved in illustration, poetry, fashion, and other creative work.

== Career ==
=== Early creative work ===
Ojei began his creative career stenciling his art on t-shirts, which connected him to Lagos's urban fashion and visual culture scenes. He later founded the apparel branding agency Platinum J Co. and the fashion brand Ijapa.

=== Visual art practice ===
Working under the name femi.the.god, Ojei developed a multidisciplinary practice involving painting, digital illustration, collage, installation, and poetry. Working across painting, digital illustration, collage, and installation, his pieces combine abstract forms and mixed media. Media reports have highlighted his 'craft on canvas' technique, which translates digital compositions into physical works. Critics have described his work as combining documentary and conceptual elements, with an emphasis on memory, cultural preservation, and social experience.

== Exhibitions and reception ==
Ojei has held several solo exhibitions, including Up from Nothing (2022) and Envying Mortality (2023). His exhibitions have been reviewed by The Guardian, Vanguard, Daily Independent, and other outlets. In 2023, his work was presented at events associated with TEDx Lagos.

== Artistic style and themes ==
His practice integrates poetry alongside minimalist visual forms. Recurring themes include social hierarchy, identity, and undocumented historical narratives in Nigeria.

== Other creative work ==
In the early 2010s, Ojei worked briefly as a musician under the name J Magic. He released the song "My Guitar" in 2012, produced by DJ Klem. He later shifted his focus to visual art and multidisciplinary work.

== Public speaking and collaborations ==
Ojei has participated in public discussions on art and society, including delivering a talk at the TEDx Lagos Salon in 2023. He has also collaborated with curators and cultural organisations on exhibitions and creative projects.

== Selected exhibitions ==
- Up from Nothing (2022), Lagos - Envying Mortality (2023), Lagos - Around the City (2023), Lagos
