= Eti-Osa East =

Eti-Osa East is a local council development area in Nigeria. It was split off from Eti-Osa Local Government Area in 2003.
