= Henry Ajomale =

Nigerian politician

- Born: Lagos State, Nigeria
- Citizenship: Nigerian
- Occupations: technocrat; politician; administrator

Henry Ajomale is a Nigerian politician, technocrat and former Commissioner for Special Duties, Lagos State, Nigeria. He is the past chairman of the All Progressives Congress, Lagos State chapter. His son is a member of House of assembly constituency 2 oshodi isholo
