= Federal College of Fisheries and Marine Technology =

Agricultural school on Victoria Island, Nigeria

Coordinates: 6°25′15″N 3°24′42″E

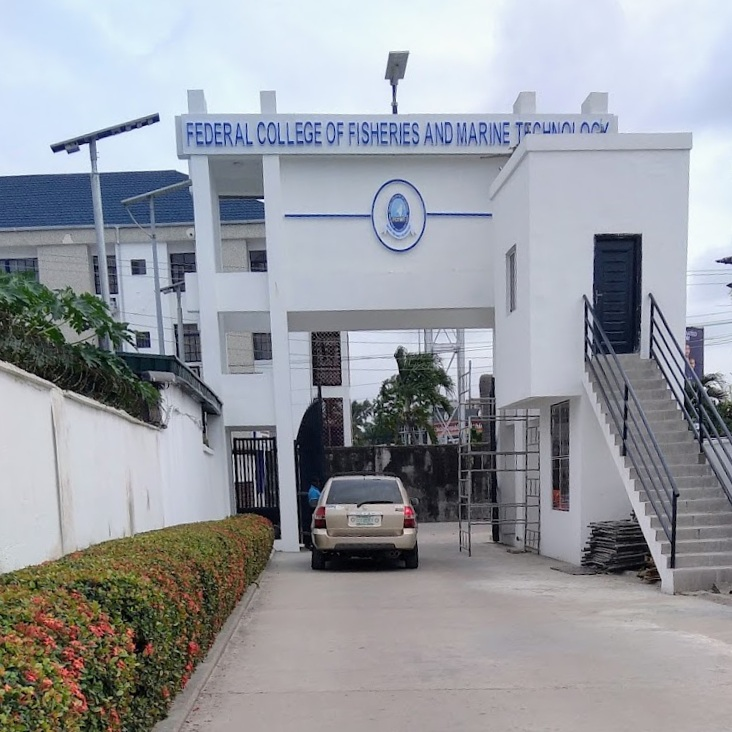
- Established: 1969
- Location: Lagos State, Nigeria
- Website: fcfmt.edu.ng

The Federal College of Fisheries and Marine Technology is a higher education institute located on Victoria Island in Lagos, Nigeria. It is a monotechnic approved by the National Board for Technical Education. The College was originally known as the Federal School of Fisheries, established in 1969 as a vocational training institute for Nigeria's in-shore fishing fleet. It was upgraded to a technological institution in 1992. The college offers courses in fisheries technology, general science, marine engineering, nautical science and Maritime Transport and Business Management. It has two hostels, accommodating about 450 students.

The college is headed by a provost who reports the Minister of Agriculture. In February 2009, Samuel Azikwe Zelibe, former head of the Fisheries Department of Delta State University, was appointed provost. In January 2010, the provost warned that despite the N74 million government allocation and a N37.4 million World Bank grant last year, the college had scarcely enough funding to cover basic needs, let alone upgrade facilities and purchase a training vessel. He said more money was needed to develop a Fishery Technology laboratory, raise buildings and build roads.

The college fronts Victoria Beach, which is rapidly eroding. When the building was commissioned in May 1993, the beach was about 150 m (490 ft) wide. Two years later, waves had reached to within a few meters of the foundation of the buildings, forcing construction of a protective groyne.

== Matriculation ==
The school matriculate 300 students for 2021/2022 academics section. Students matriculated applied for both ND and HND program.

=== 2023/2024 matriculation ===
FCFMT matriculated her newly admitted students in May 2024 for 2023/2024 academics section.

== See also ==
- List of polytechnics in Nigeria
