= Lekki Lagoon =

Nigerian lagoon

- Location within Nigeria
- Location: Lagos State and Ogun State, Nigeria
- Type: Lagoon
- Part of: Lagos Lagoon system
- Primary outflows: Channel to Lagos Lagoon
- Basin countries: Nigeria
- Settlements: Lagos

Lekki Lagoon is a lagoon located in Lagos and Ogun states in Nigeria. The lagoon lies directly to the east of Lagos Lagoon and is connected to it by a channel. It is surrounded by many beaches. The surrounding vegetation is predominantly characterized by swamp forests and mangrove vegetation, which helps stabilize the shoreline and filter pollutants. Economically, the lagoon is vital for the livelihood of numerous surrounding communities, serving as a major source of protein and income through artisanal fishing.
