= Lekki Port =

Deep-sea port in Lagos State, Nigeria

Deep sea port Lekki
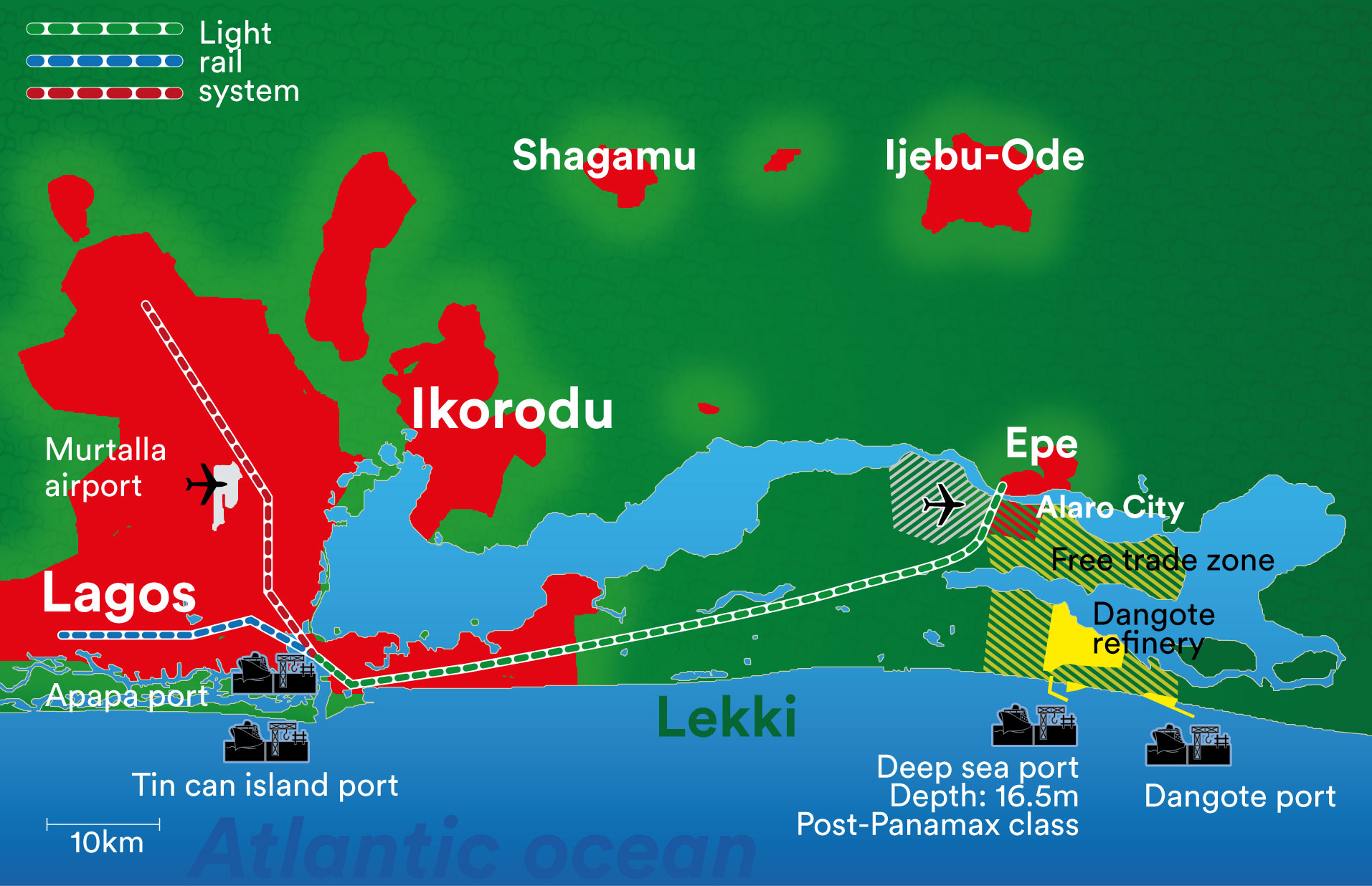
- Lagos and the deep sea port Lekki
- Interactive map of Deep sea port Lekki

Location
- Country: Nigeria
- Location: Lagos
- Coordinates: 6.428°N 4.007°E
- UN/LOCODE: NG

Details
- Opened: 2022; 4 years ago
- Operated by: Lekki Port LFTZ Enterprise Limited
- Owned by: China Harbour Engineering Company and Tolaram Group.
- Type of Harbor: tidal port
- No. of piers: Container terminal, terminal for liquid goods, terminal for bulk goods
- Draft depth: 16.5 m (54 ft) depth

Statistics
- Annual cargo tonnage: 4 million tons per year
- Annual container volume: 2.5 million teu
- Website https://lekkiport.com/

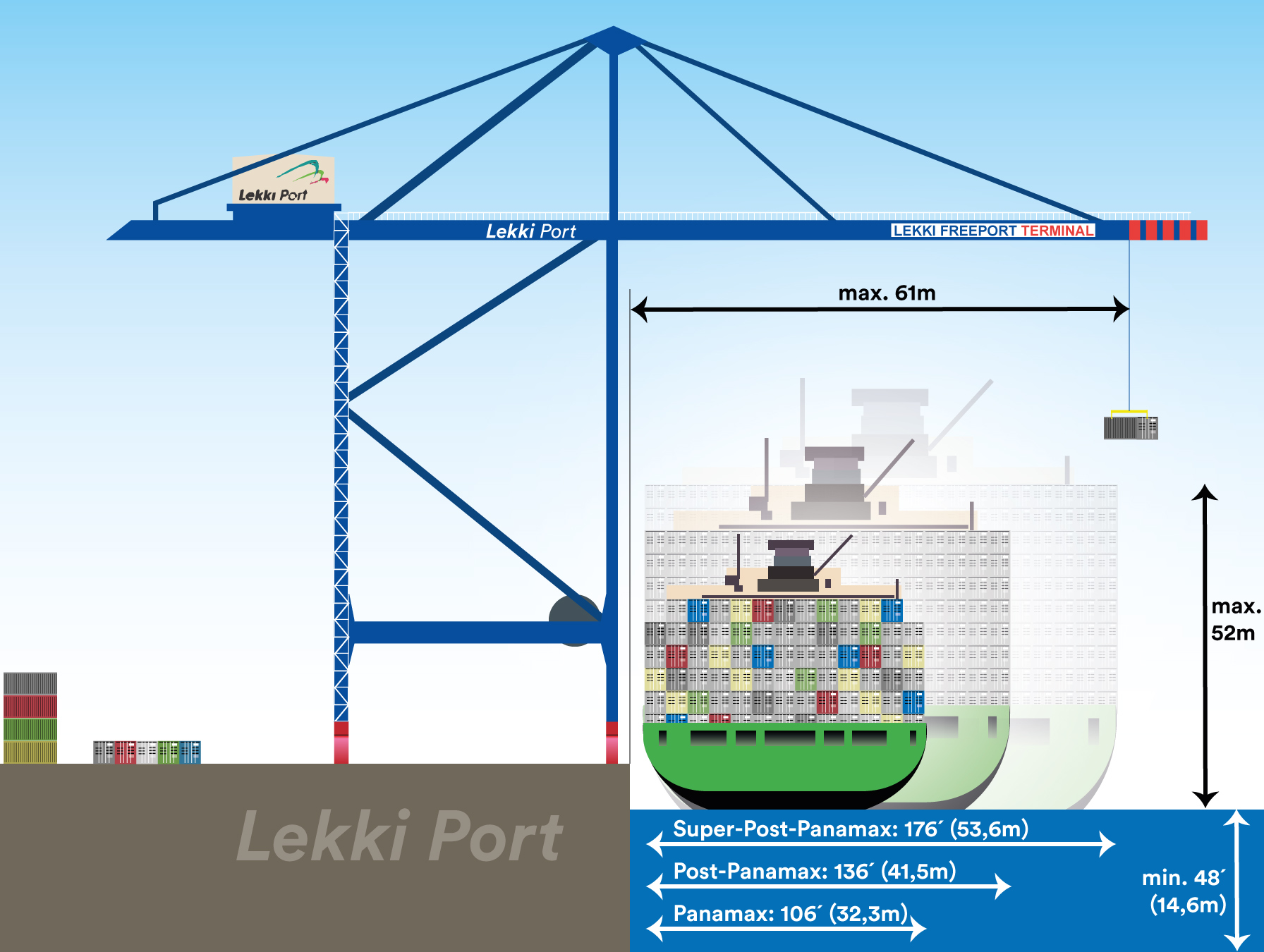
STS crane at Lekki Port; container ship sizes

Lekki Deep Sea Port, is a multi-purpose, deep sea port in the Lagos Free Zone and is the only currently operating deep sea port in the country, having started full commercial operations in April 2023.

It is the largest seaport of Nigeria and one of the biggest in West Africa. Lekki port is to be expanded to have a capacity of handling around 6 million TEUs of containers and a significant volume of liquid and dry bulk uncontainerized cargoes. The port is to be equipped with ships able to transport over 14,500 containers.

The port is being developed in phases. Its phase one, be operational in 2018, chiefly comprises it three container berths equipped to handle more than 1.8 million TEUs — one berth for dry bulk goods and two berths for liquid cargo.

The port is financed by private investors and a consortium of banks who have funded the project with $1.5 billion as of March 2021. The seaport is to occupy up to 90 hectares of land. The port started commercial operations in April 2023.

On October, 31st, 2022, the port has been handed over to the owners. Commissioning will start "in the next month". Lagos State governor Sanwo-Olu promised on this occasion to expand the roads to the port to 6 lane highways.

On 22 January 2023, a few hours before the official inauguration by President Buhari, the first commercial ship, the container freighter CMA CGM MOZART, docked at the port.

== Design ==
The layout of the port, including the layout of the approach channel, turning circle, and harbor basins have been derived from optimizations based on port operations, construction costs, and possible future extensions.

Two different breakwater concepts were applied for the main breakwater: A rubble mound with geo-bag core for the near-shore sections and a composite breakwater for the more exposed sections. The main breakwater is 1.5 km long.

The secondary breakwater was replaced by a barrier. The barrier consists of a core from sand, internally fortified by a protective geo-bag layer, a revetment on the harbor side, and an artificial beach on the seaward side.

The turning circle is 600 metres (2,000 ft), enough for a vessel up to 16,000 standard containers (teu). The approach channel is 11 km long.

== Terminals ==
The port has three terminals: the container terminal, the liquid terminal and the dry bulk terminal.

=== Container terminal ===
The container terminal has an initial draft of 14 metres (46 ft), with the potential for further dredging to 16.5 metres (54 ft). The terminal is able to handle 2.5 million twenty-foot standard containers per year. The deep-sea port of Lekki is the first port in Nigeria with ship-to-shore cranes. It has three of these container gantry cranes; they belong to the "Super-post-Panamax" group - this means that they can reach and unload the rearmost row of containers even if the container ship is wider than the Panama Canal (49 m or 160 ft maximum boat beam).

The STS cranes have a fixed rail at the quayside. They can lift 65 tons in twin-lift mode, 50 tons in single-lift mode or 85 tons under a hook. The outreach from the quayside is 61 metres (200 ft) (this corresponds to 25 container rows). - The world's biggest container ship (as of 2022), the EVER ALOT, has a width of 61.5 metres (202 ft). - The air draft (the maximum height from which containers can be picked up) is 52 metres (171 ft). Each STS crane generates 300 lux of light, which means that even at night the area around the crane will be nearly as bright as daylight. Cameras will assist operators when working at difficult angles.

The port's computerised system will allow container identification and clearance from the office, and human interaction will be minimal in the physical operations. Nevertheless, the port will create 169,972 jobs, according to executive director, Du Ruogang. The additional revenue for the Nigerian state through taxes, levies and royalties is estimated at $201 billion. A directive from President Buhari (who will, however, leave office at the beginning of 2023) provides for the deep-sea port to be connected to the Nigerian rail network.

=== Liquid cargo terminal ===
When phase 2 will be finished, the deep sea port will have 3 liquid berths. The liquid cargo terminal will handle vessels up to 45,000 DWT (dead weight tonnage) and can expand to reach a capacity of 160,000 DWT. Liquids (like petrol or diesel) will be handled at a tank farm near the port. The docking area is equipped with loading arms. It is also connected by pipelines along the breakwater.

In December 2022 the chief operating officer of Lekki Port LFTZ Enterprise Limited, Laurence Smith, opened talks with potential operators of the Liquid berth terminals. This would be critical to the commencement of the construction of Phase 2 of the port.

=== Dry bulk terminal ===
The bulk terminal will be finished with phase 2 and will be situated on the west side of the container terminal. The available quay length of 300 m (980 ft) can accommodate a Panamax class vessel (75,000 DWT). Bulk products are brought to storage areas, such as silos and warehouses, via covered conveyor systems. The bulk terminal capacity is around 4 million tonnes of dry bulk annually.

=== Rail connection ===
On December 29, 2022, Lekki Port Enterprises announced, that it will fund a US$800 million railway line from the harbour to Ijebu-Ode, where it will connect to the proposed railway line Lagos - Benin-City- Calabar (Eastern railway line).

== Start of operation ==
On July 1, 2022, the first ship, "Zhen Hua 28" from Hongkong, docked at the deep sea port of Lekki. The vessel brought three Super Post Panamax Ship To Shore (STS) cranes and ten Rubber Tyred Gantry cranes.

Early August 2022, a second ship, "Zhen Hua 35" from Shanghai, brought the second shipment, two STS cranes including 115 packages of accessories, and 5 Rubber-Tyre-Gantry cranes including 270 packages of accessories.

The port management announced in August 2022, that the port will be opened by the next month.

According to managing director of the Nigerian Ports Authority (NPA), Mohammed Bello-Koko, tests and dry runs will be underway at the deepwater port from 16 September 2022. Recruitment has already been carried out. The necessary training with the cranes, the computer system and the clearance system is taking place, but still needs some time.

Other West African countries, such as Chad, Mali, Niger and Cameroon, have already shown interest in handling their imports and exports through the deep sea port of Lekki.

The port started commercial operations in April 2023, though the slowdown in the Nigerian economy negatively affected initial volume of import and export containers.
