= Aino Ternstedt Oni-Okpaku =

Textile artist, founder of an orphanage, philanthropist (1939–2019)

- Born: Aino Ternstedt Oni-Okpaku; January 2, 1939; Gothenburg, Sweden
- Died: December 26, 2019 (aged 80); Gothenburg, Sweden
- Citizenship: Swedish
- Occupations: Textile artist, businesswoman, philanthropist
- Known for: Founder of Quintessence gallery and the Erubodo Foundation

Aino Margareta Ternstedt Oni-Okpaku (2 January 1939 – 26 December 2019) was a Swedish textile artist, philanthropist, and orphanage founder who worked in Nigeria. She operated in Lagos from 1975 with her husband, where they sold imported antique furniture, high-end hi-fi equipment, and various accessories.

== Education ==
She was trained as a textile artist at the Arts and Handicrafts School, Slöjdföreningens skola, (now HDK-Valand) in Gothenburg. Oni-Okpaku was awarded an American-Scandinavian scholarship that supplemented her studies in art and handicrafts at Stanford University in California, USA, from 1971 to 1973.

== Career ==
Oni-Okpaku established an orphanage for children with functional impairments known as Erubodo House and also the Ebunoluwa Foundation. She facilitated both local and international exhibitions of Nigerian arts and crafts in countries such as Sweden, the UK, and Germany, including African countries such as Zimbabwe, Ghana, and Burkina Faso. During her lifetime, she served as a trustee of the Ben Enwonwu Foundation, with a strong commitment to improving global perception and appreciation of contemporary African art.

In 1973, she co-founded Quintessence Art Gallery, Ikoyi, with her husband, featuring antique-style furniture, wearable art, and crafts; decades before Nike Art Gallery.

== Personal life ==
Oni-Okpaku was born in the town of Lilla Edet, Sweden, in 1939 to Carl-Herman Ternstedt, an engineer, and Elisabeth Göransdotter (née Enderlein). She was the first child and had two younger siblings, Marianne Agby and Gunnar Ternstedt.

She was married to Olusegun Gabriel Oni-Okpaku, a legal practitioner who was studying art at her university. They married in 1972 and moved to Nigeria that same year, her husband's home country. They had two children, Tina Ternstedt and Jude Ternstedt. After losing her husband in 1977, she never remarried.

== Death ==
She died in 2019 at the age of 80 in her home country, Sweden. Oni-Okpaku was laid to rest on January 20, 2020, in Gothenburg, while a memorial service and a testimonial session were held in Lagos on February 20, 2020.
