= Wurafadaka =

Nigerian clothing brand

- Type: Private company
- Industry: Fashion
- Founded: 24 November 2014; 11 years ago
- Founder: Tijesuni Omotoyosi Simire
- Headquarters: Lekki, Lagos, Nigeria,
- Area served: Africa; Europe; United States
- Key people: Adedamola Tijesuni-Simire (CEO); Osunbayo Paul Taiwo (General manager)
- Number of employees: 200+
- Website: wurafadakaglobal.com

Wurafadaka is a Nigerian fashion house established in 2014. Its headquarters is in Lekki, Lagos. The brand's product line includes accessories, clothing and footwear.

== History ==
Wurafadaka, which means "Gold" and "Silver" in Yoruba language was founded by Tijesuni Omotoyosi Simire and was launched in November 2014. A few years after its establishment, the director married Adedamola Tijesuni Simire and he relocated from Europe to Nigeria together with his spouse to open the clothing brand's office in Ilorin.

Between 2014 and 2020, Wurafadaka has expanded nationwide with over 100 employees and stores within Kwara State, Abuja, Delta State, and Ogun state. In February 2023, Wurafadaka expanded its reach abroad by launching a new international branch in British Columbia and Canada.

In 2023, Wurafadaka was listed among the 5 Emerging Nigerian fashion brands to watch by Nigerian Online and Print newspaper, Nigerian Tribune.

In 2024 Adedamola Tijesuni-Simire, the wife of the founder was appointed as the new CEO of Wurafadaka based on her expertise in business administration and project management. Also Osunbayo Paul Taiwo was appointed as General Manager for its Nigeria region.

At its 10th anniversary, in November 2024, WuraFadaka hosted 150 fashion business owners and entrepreneurs on a masterclass committed to empowering young entrepreneurs and driving the fashion industry forward across the nation. The Masterclass was held at WuraFadaka Fashion Institute, a Division situated in Ilorin, Nigeria.

In February 2025, the clothing brand opened an additional centre in Lekki Phase 1, Lagos officially naming it as the brand’s headquarters. Wurafadaka provides a 24 hour production timeframe of customized outfits and delivery service for there customers, also offers online ordering and purchases of products services across various E-commerce channels.

Over the years, Wurafadaka’s Fashion Institute has trained various interested individuals on the discipline of sewing unisex wears, training over 1,000 individuals with a 99% success rate. Wurafadaka officially partnered with DHL to offer delivery of its products internationally, with a three days delivery duration for clients orders outside Nigeria.

== Services ==
Wurafadaka Specializes in Ankara, Adire, Kampala, Lace, Aso-Oke. Also modern outfits including customized T-shirts, Polo, shorts, trousers, skirts, gowns, bespoke suits, Agbada, senators, Iro and Buba. Wurafadaka brand deals on customized traditional and cooperate wears for both genders and various ages.
