= Lekki International Airport =

Proposed international airport to serve Lagos, Nigeria

Lekki-Epe International Airport
- IATA: none; ICAO: none

Summary
- Serves: Lekki
- Location: Lekki, Lagos State, Nigeria
- Coordinates: 6.5698157°N 3.9047522°E
- Interactive map of Lekki-Epe International Airport

Lekki International Airport is a proposed airport in Lekki, Nigeria, designed for a capacity of 5 million passengers annually.

== Background ==
The Lekki Airport project is projected to cost ₦71.64bn (US$ 450 million) in its first phase, planned to be situated 10 km from Lekki Free Trade Zone (LFTZ), and was originally proposed to open in 2028.

It will be designed to cater for the Airbus A380, making it a Code F-compliant airport.

In 2011, the Lagos State Government appointed Stanbic IBTC Bank as financial adviser for the airport project with a proposed 2012 opening.

By 2019, the airport had still not been awarded or begun construction with funding difficulties being reported.

== See also ==
- List of airports in Nigeria
