= Nike Art Gallery =

Art gallery in Lekki, Nigeria, owned by Nike Davies-Okundaye

Coordinates: 6.4315°N 3.4819°E

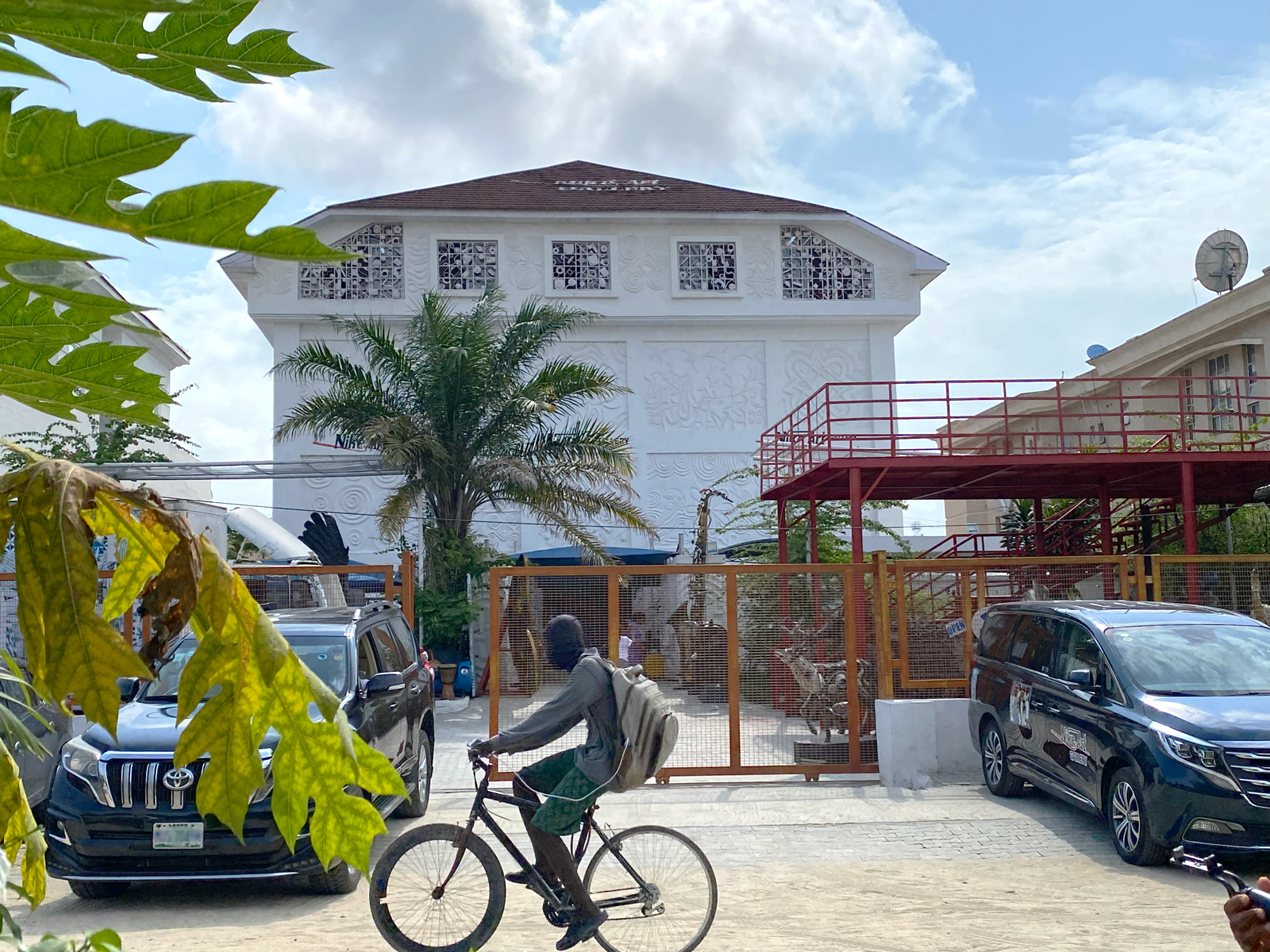
Nike Art Gallery in Lekki, Lagos (2026)

The Nike Art Gallery is West Africa’s most extensive art collection. Its biggest and most famous branch is situated in the Lekki district of the Lagos metropolitan area, Nigeria. All branches are owned by Nike Davies-Okundaye. Together with the nearby Lekki Conservation Centre, it is one of Lagos’s most important tourist attractions. It has no connection with the sportswear manufacturer of the same name.

== Foundation ==
In 2009, Nike Okundaye founded the gallery to promote African art and create a sustainable environment for its development. Since then, the gallery has had a positive impact on the art and cultural landscape in Nigeria.

== Purpose ==
Deutsche Welle outlines the purpose of the gallery as follows:

"The gallery aims to positively transform the long-neglected arts and culture industry in Nigeria and encourage the growth of African cultural heritage. This gallery is a well-known cultural spot and tourist destination in West Africa, especially among young people, many of whom discovered it on social media. Nike's dream is to bridge the age gap in art appreciation. She provides training to young artists in visual, musical, and performing arts. These artists then showcase their skills to guests, demonstrating their traditions while earning a living. The space is open to art enthusiasts of all ages, offering guests a unique opportunity to connect with their roots and foster a sense of community and pride. Nike wants to show how art transcends family, tradition, community, and love."

== Scope ==
With over 500 works by artists on display and a collection of 25,000 artworks, the Nike Art Gallery has now become a cultural hub in the metropolis of Lagos.

The gallery spans four floors and exhibits works from Nigeria and other African countries.

== Admission, shipment ==
Admission is free. Tourists who are reluctant to take the paintings home – claiming they are beautiful but too bulky to take on the flight – are assured that the gallery will also arrange for them to be shipped overseas.

== Branches ==
The Nike Art Gallery has branches in Abuja, Oshogbo, Abeokuta and Ogidi.

== Gallery ==
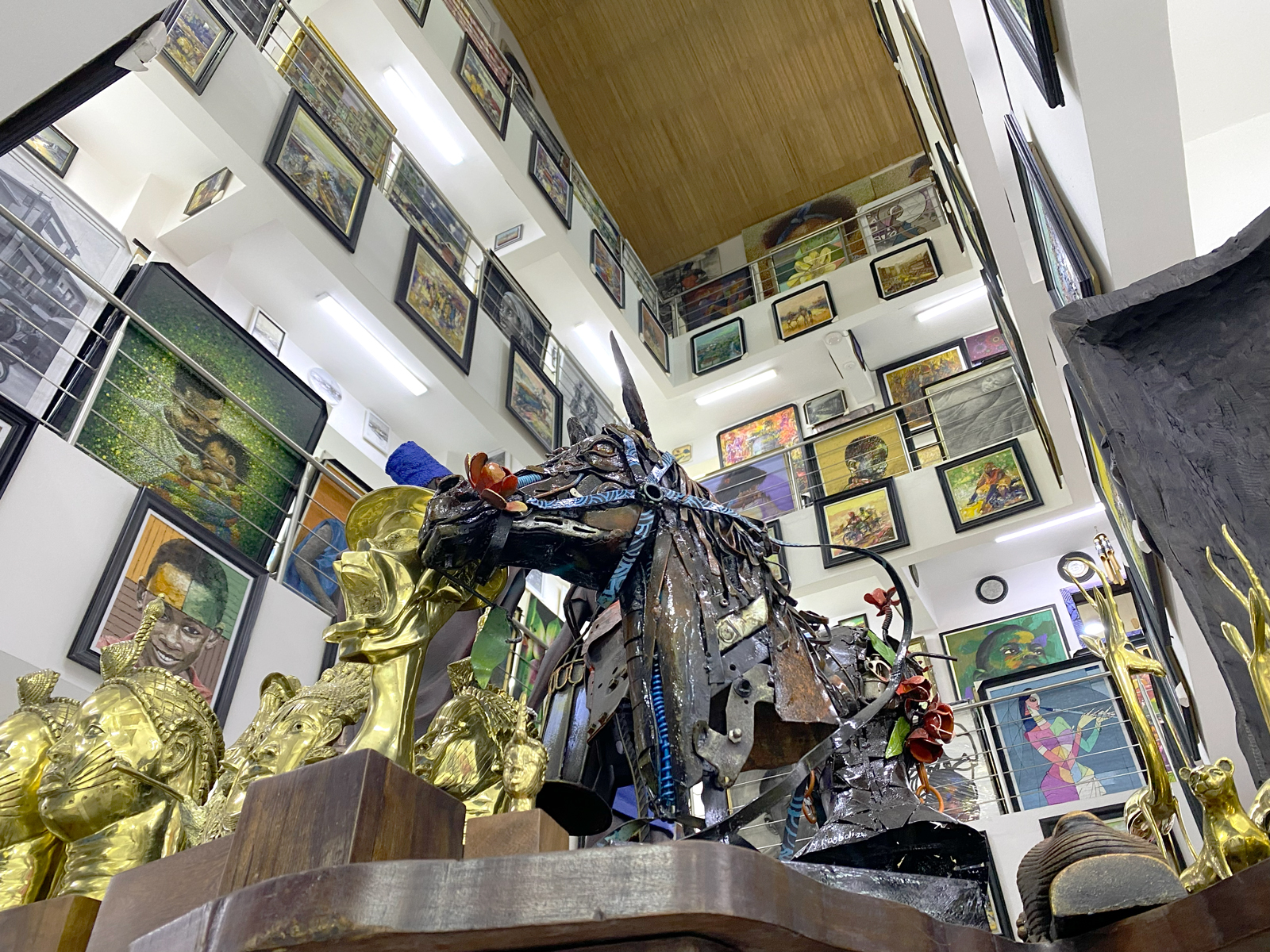
Forum from beneath

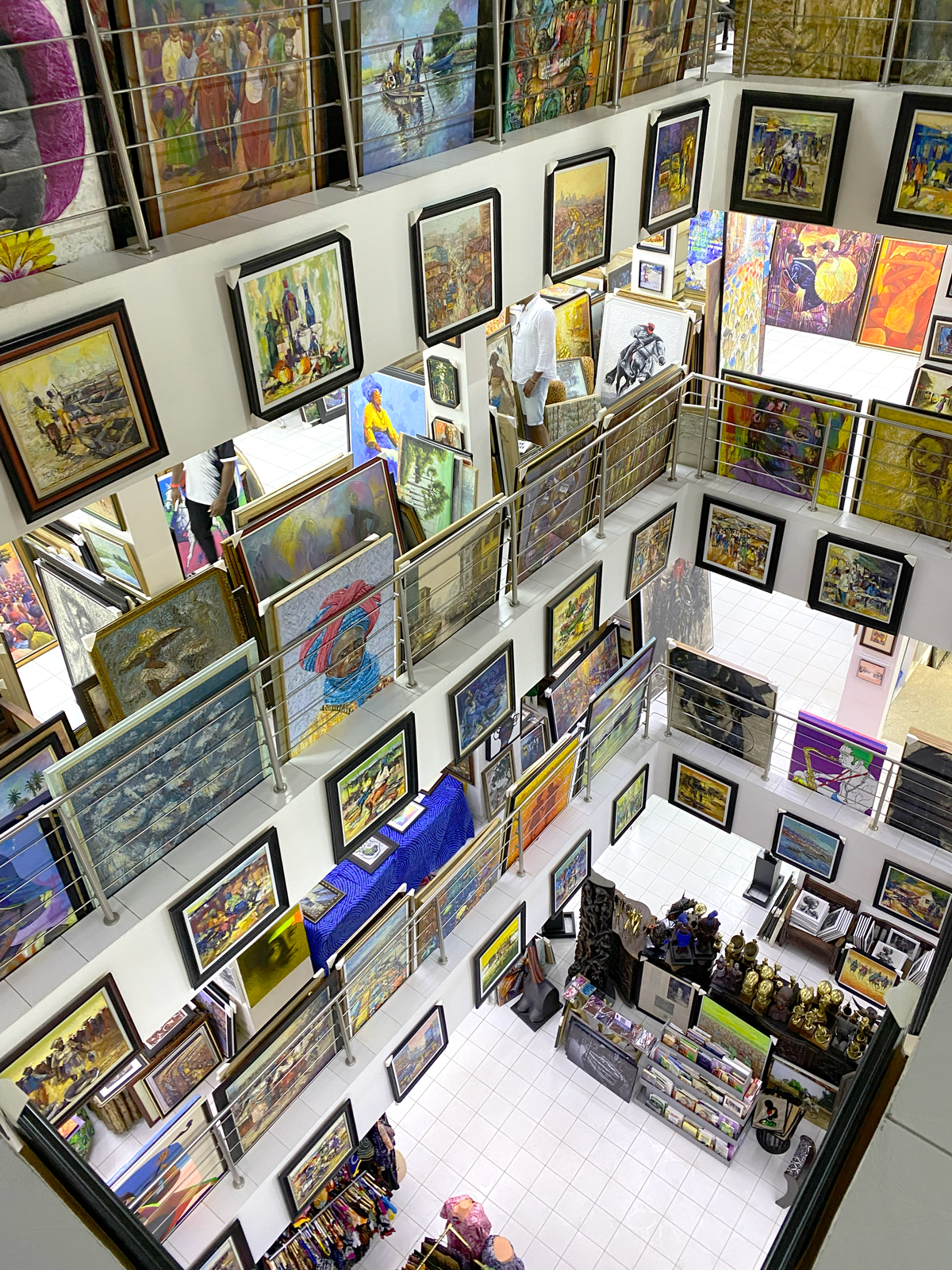
Forum from above

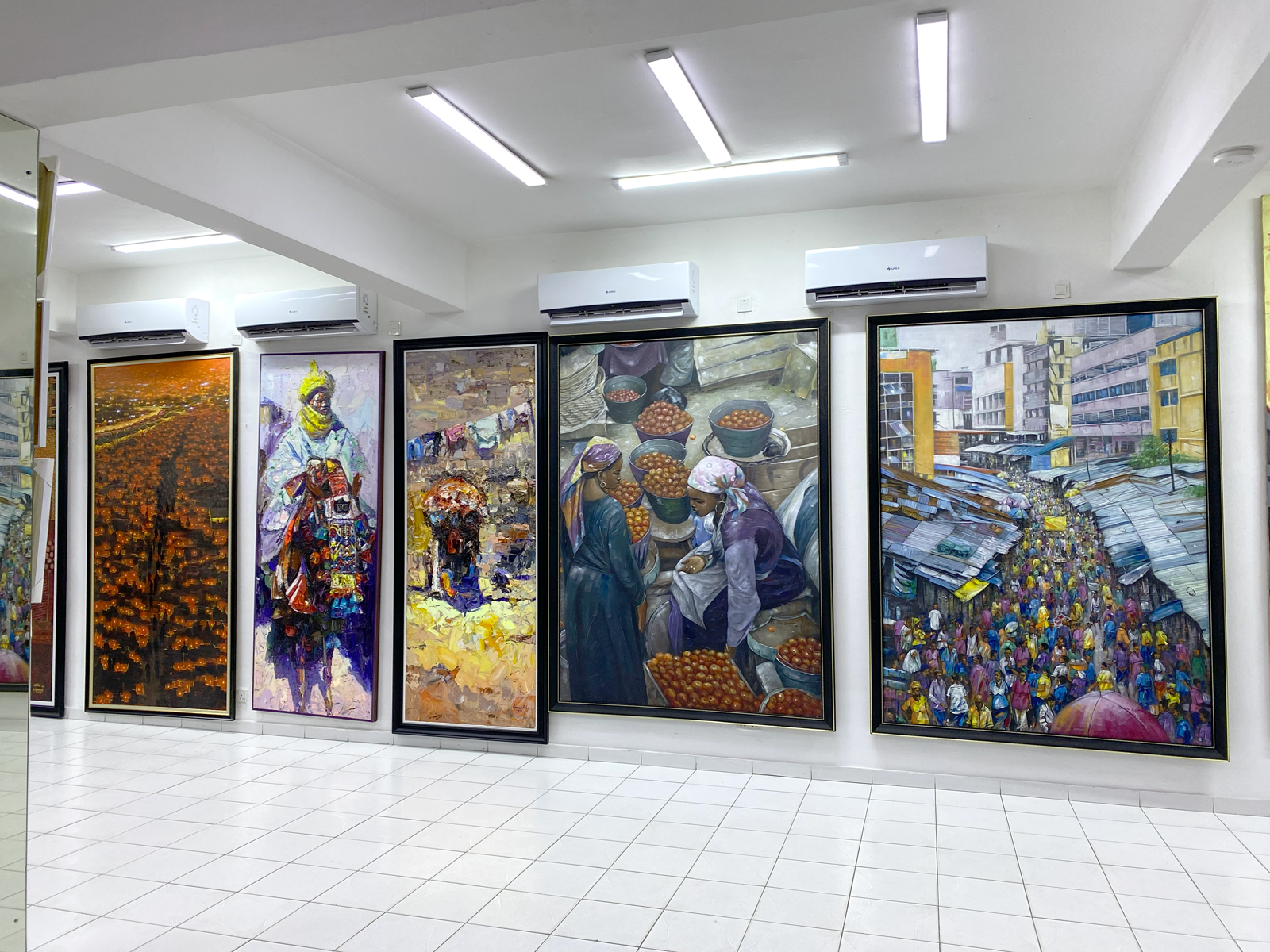
Impressions

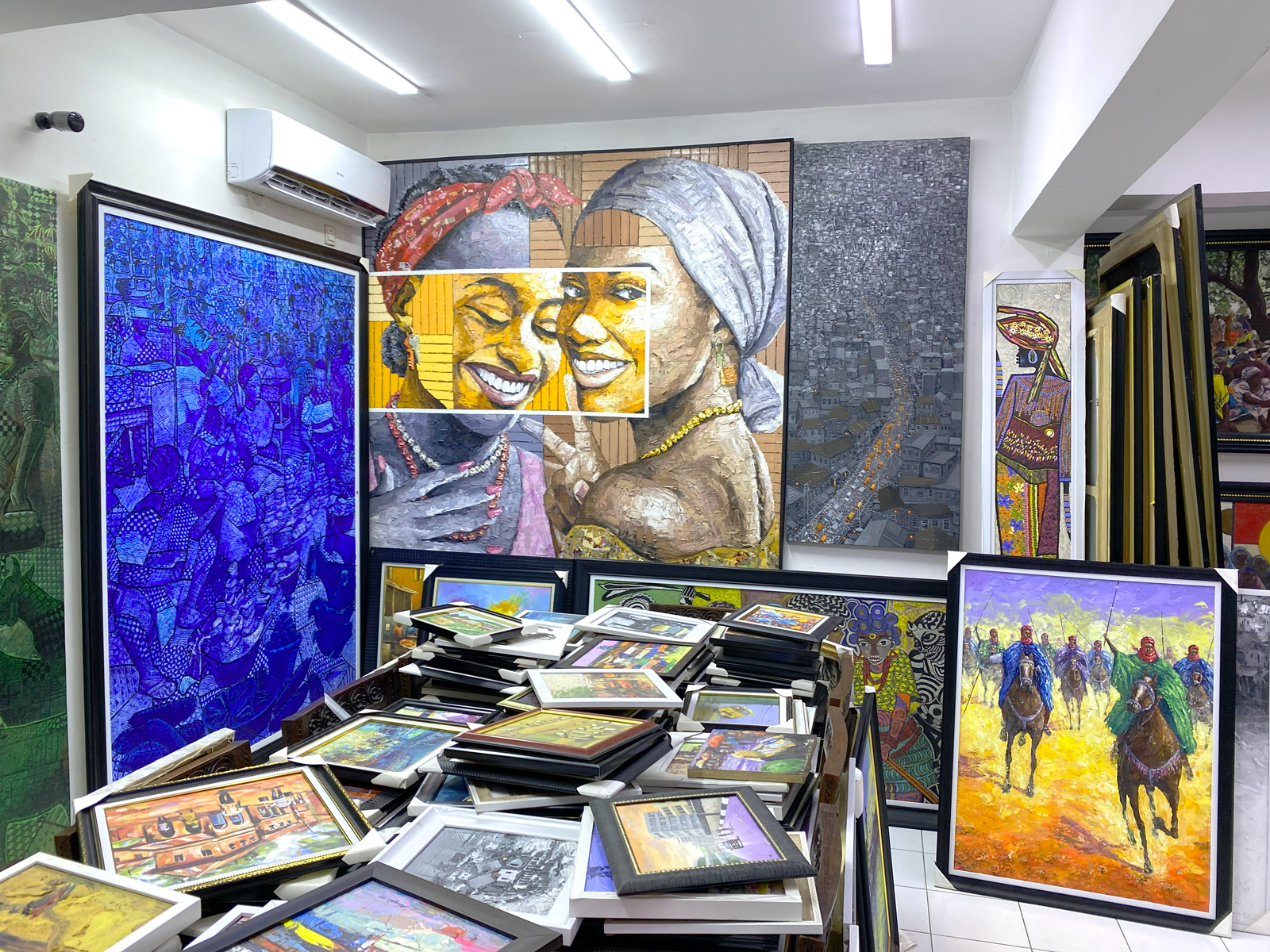
Impressions

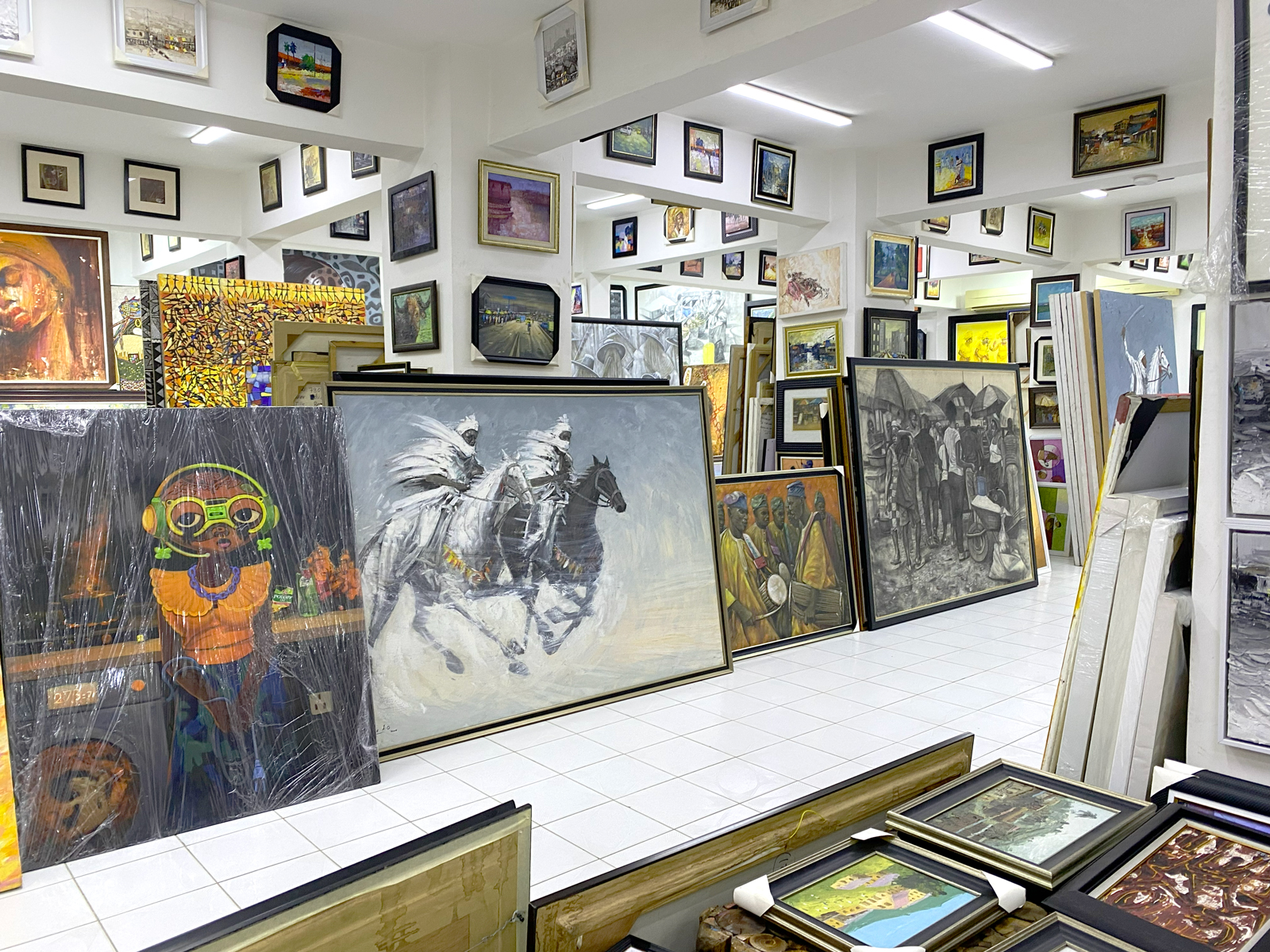
Impressions

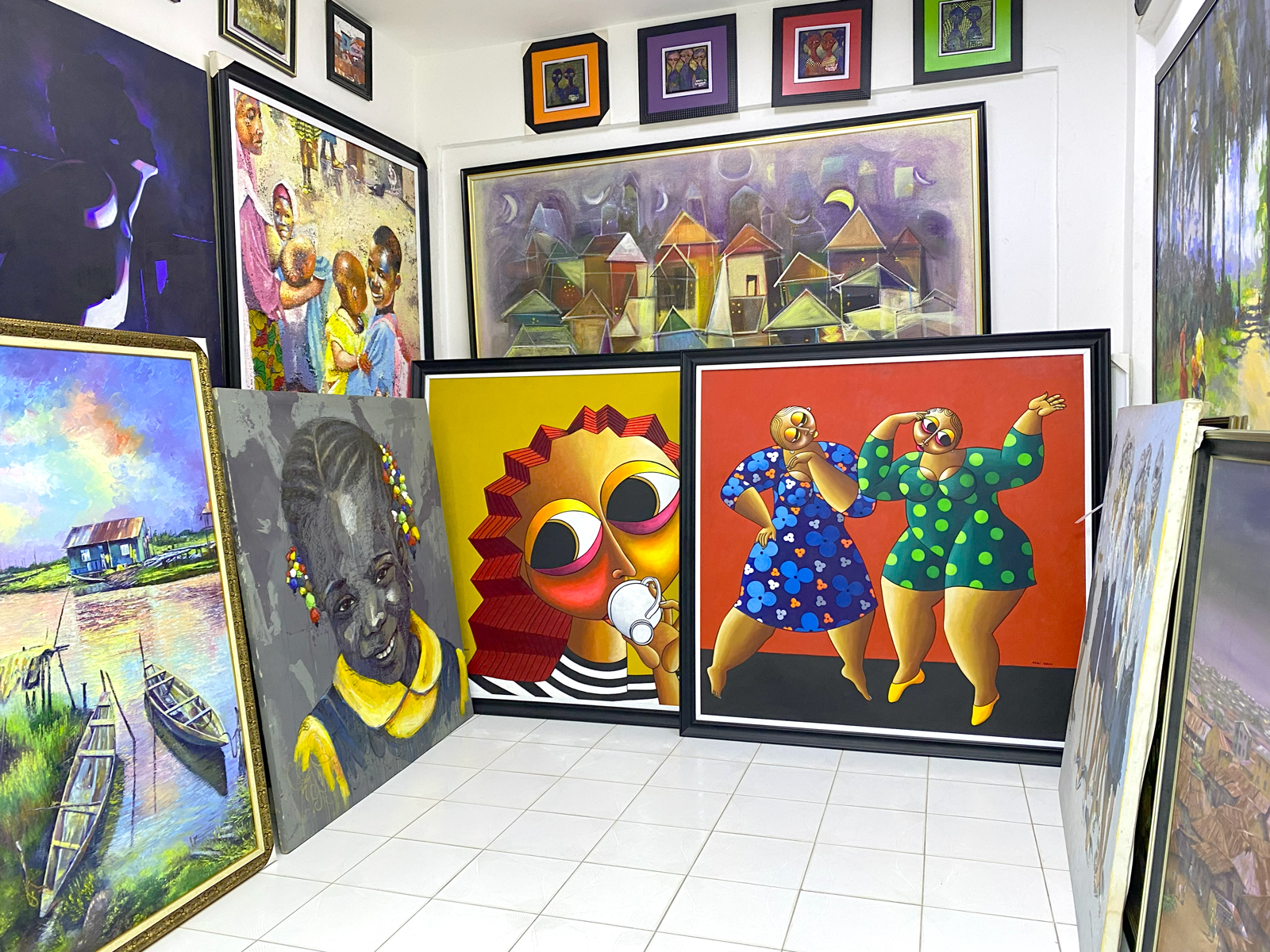
Impressions

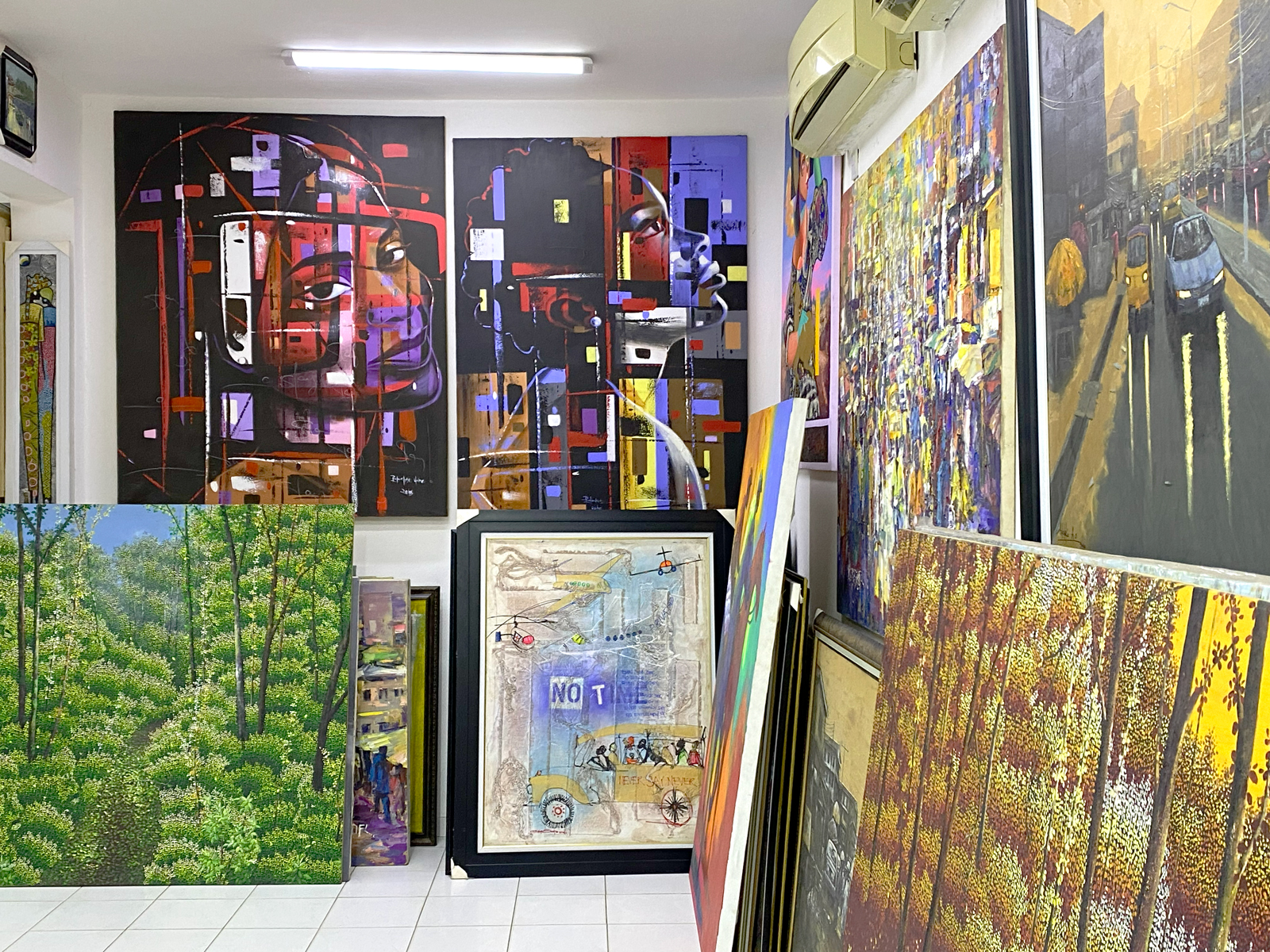
Impressions

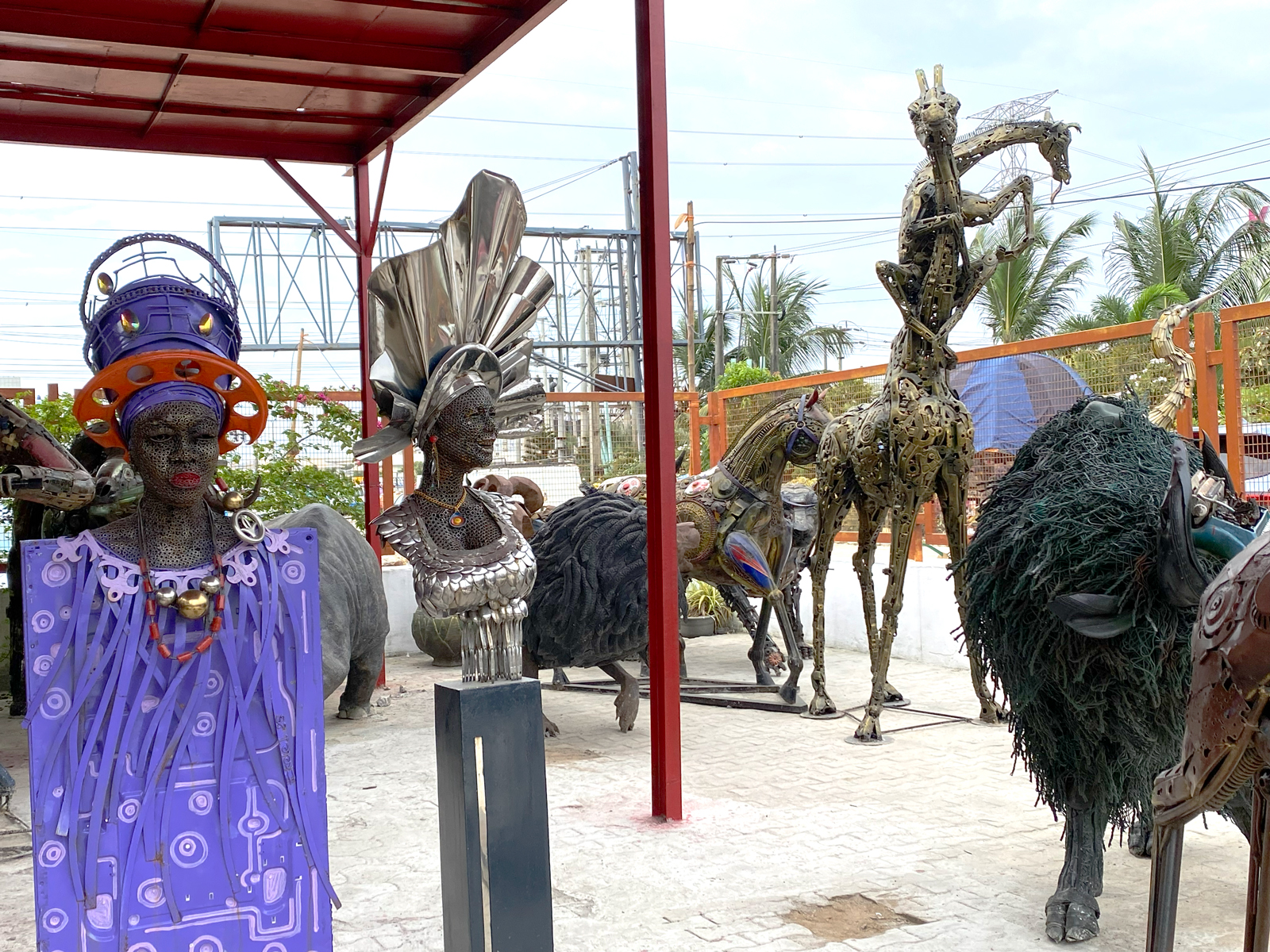
Entrance area

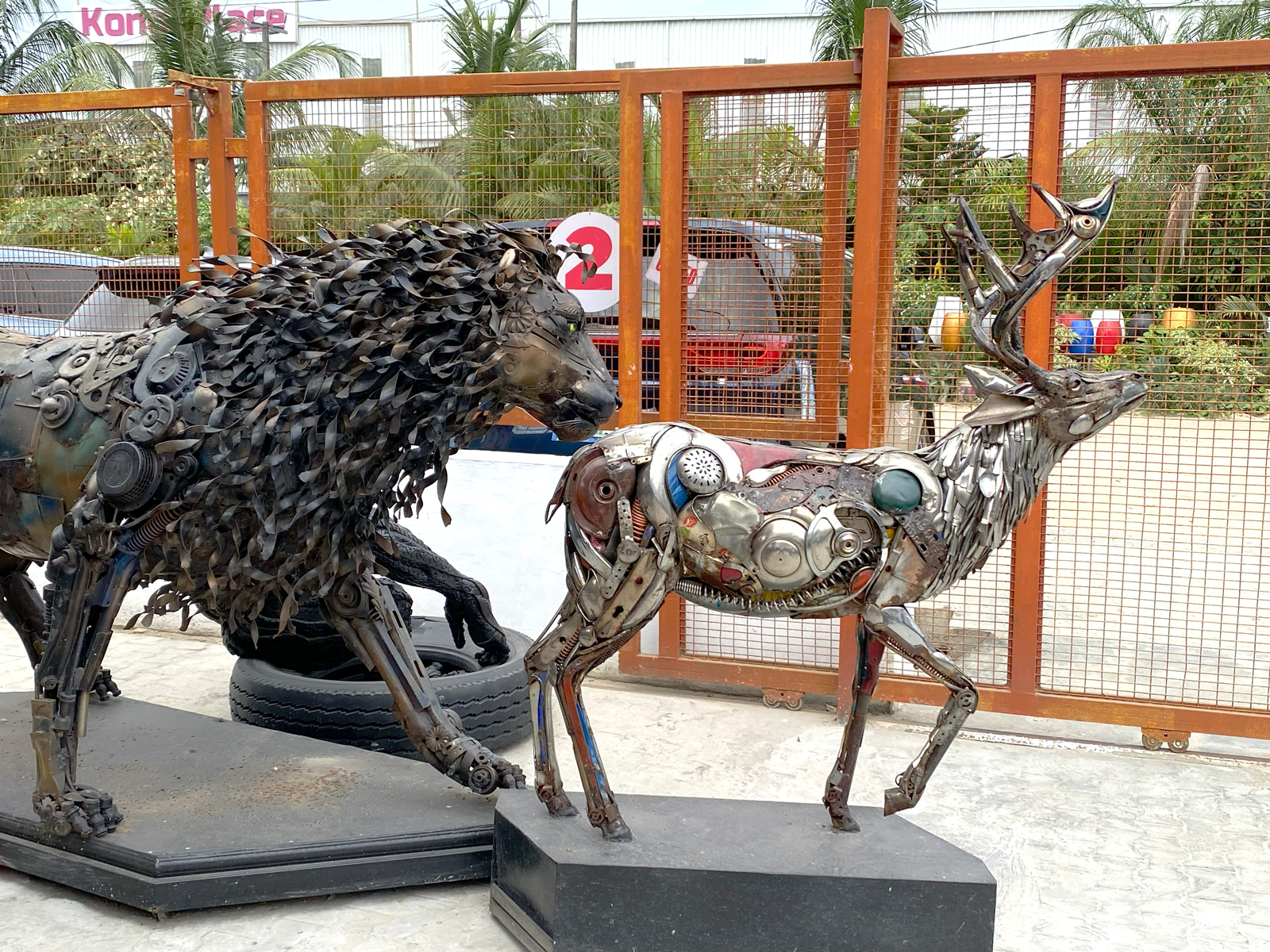
Entrance area

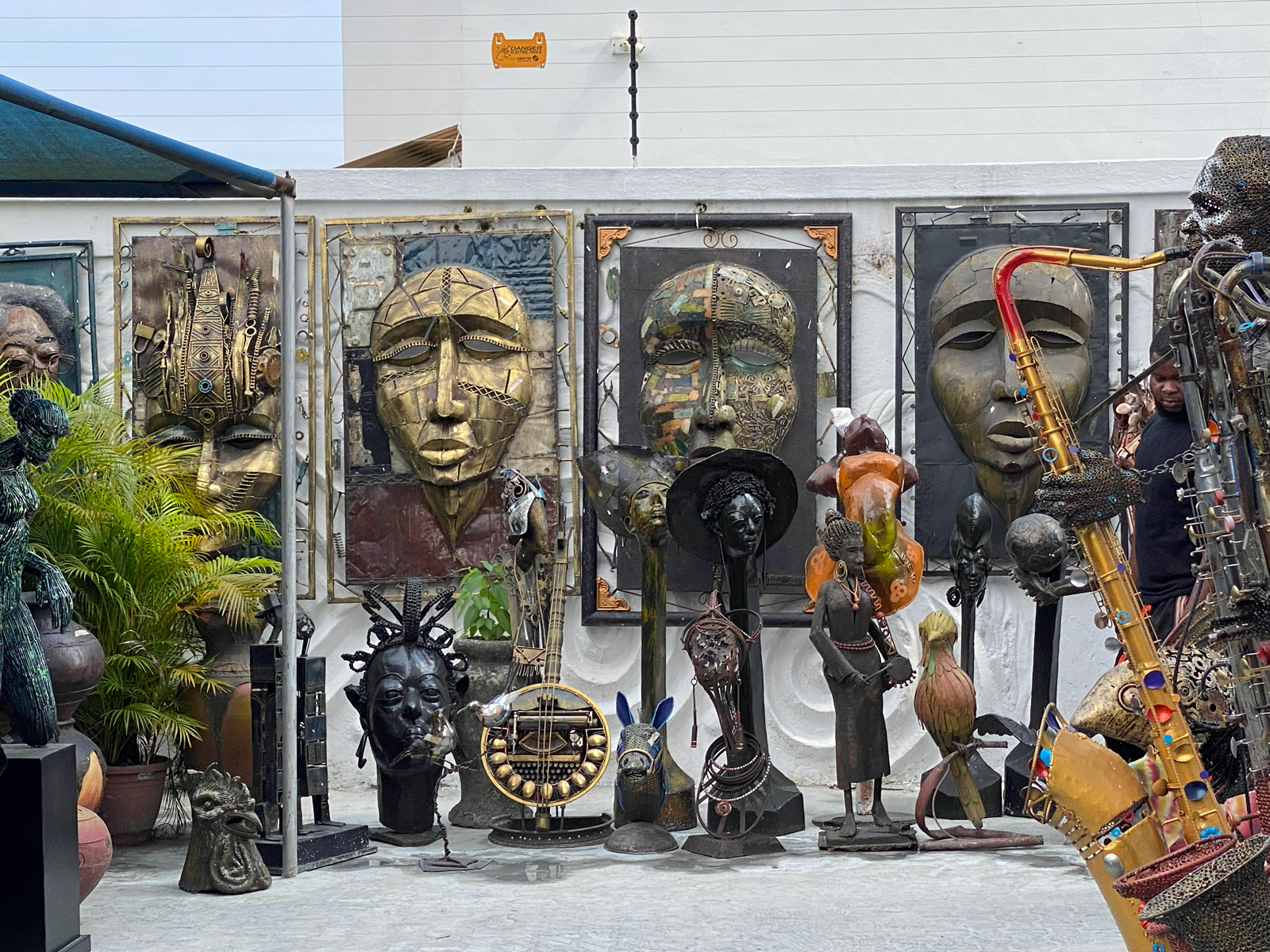
Entrance area

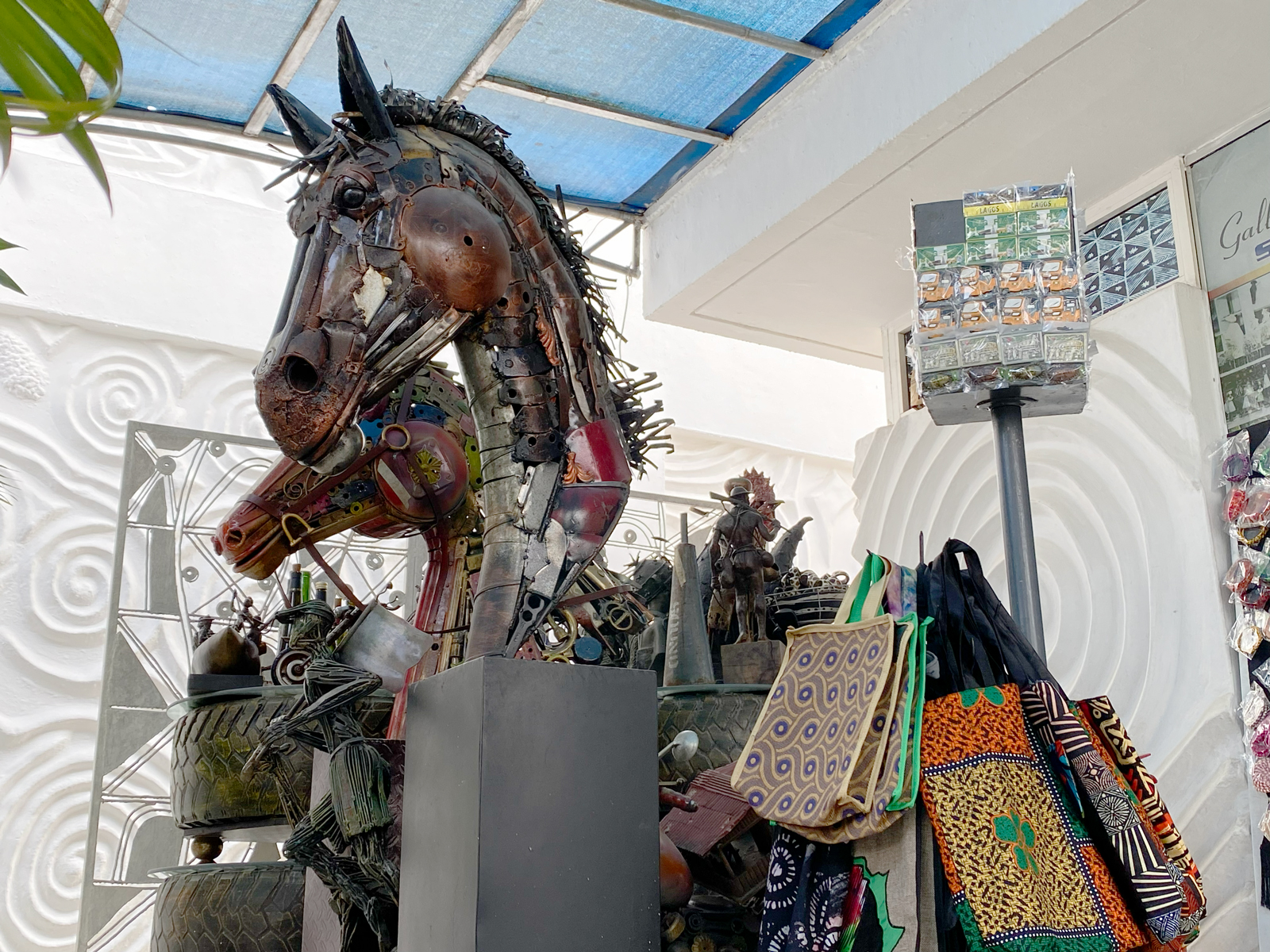
Entrance area

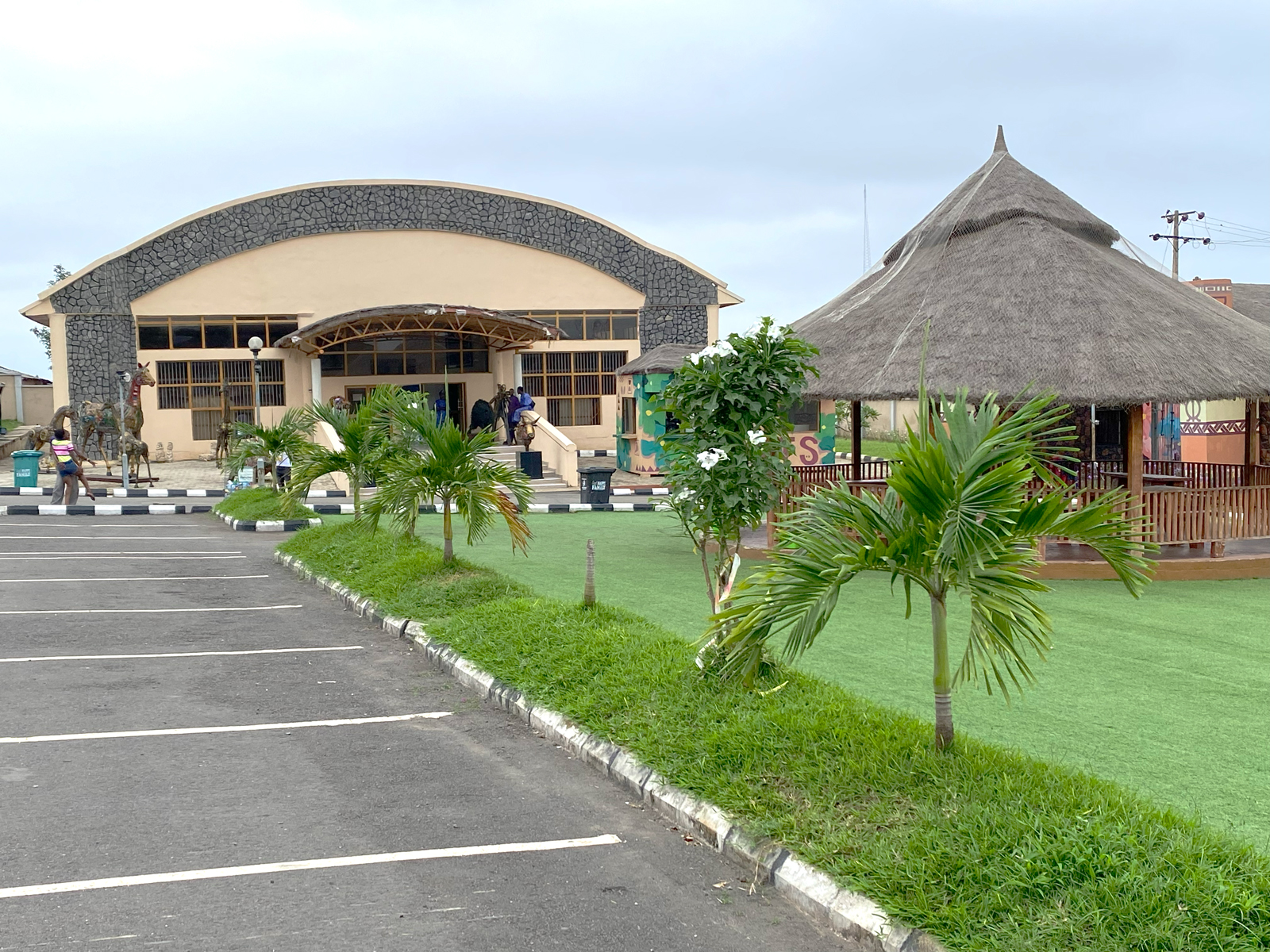
Branch in Abeokuta at Olumo Rock

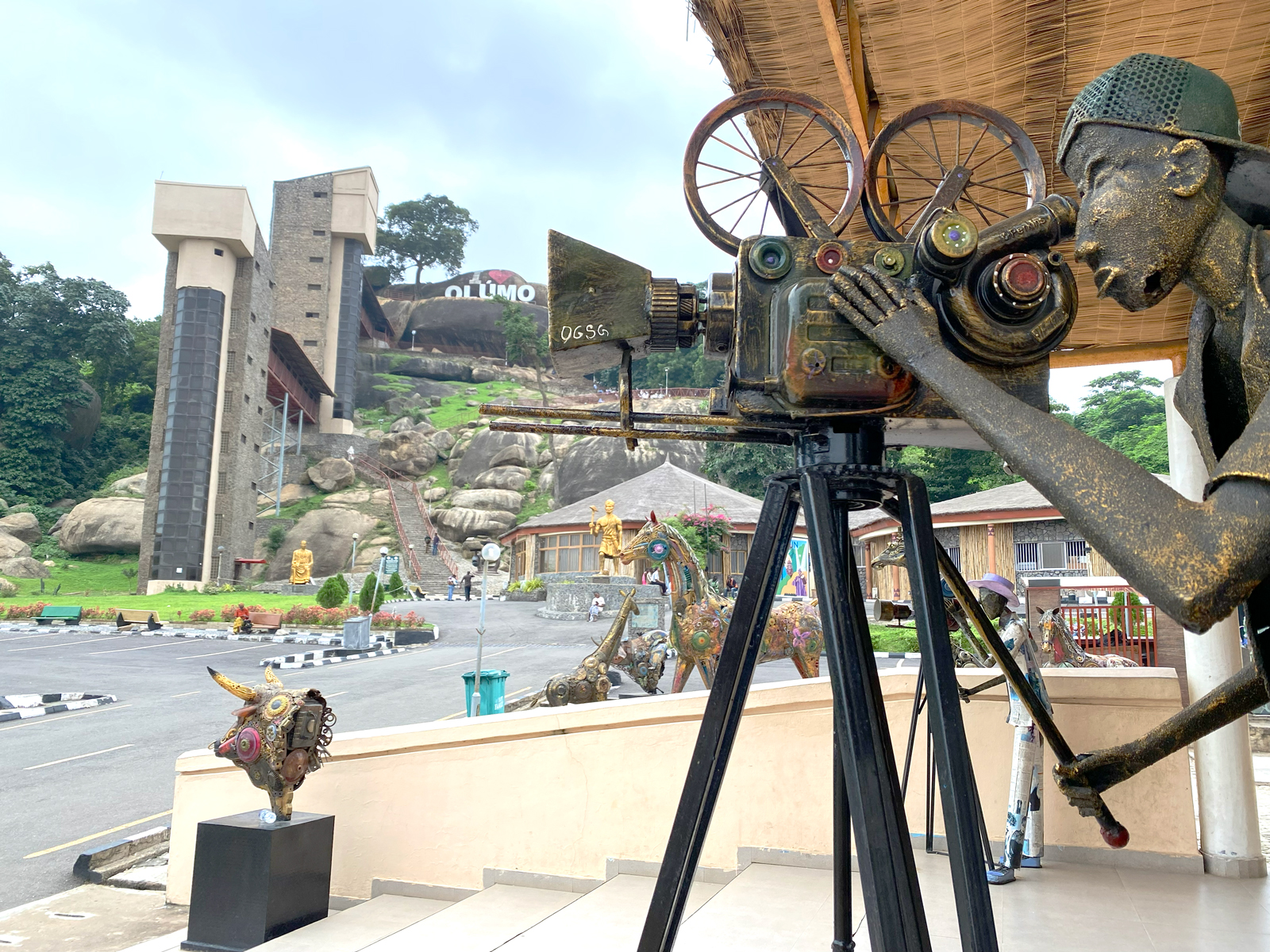
Branch in Abeokuta at Olumo Rock

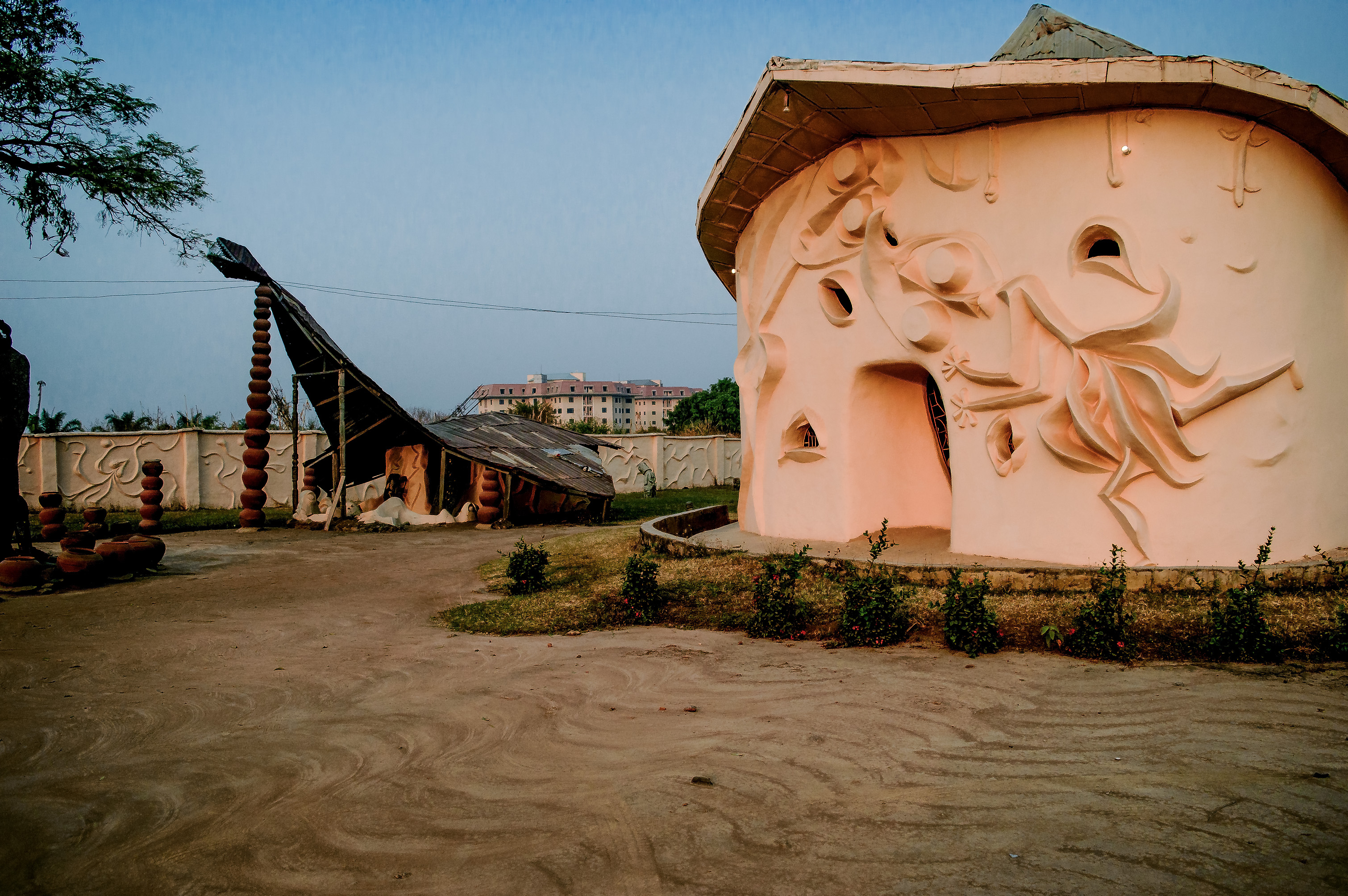
Branch in Abuja
