= Italian International School "Enrico Mattei" =

- Lagos; Nigeria

Information
- Established: 1988; 38 years ago
- Website: https://www.iislagos.com/en/home-page/

Italian International School "Enrico Mattei" (IIS) or the Italian School Lagos is an Italian international school in Lekki Phase I, Lagos, Nigeria. It serves preschool, primary school, lower secondary school, and liceo (upper secondary school).

== History ==
The original Italian education in Lagos began in the 1960s. The school organisation acquired the site for its campus in February 1988. The classroom and office space, built by Italian companies, were completed in January 1991. The athletic facilities opened in May 1992.

== Campus ==
The campus has a total of 1.7 hectares (4.2 acres) of land. The three-story classroom building has air conditioned classrooms, a library, offices, a science laboratory, a computer room, and a music room. The campus also includes a 700-square-metre (7,500 sq ft) air conditioned gymnasium, a football (soccer) field, a playground, a swimming pool, and two tennis courts.
