= Victoria Garden City =

Victoria Garden City VGC
- Residential
- Country: Nigeria
- State: Lagos
- City: Lekki
- LGA: Eti-Osa

Population (2015)
  - Total: 30,000
- Time zone: UTC+1 (WAT)

Victoria Garden City (VGC) is a gated community (estate) off Lekki Epe Express Way, ikota Lekki, Lagos Lekki area, Lagos State. It spans approximately 200 hectares and serves as a residential, commercial and public service area. It is owned and operated by HFP a construction company. It is privately owned with an urban growth rate of between 16% and 18%.

== VGC Management ==
The body that sees to the overall maintenance and management of Victoria Garden City (VGC) is known as the VMMCL (VGC Maintenance and Management Company Limited).
