= Lekki British School =

Information
- Established: 2000; 26 years ago

Lekki British School (LBS) is a British international school in Lekki, Lagos State. It serves preschool, junior school, and high school in its 10-hectare (25-acre) campus. There is a boarding facility for high school students. The school was established in September 2000.

As of 2013, the annual tuition for a day student is 2,911,300 Naira. While the total cost for a boarding student is 4,000,300 Naira; the parents pay $19,500 U.S. dollars and 200,000 Naira. In 2013, Encomium Weekly ranked the school as being among the most expensive secondary schools in Lagos.
