= Lagos Arena =

Indoor arena in Lekki, Nigeria

- Interactive map of Lagos Arena
- Address: Palms Mall, 1 Bisway Street, Maroko; Lekki, Lagos State; Nigeria
- Owner: Tayo Amusan’s Persianas Group and Nigeria Sovereign Investment Authority (40.5%)
- Capacity: 12,000
- Field size: 25,250 m^{2} (271,800 sq ft)

Construction
- Groundbreaking: 24 February 2024
- Opened: December 2027 (proposed)
- Architect: Yazgan Design Architecture

Lagos Arena is an indoor arena under construction in Lekki, Lagos State, Nigeria, that is currently under construction. The arena will have capacity for 12,000 people and will be the largest indoor arena in the country. Ground broke on 24 February 2024 and construction was expected to finish in December 2025. The arena is being built in the Victoria Island neighbourhood and will provide a venue for concerts as well as major sporting events.

== History ==
The $100 million project was first known under the name "Project Arena". The design was made by Turkish architecture firm Yazan Design Architecture and was finished in 2020. Lagos Area is financed by a public–private consortium existing of real estate developer with was led by Tayo Amusan’s Perspectives Corporation and the Nigerian Sovereign Investment Authority, who invested 40.5%. Other investors from the private sector included Adino Capital Ltd., Sports Infrastructure and Entertainment Development Company Ltd. and Persianas Group. Construction began on 24 February 2024 and was announced to be finished in December 2025.

However, as of December 2025, the construction of the Lagos Arena was still at the substructure level, particularly at soil test and piling stage, thereby leading to the best estimated completion and opening time for the Arena being December 2027.
