= Lekki =

- City
- Lekki Peninsula
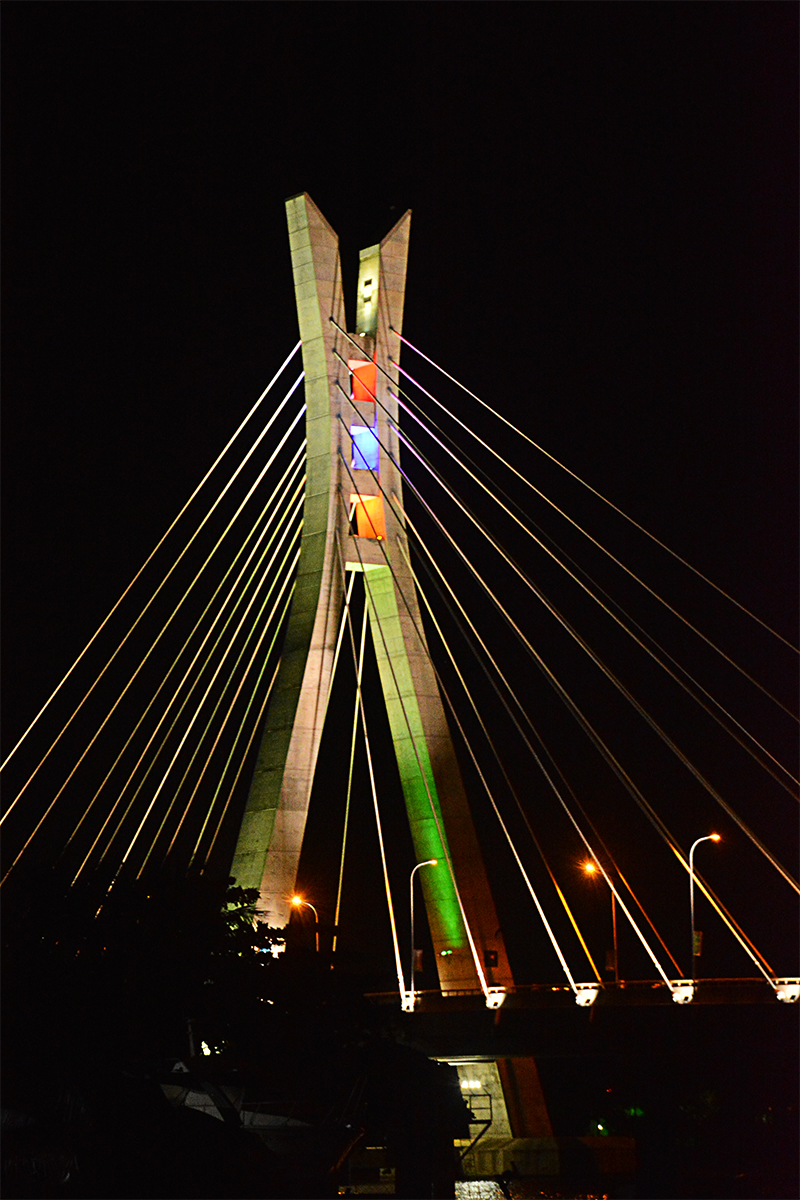

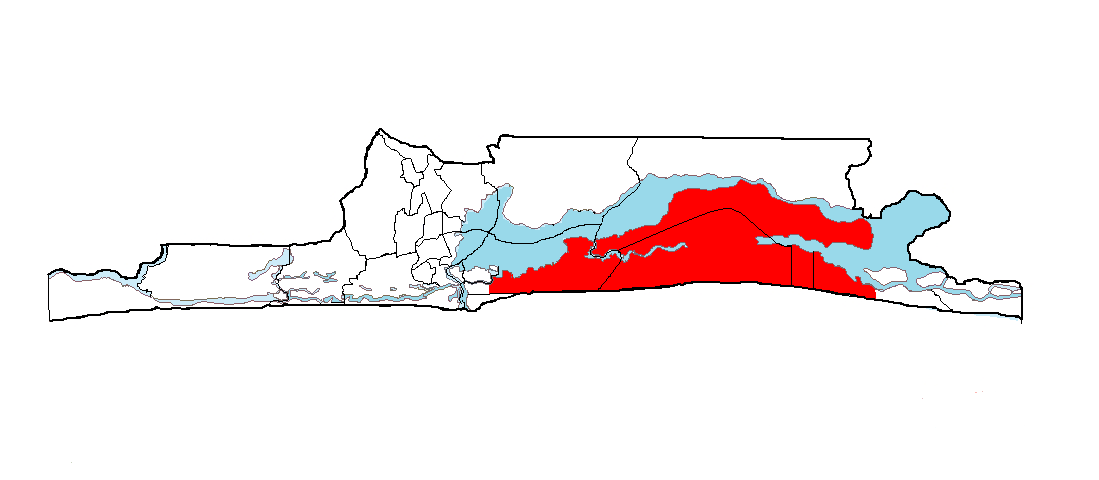
- Lekki shown within the State of Lagos

- Location of Lekki in Nigeria
- Coordinates: 6°29′36″N 3°43′14″E
- Country: Nigeria
- State: Lagos State
- LGA(s): Epe; Eti-Osa (Note: Only Eti-Osa East LCDA); Ibeju-Lekki
- Settled: 15th century
- Established: 2006

Government
  - City Planner: Ministry of Urban Planning and Physical Development
  - Project Chairman: Demola Aladekomo

Area
  - Total: 755 km^{2} (292 sq mi)

Population (2011)
  - Total: 401,272
  - Density: 531.5/km^{2} (1,377/sq mi)
- Time zone: UTC+1 (WAT)
- Area code: 010

Lekki is a city in Lagos State, Nigeria. It is to the southeast of Lagos city proper. Lekki is a naturally formed peninsula, adjoining to its west Victoria Island and Ikoyi districts of Lagos, with the Atlantic Ocean to its south, Lagos Lagoon to the north, and Lekki Lagoon to its east. The city's southeast, which ends around the western edge of Refuge island, adjoins the eastern part of Ibeju-Lekki LGA.

The city is still largely under construction, as of 2015, only phase 1 of the project had been completed, with phase 2 nearing completion. The peninsula is approximately 70 to 80 km long, with an average width of 10 km. Lekki houses several gated residential developments, agricultural farmlands, areas allocated for a Free Trade Zone, with an airport, and a sea port under construction. The proposed land-use master plan for Lekki envisages the Peninsula as a "Blue-Green Environment City", expected to accommodate a residential population of over 3.4 million in addition to a non-residential population of at least 1.9 million.

Part of the Lekki peninsula was formerly known as Maroko, a slum, before it was destroyed by the Raji Rasaki-led Lagos State military government. One of its neighbourhoods, Lekki phase 1, has a reputation of having some of the most expensive real estate in Lagos State.

== History ==
Over 34 years ago, families residing in Maroko, then a suburb of Lagos, faced eviction from their homes, ostensibly to protect them from diseases associated with slum conditions and prevent unnecessary loss of life. Heavily armed soldiers, under the command of Colonel Raji Rasaki and supervised by Military President Ibrahim Badamosi Babangida, carried out the eviction in the early hours of July 14, 1990.

== Economy ==
Masterplan of Lekki

In 2006, the Master Plan of Lekki Free Trade Zone, covering 155 square kilometres at the easternmost end of the peninsula, was initiated and prepared by the Government of Lagos State. The Plan defined the free zone as a special multi-functional economic zone and a new modern city with several south-west and north–south traffic corridors. In 2008, the state Government proposed a blueprint for developing the entire Lekki Peninsula into a "Blue-Green Environment City", which covers an additional 600 square kilometres. The Lekki City plan was prepared by Messrs Dar al Handersah, Shair and Partners, for Lagos State Ministry of Urban Planning and Physical Development.

Based on the proposed land-use plan, Lekki city, excluding the Lekki Free Zone, will be divided into 4 linear development zones: the North Urban Zone, which will be largely residential; the Natural Park Zone, which will consist of an environmental and nature conservation park; the South Urban Zone, which will include existing and new residential developments along with commercial and mixed uses, as well as light industry; and the Atlantic Coastal zone, which will mainly be developed for tourism and recreational activities. The land-use master plan stipulates a total built-up area of about 100 square kilometres, which can accommodate a residential population of about 3.4 million and non-residential population (touristic, hotels, commercial, offices, medical and industrial) of about 1.9 million. Several institutions, estates and new investments are springing up along the Lekki axis, which has been called "the fastest growing corridor in west African sub-region".

=== Dangote Oil Refinery ===
For decades, there was no oil processing industry in Nigeria, apart from illegal refineries in the Niger Delta (which were very polluting due to the lack of cracking). Nigeria therefore had to have the end products of domestic crude oil such as fuels, bitumen, paraffin, motor oil, polypropylene, etc., produced in US or European refineries, with transport costs over thousands of nautical miles and margins for middlemen. The oil refinery in Lekki went into operation in December 2023 and is expected to process 650,000 barrels of oil per day when fully operational, making it the seventh-largest oil refinery in the world. 57,000 people have been hired.

=== Lekki Deep Sea Port ===
At the beginning of 2023, the deep-sea harbour Lekki was put into operation 50 km to the east, but still within the Lagos agglomeration. It can handle super post-Panamax container ships and quintuples Nigeria's harbour capacity.

The container terminal has a 1,200-metre-long quay, three container berths and a storage area with more than 15,000 spaces. The general layout of the container storage and handling area consists of a stacked container arrangement. The terminal is designed to handle 2.5 million twenty-foot standard containers per year. The deep-sea port of Lekki is the first port in Nigeria with ship-to-shore cranes. It has three of these container gantry cranes; they belong to the "Post-Panamax" group and can reach and unload the rearmost row of containers even if the container ship is wider than the Panama Canal (i.e. over 49 metres wide overall). The port's computerised system enables container identification and handling from the office; human interaction will be minimal in the physical processes. Nevertheless, the port will create 169,972 jobs, according to Managing Director Du Ruogang. The additional revenue for the Nigerian state through taxes, duties and licence fees is estimated at US$201 billion.

On 22 January 2023, a few hours before the official inauguration by President Buhari, the first commercial ship, the container freighter CMA CGM MOZART, docked in the port.

=== Lekki Free Trade Zone ===
Detailed plan for the Lekki Free Trade Zone

Lekki Free Trade Zone (Lekki FTZ) is a free zone situated at the eastern part of Lekki, which covers about 155 square kilometres. The first phase of the zone has an area of 30 square kilometres, with about 27 square kilometres for urban construction purposes, which would accommodate a total resident population of 120,000. According to the Master Plan, the free zone will be developed into a new modern city within a city with integration of industries, commerce and business, real estate development, warehousing and logistics, tourism, and entertainment.

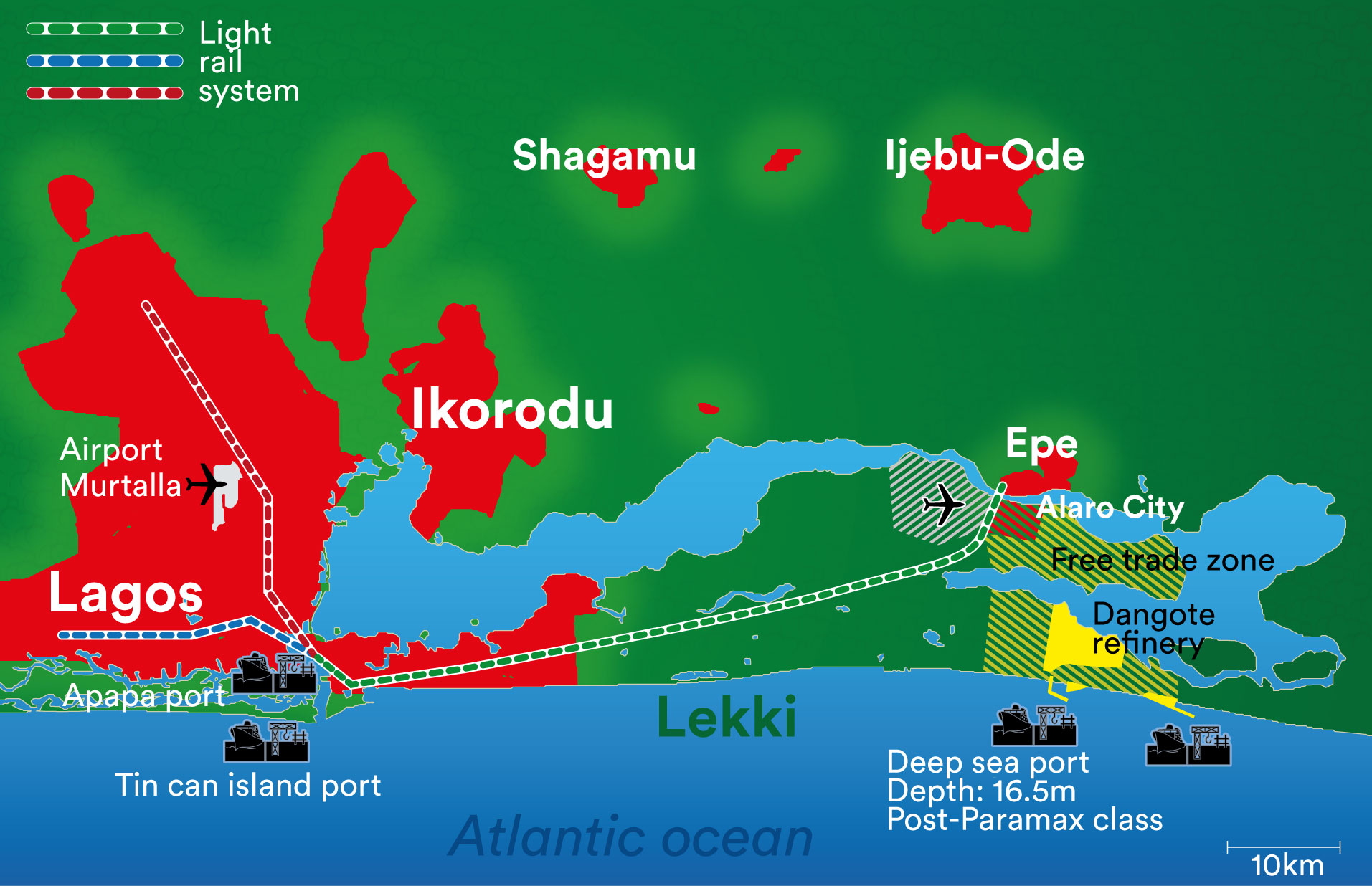
Yellow hatched: Lekki Free Trade Zone, grey hatched: new airport Lagos, yellow: Dangote refinery

Lekki FTZ is divided into three functional districts; the residential district in the north, industrial district in the middle and commercial trading/warehousing & logistics district in the southeast. The "sub-centre" located in the south of the Zone is to be developed first. The region is close to the customs supervisory area, and it is mainly for commercial trading, logistics and warehousing operations. The second phase is located in the north of the Zone adjacent to E9 Road (Highway) which will serve as central business district of the free zone. The area along E2 Road will be developed for financial and commercial businesses, estate properties & supporting facilities, high-end production service industries and so on, which will link it to the sub-centre the Zone. The area along E4 Road will be utilized mainly for the development of logistics and industrial manufacturing/processing. A number of connection axes are also planned in-between the principal axis and the sub-axis, with multi-functional service nodes to serve the whole of Lekki FTZ. Dangote Refinery is currently being built in the Lekki Free Zone.

In the start-up area of the Lekki Free Trade Zone, there will be a Commercial & Logistics Park which will cover a total area of 1.5 square kilometres. The Park was planned to be multi-functional with the integration of commerce, trading, warehousing, and exhibition. According to the Site Plan of the park, large construction works will be built in the park, including the "international commodities & trade centre", the "international exhibition & conversation centre", industrial factory workshops, logistics warehouses, office buildings, hotels and residential apartment buildings, amongst others.

== Culture ==
=== Lekki Conservation Centre ===
Lekki Conservation Centre (LCC) is one of the major Nigerian Conservation Foundation (NCF) conservation sites. It covers a land area of 78 hectares in Lekki. The Conservation Centre was established in the 1990, before the development of Lekki, for the conservation of wildlife found in southwest coastal environment of Nigeria, in the face of sprawling urban development. The project has promoted environmental protection and worked against poaching by surrounding communities as well as serve as a tourist centre for local and international visitors.

Over two million tourists from more than 100 nations have visited Lekki Conservation Centre since its establishment. Most of NCF's School Conservation Clubs were established following the impact of individual visits to the centre. LCC land area is divided into two sections: the LCC Complex and the nature reserve. The LCC Complex comprises a multi-purpose rotunda surrounded by four office blocks, containing project staff offices, a gift shop, a canteen, and the drivers' office. The nature reserve consists of a mosaic of vegetation types, which includes: secondary forest, swamp forest, and savanna grassland.

=== Nike Art Gallery ===
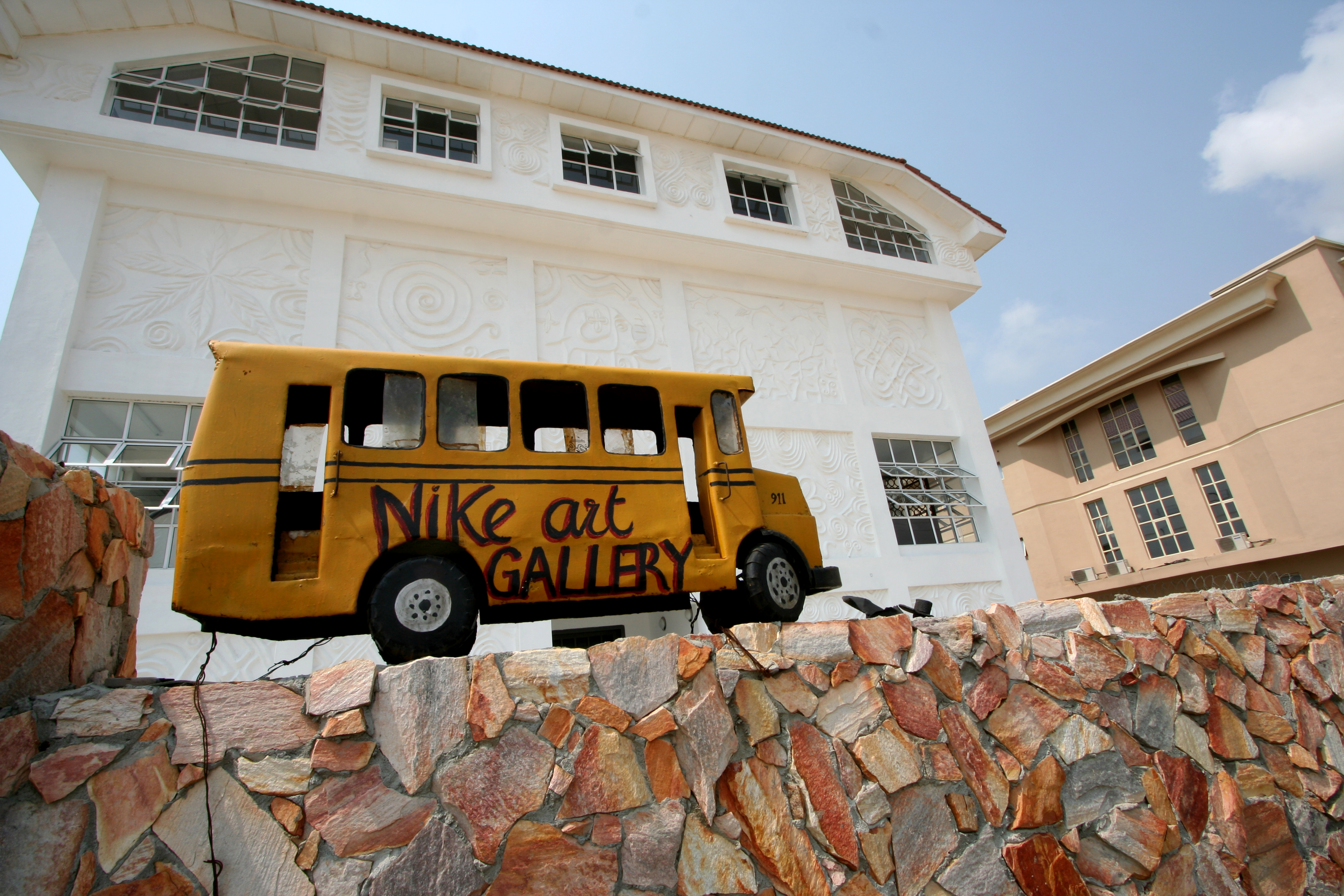
The Nike Art Gallery

The Nike Art Gallery is an art gallery in Lagos owned by Nike Davies-Okundaye. The gallery is probably the largest of its kind in West Africa. It is housed in a five-storey building and has a collection of about 8,000 different works of art by various Nigerian artists such as Chief Josephine Oboh Macleod. The gallery is the most popular tourist destination in the city and has nothing to do with the sporting goods manufacturer of the same name.

=== Oba Elegushi Market ===
The Lekki Arts and Crafts Market (known to Lagosians as Oba Elegushi Market) offers a wide variety of African arts and crafts. It is considered the largest art market in Nigeria.

== Buildings ==
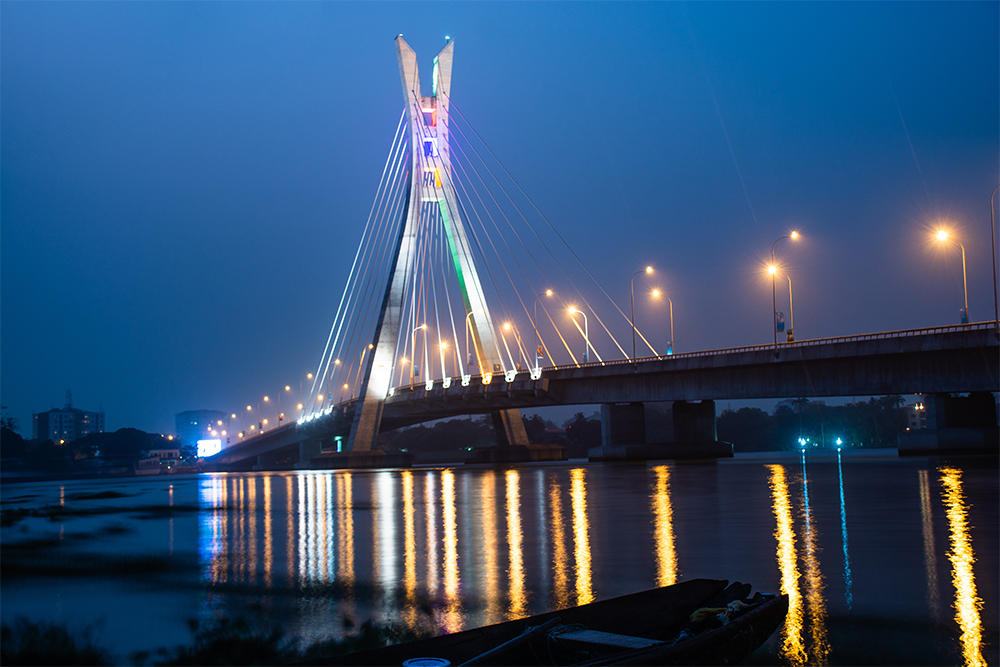
Lekki bridge

A frequently photographed structure in Lagos is the Lekki-Ikoyi-Bridge, which was completed in 2013. Mark Zuckerberg has already jogged across it.

The 12,000-seater indoor arena Lagos Arena is currently being built in Lekki, with construction commencing in February 2024 and expected to finish in December 2025.

== Climate ==
In Lekki, there are 104 rainy days, the total rainfall is 1,699 millimetres (66.9 inches) per year. Wind speed is 3 metres per second (6.7 miles per hour; 9.8 feet per second).

== Education ==
Lekki British School, a British international school, is in Lekki.

The American International School of Lagos maintains the Lekki Campus.

The Italian International School "Enrico Mattei" has its campus in Lekki.

The Pan-Atlantic University, formerly Lagos Business School, is in Lekki.

== Notable neighbourhoods ==
- Ajah
- Ikota
- Ikate-Elegushi
- Jakande
- Lekki Phase 1
- Igbo-Efon
- Idado
- Chevron
- Victoria Garden City
- Osapa
- Agungi
- Lekki palm city

== Transport ==
The proposed Lekki-Epe International Airport would serve the area as a second airport for Lagos, and the Green Line of the future Lagos Rail Mass Transit will connect Lekki with Lagos city.

== Notable residents ==
- Alibaba Akpobome
- 2Baba
- Funke Akindele
- Bobrisky

== Major business precincts ==
1. Shoprite Lekki Mall
2. Spar
3. Chevron Drive
4. Ajah Market
5. Ikota Complex
6. Torrent Technologies Ltd
7. CitrinePurple Recruitment

== Tourist attractions ==
Lekki is a peninsula, bordered in the south by the Atlantic Ocean and in the North by the Lagos Lagoon. The main attractions are its numerous beaches and bustling night life.

Some tourist attractions are:

- Lekki Conservation Centre
- Nike Art Gallery

== Places of worship ==
1. House on the Rock (church)

2. The Elevation Church

3. This Present House (TPH)

4. RCCG, Tabernacle of David

5. Lekki Central Mosque.

6. Foursquare Gospel Church

== Gallery ==
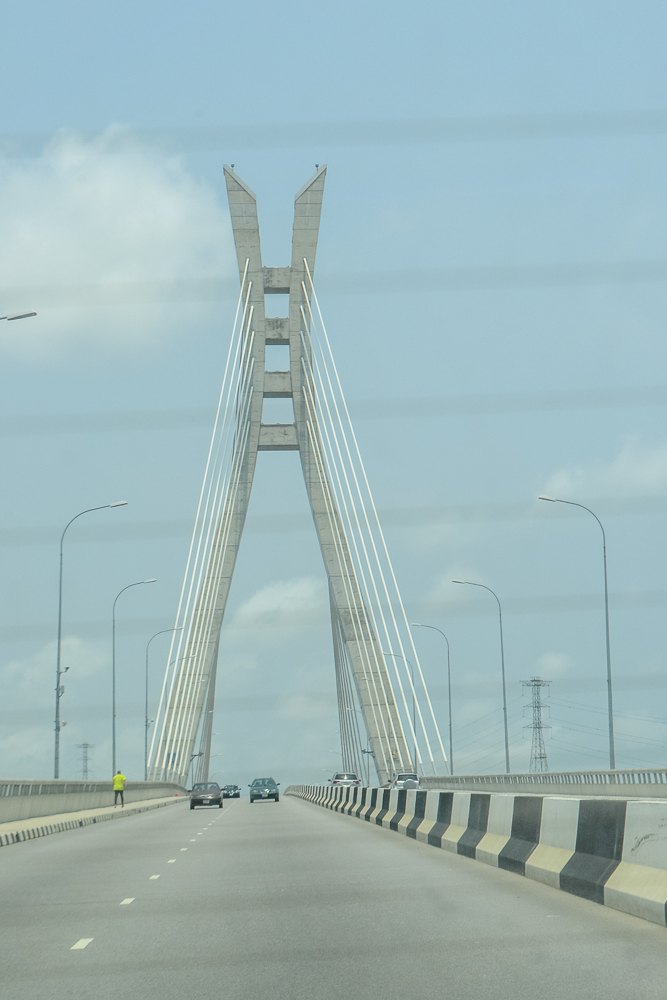
Lekki-Ikoyi Link Bridge

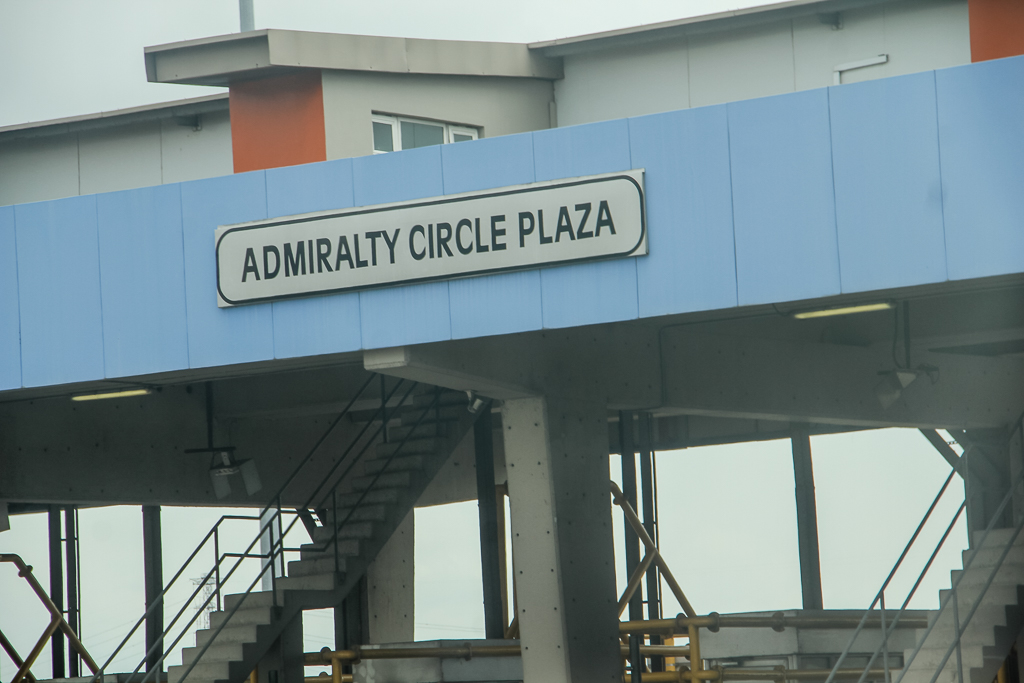
Lekki Toll Gate

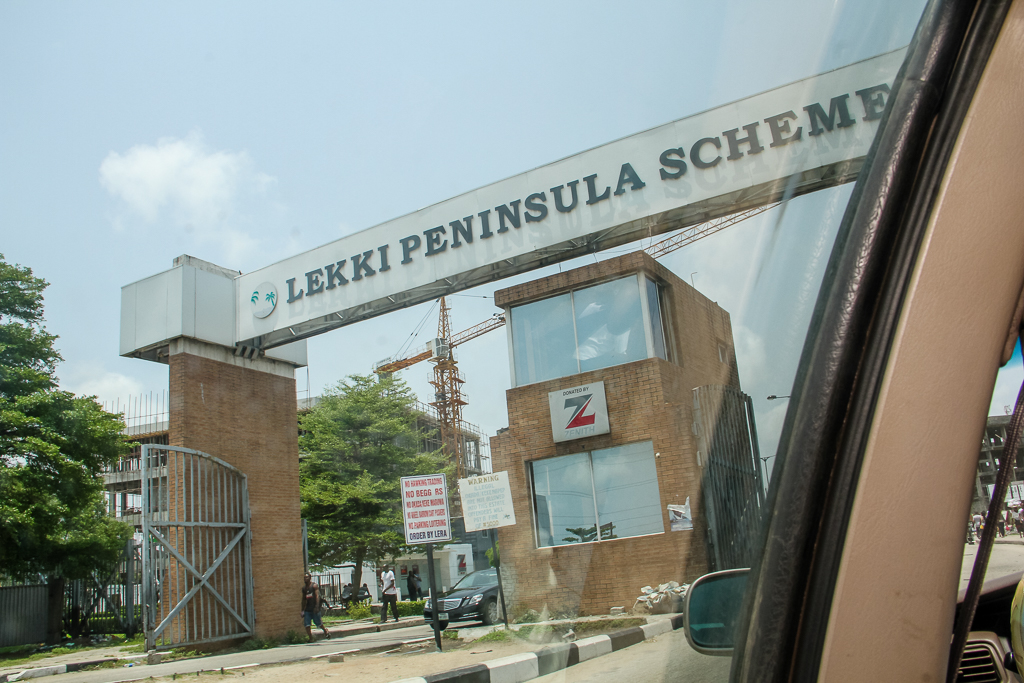
Lekki Peninsula

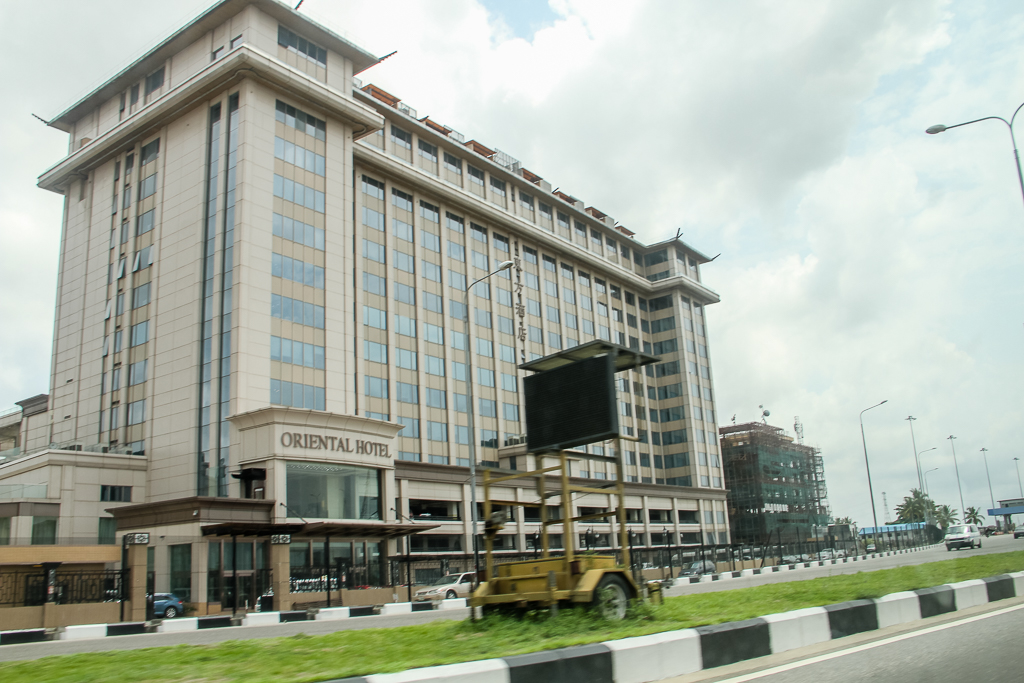
Oriental Hotel

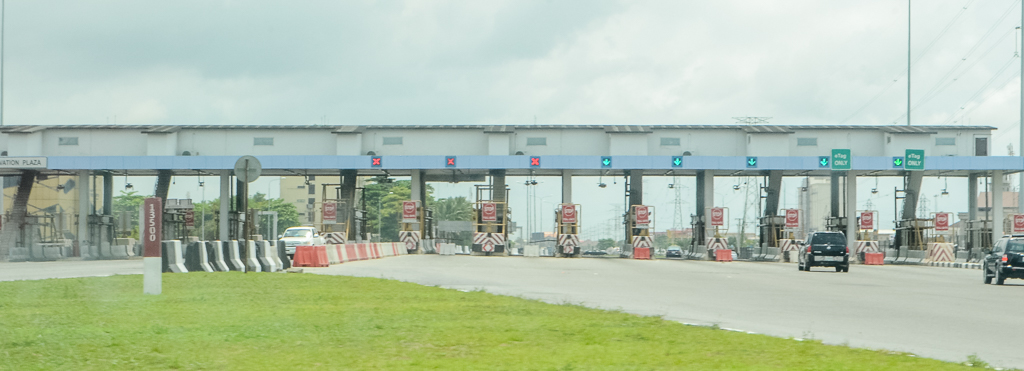
2nd Toll Gate at Lekki

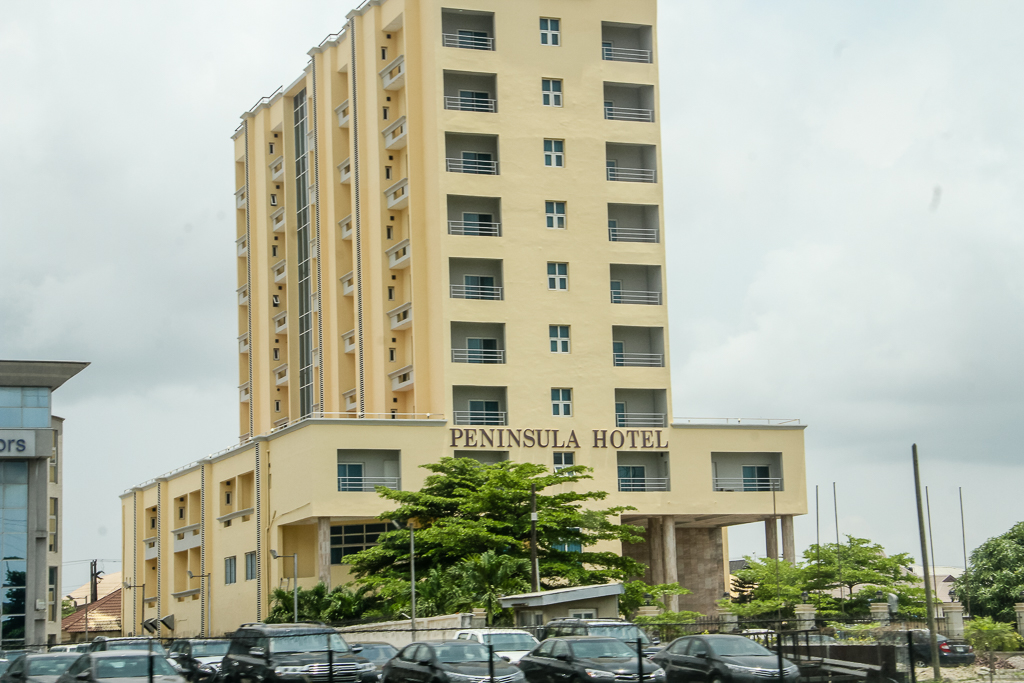
Peninsula Hotel

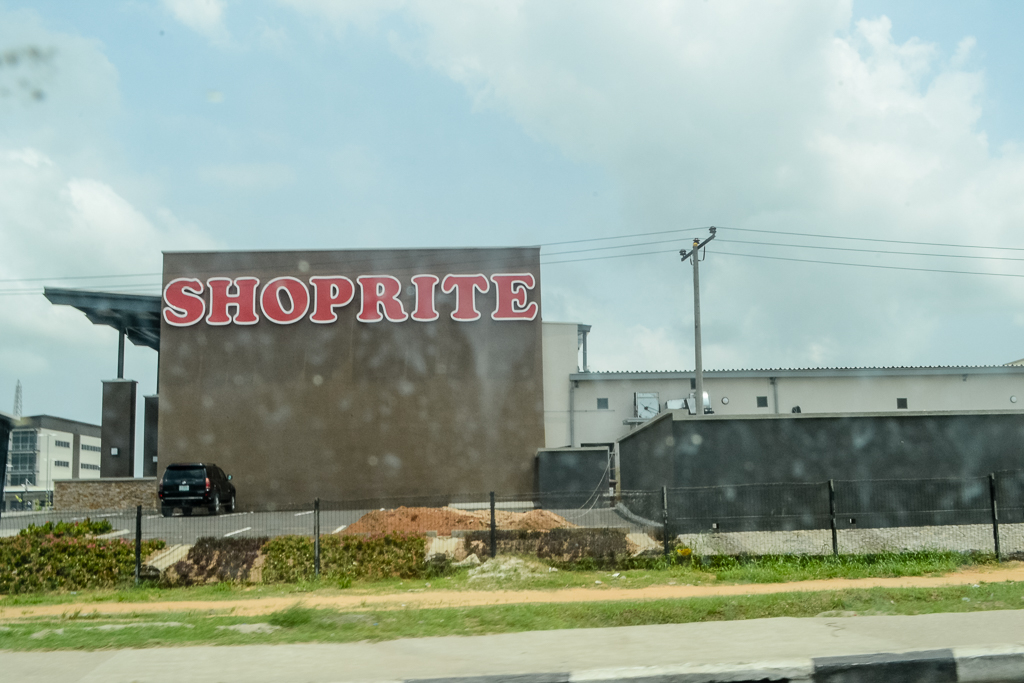
Shoprite at Lekki

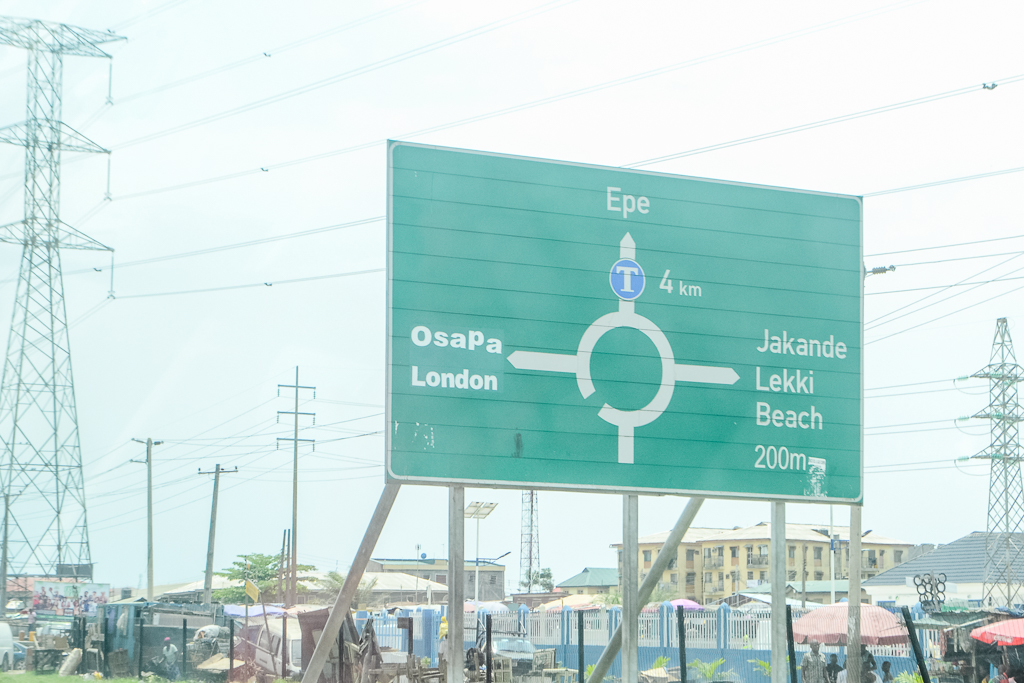
Road Directional Sign at Lekki

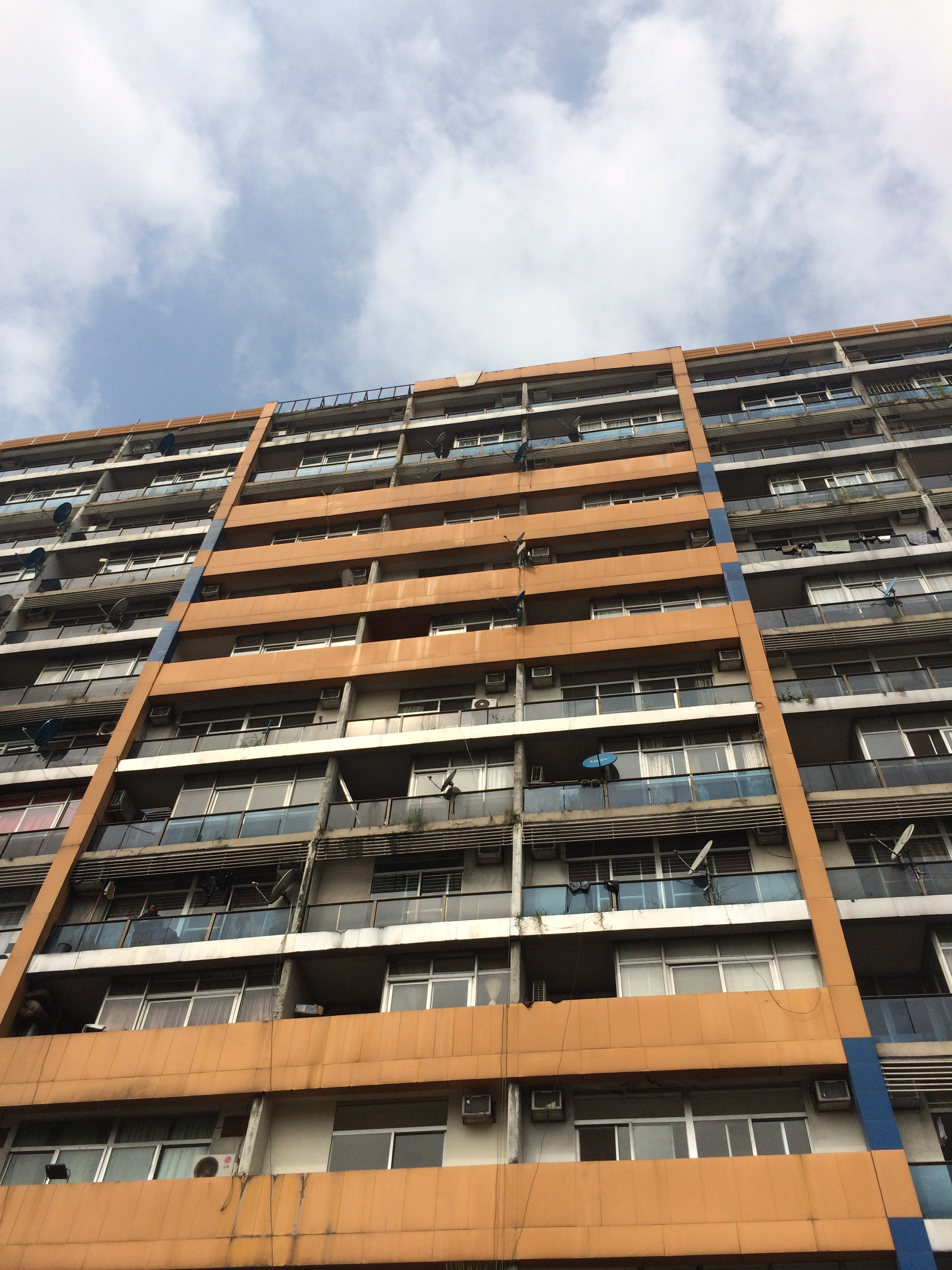
1004 building, lekki road

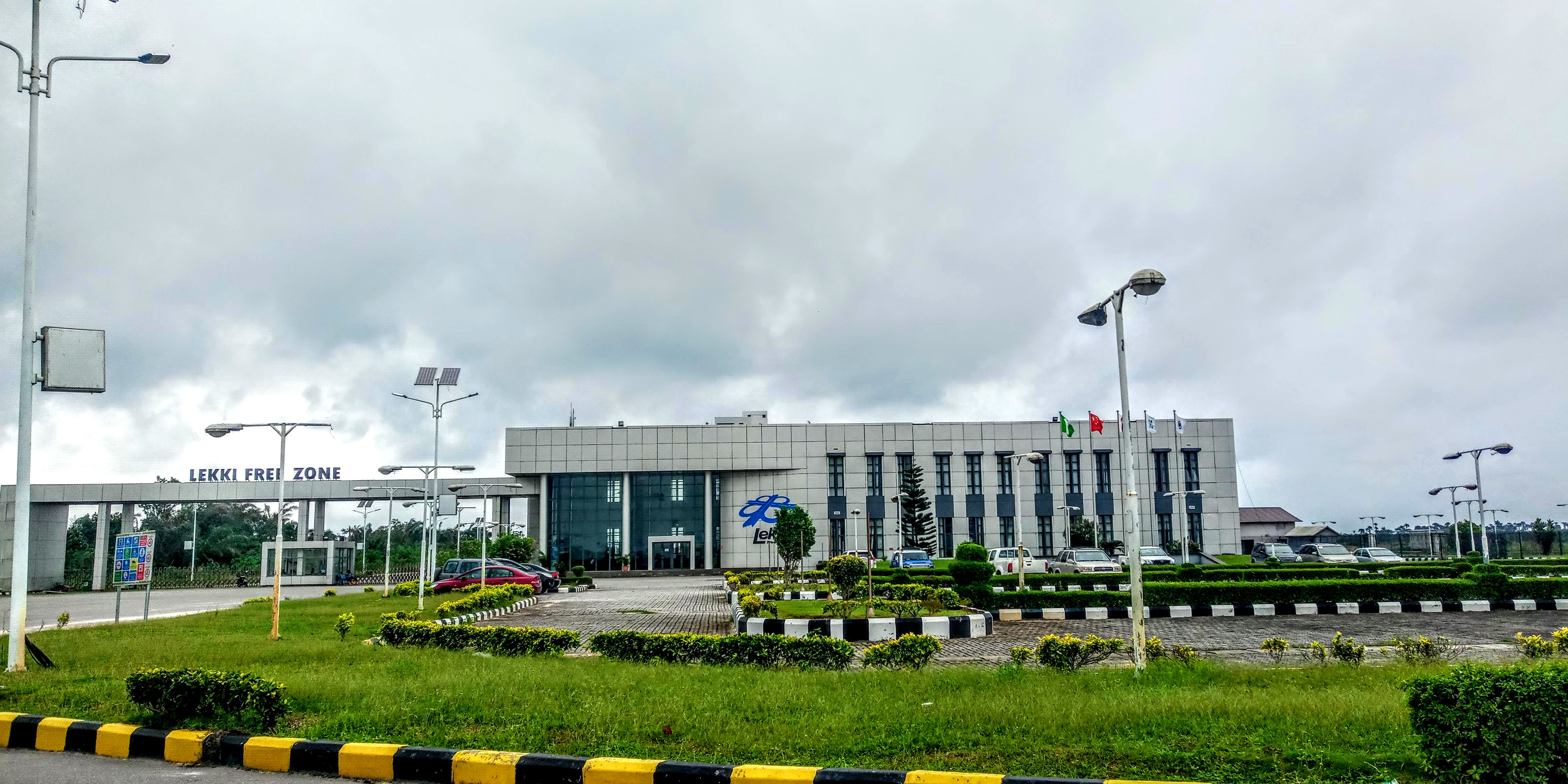
lekki free trade zone

== See also ==
- Centenary City
- Eko Atlantic
