= Nigerian Conservation Foundation =

Nigerian environmental non-governmental organization

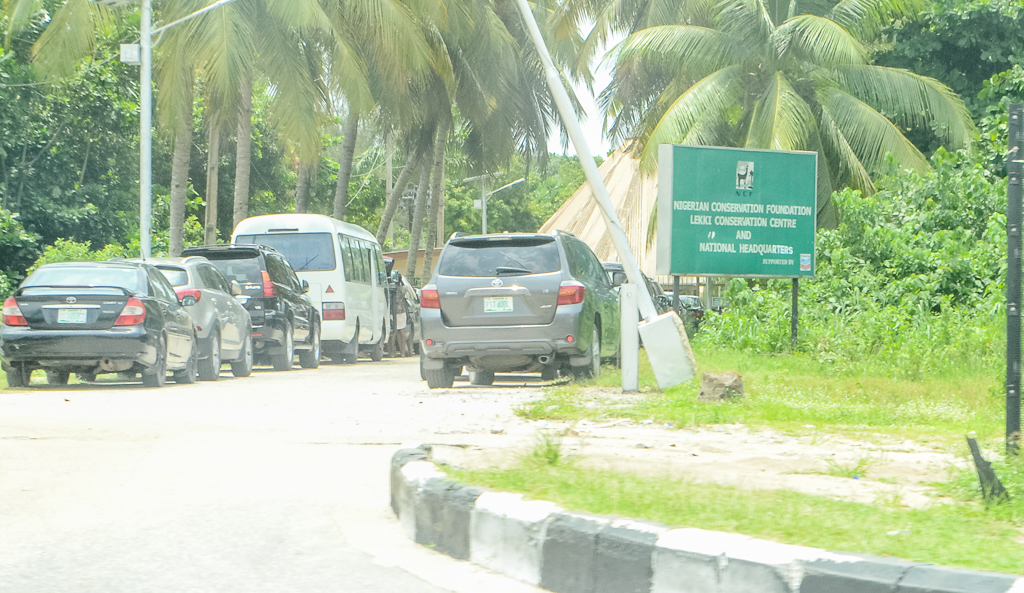
- Nigeria Conservation Foundation Lekki
- Formation: 1980
- Headquarters: Lekki, Lagos
- Director General: Dr. Onoja Joseph Daniel
- Website: https://www.ncfnigeria.org/

The Nigerian Conservation Foundation (NCF) is an environmental non-governmental organization that promotes environmental tourism with the goal of expanding awareness of Nigeria's natural resources and creating economic incentives. Founded in 1980 by Shafi Edu, the foundation has since undertaken numerous resource management and conservation projects across Nigeria. Chief Ede Dafinone is the current chairman of the foundation, and Dr. Muhtari Aminu-Kano is the director-general.

One of the founders was Akintola Williams. The Akintola Williams Arboretum at the Nigerian Conservation Foundation headquarters in Lagos is named in his honor. It engages in lobbying work both at the national and state levels. It also has a number of educational initiatives to raise awareness of environmental issues in Nigeria. It works with higher education, primary and secondary schools, and the general public through local initiatives in target areas. The NCF has called for actions and awareness to conserve the pangolin.

The NCF has partnerships with a number of international environmental groups, including the World Wildlife Fund, the International Union for Conservation of Nature, BirdLife International, Wetlands International, Fauna and Flora International, and the Wildlife Conservation Society. It has also partnered with several industry groups, including Chevron and BG Group, in Nigeria's oil and gas industry. The NCF established the Lekki Conservation Centre in 1990, which houses the National Secretariat of the foundation, while their regional office is in Calabar, Cross River State, Nigeria.

In 1992, the NCF was added to the UN Environmental Program's Global 500 Roll of Honour.

According to the Climate Score Card, "NCF is regarded as one of the best environmental NGOs in the country. Currently, they have projects in 9 different states, ranging from the Participatory Forest Management Project in Taraba State to the Management of Becheve Nature Reserve, Obudu Cattle Ranch, Obudu, and Cross River State. Their best practice climate project would have to be the Biodiversity Action Plan (BAP) in Edo state."

== Centres ==
- Lekki Conservation Centre (LCC)
- Becheve Nature Reserve
- Finima Nature Park
- Abuja Conservation Centre.

== Organisational structure ==
The organisational structure of the foundation is made up of the board of trustees (BOT), headed by a president, and the national executive council, headed by a chairman. The current president of the board of trustees is Izoma Philip Asiodu, CFR, CON, while the chairman of the national executive council is Chief Ede Dafinone.

== Achievements ==
- In 1984, the NCF assisted in developing National Conservation Strategy.
- In 1985, due to the support they gave the government, the Endangered Species Decree was enacted.
- In 1990, the Lekki Conservation Centre was established by the foundation.
- In 1992, the NCF founded the Hadejia-Nguru wetland conservation project.
- NCF has influenced the establishment of FEPA (Federal Environment Protection Agency).
- Management of Okomu games before it became a national park.

== Projects ==
The NCF had done Afi Mountain Reserve and Gashaka Gumti NP, both aiming at conservation of ape and elimination of poverty. The project Vulture Save Zone was carried out to ensure the protection of vultures in Anambra and Enugu, with the training of 38 individuals in the Awgu Local Government Area of Enugu and 13 individuals from the Awka entity in Anambra.

Planned projects

The coordinator of NCF Green Recovery Nigeria, Folake Salawu, has announced the creation of additional reserves in different areas by partnering with Nigeria's national parks. The location of the reserves will be determined by the stakeholders in the six geopolitical zones as part of the green recovery plan, just after the federal government has allocated space for the intended reserves.

The Kwara State government is planning to plant 2.5 million trees by 2047 in partnership with the NCF. The project is to involve about 100 communities.
