= Lekki Conservation Centre =

Biodiversity conservation centre in Lagos, Nigeria

- IUCN category Ia (strict nature reserve)
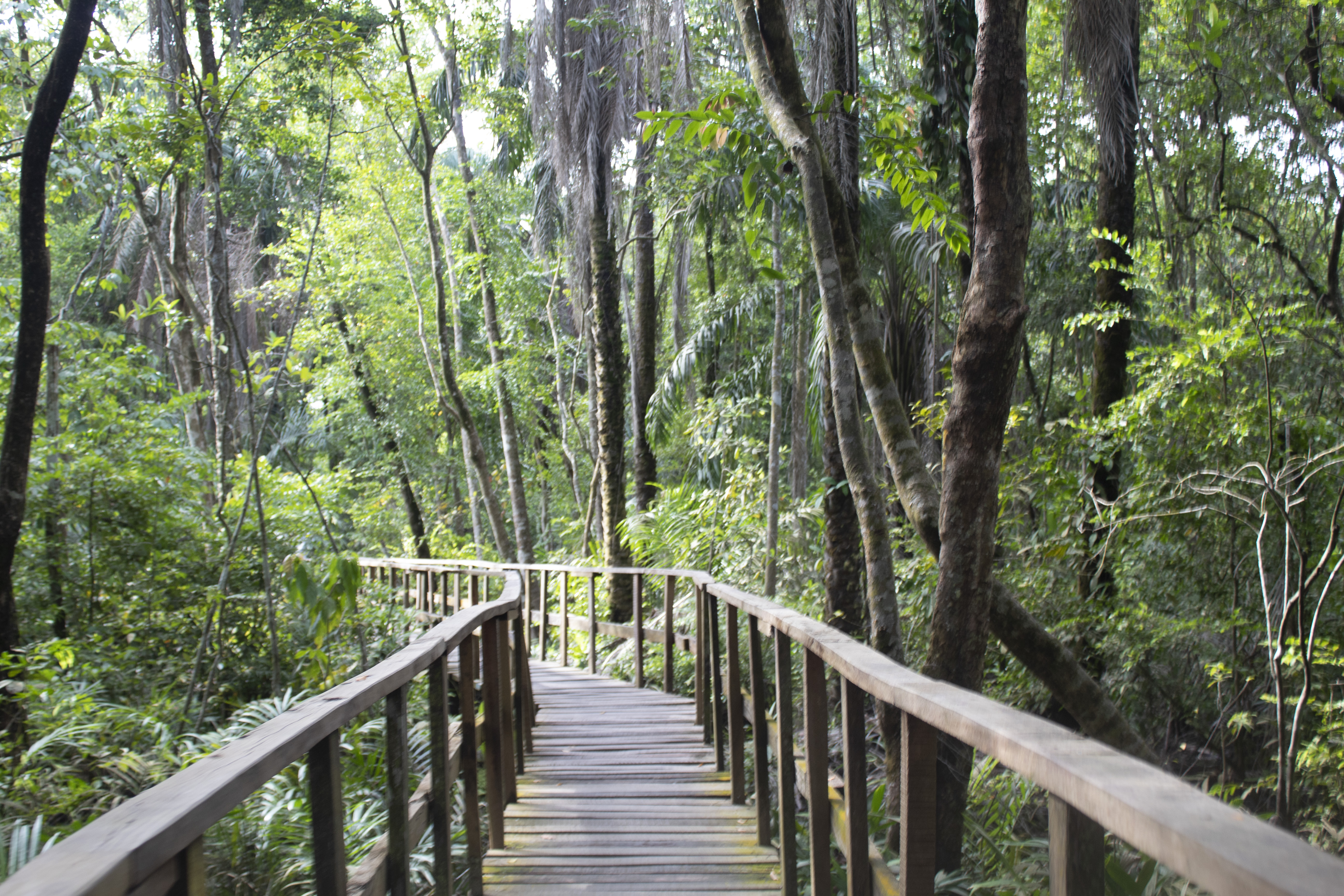
- A pathway in the Lekki Conservation Centre

- Location within Nigeria
- Interactive map of Lekki Conservation Centre
- Location: Lekki, Lagos State, Nigeria
- Coordinates: 6°26′11″N 3°32′08″E
- Area: 0.78 square kilometres (78 ha; 0.30 sq mi; 190 acres)
- Established: 1990
- Governing body: Nigerian Conservation Foundation
- Website: www.ncfnigeria.org/projects/lekki-conservation-centre

Lekki Conservation Centre (LCC) is a 78-hectare (190-acre) Natural Resource Conservation reserve in Lekki, Lagos State Nigeria. It is part of the PARCC West Africa project.

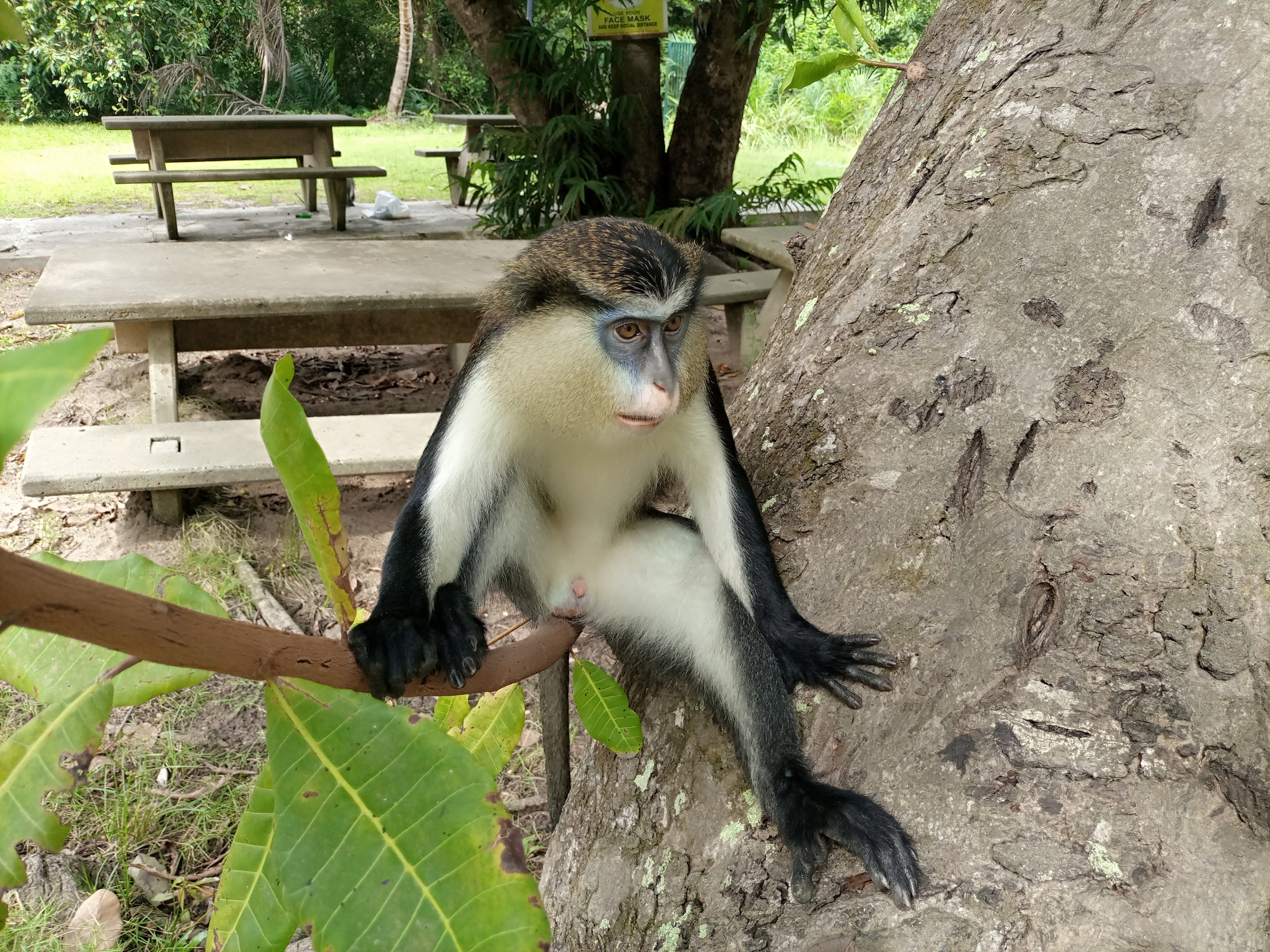
Monkey at Lekki Conservation Centre

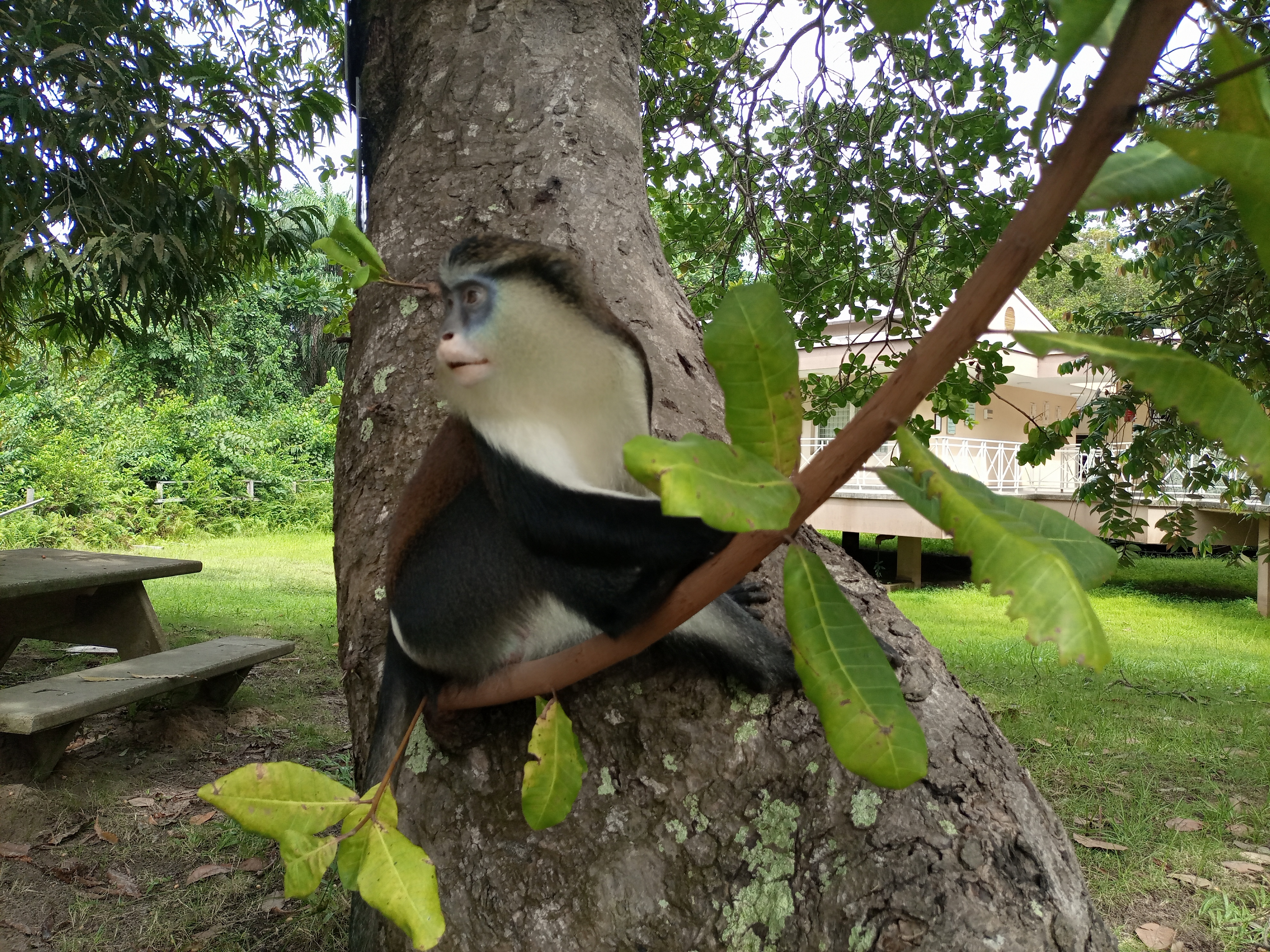
Monkey at Lekki Conservation Centre

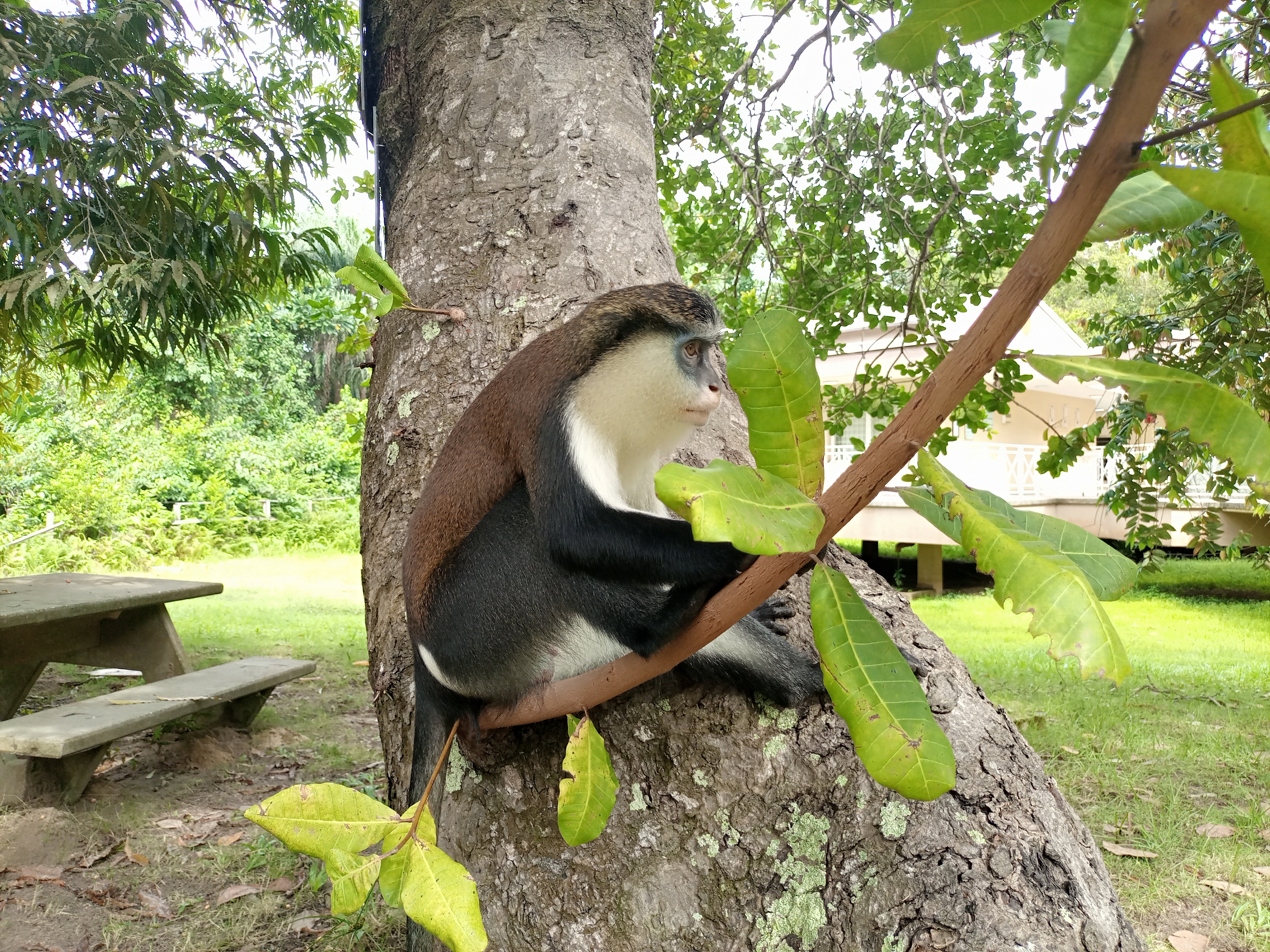
Monkey at Lekki Conservation Centre

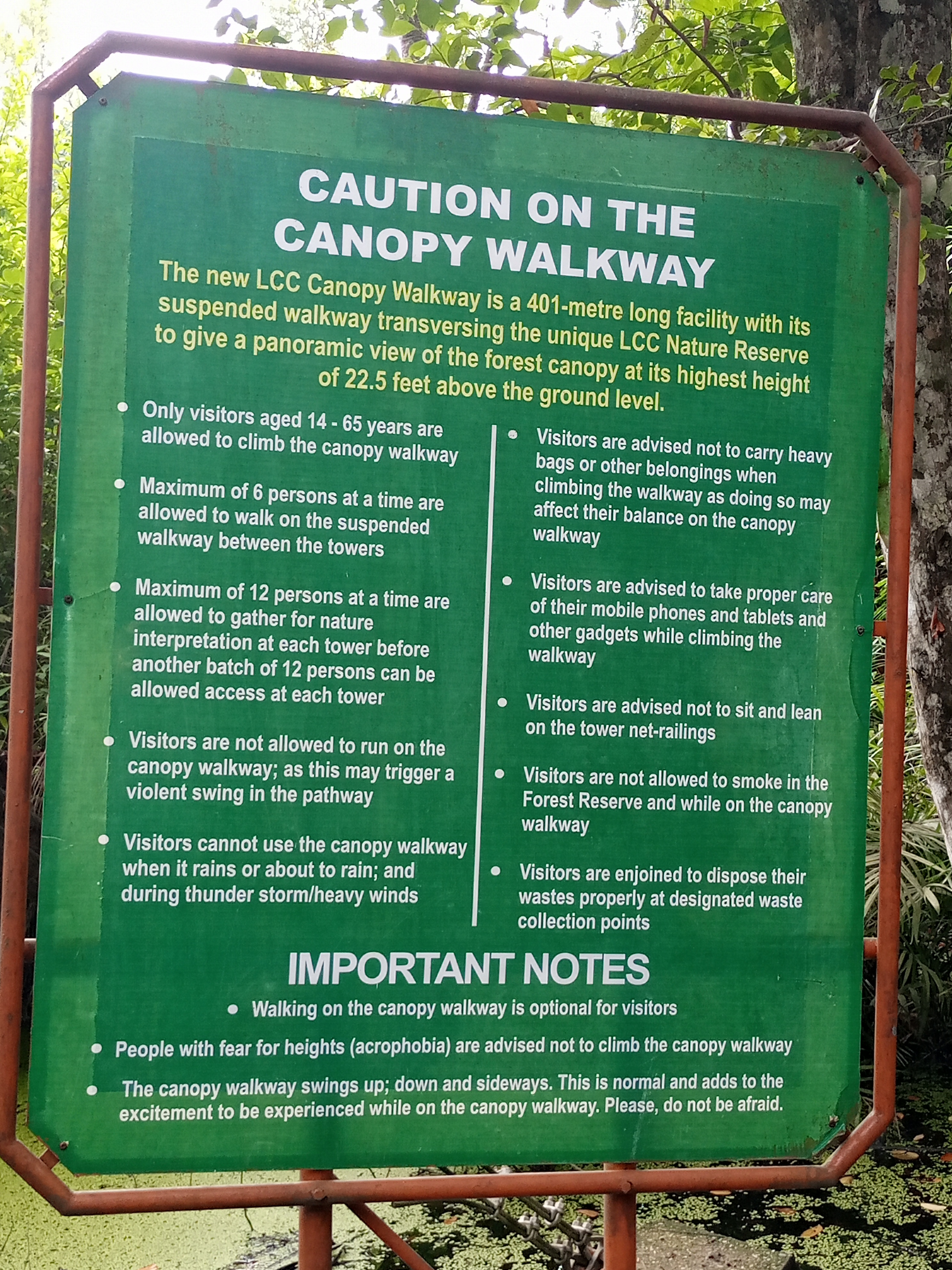
Lekki Conservation Centre Caution Board

== History ==
The centre was established in 1990 to serve as a biodiversity conservation icon and as an environment education centre. The facility was built by the Chevron Corporation for the Nigerian Conservation Foundation (NCF), as a reserved sanctuary for the rich flora and fauna of the Lekki Peninsula. The company has since provided annual funding for the management of the centre.

To start the conservation project, three potential areas were surveyed in 1987 by NCF technical team in partnership with the defunct Lagos State Ministry of Agriculture and Cooperative. Thereafter, Lekki area was chosen to establish the demonstration site for the conservation project. Locating the conservation project on Lekki Peninsula informed the name of the project – Lekki Conservation Centre. The centre was established by the Nigerian Conservation Foundation to protect the wildlife and mangrove forests of Nigeria's South-West coastline from the threat of urban development.

== Mission ==
The Nigerian Conservation Foundation is a non-governmental organisation dedicated to sustainable development and nature conservation. It also serves as an area of biodiversity conservation and environmental awareness center. The foundation aims to preserve Nigeria's species and ecosystems, promote sustainability when using natural resources and advocates actions that minimise the impact on the environment and prevent resource wastage. NCF has worked tirelessly to raise environmental awareness and promote responsibility. The center is located along the Lekki-Epe Expressway in the Lekki Peninsula, opposite Chevron.

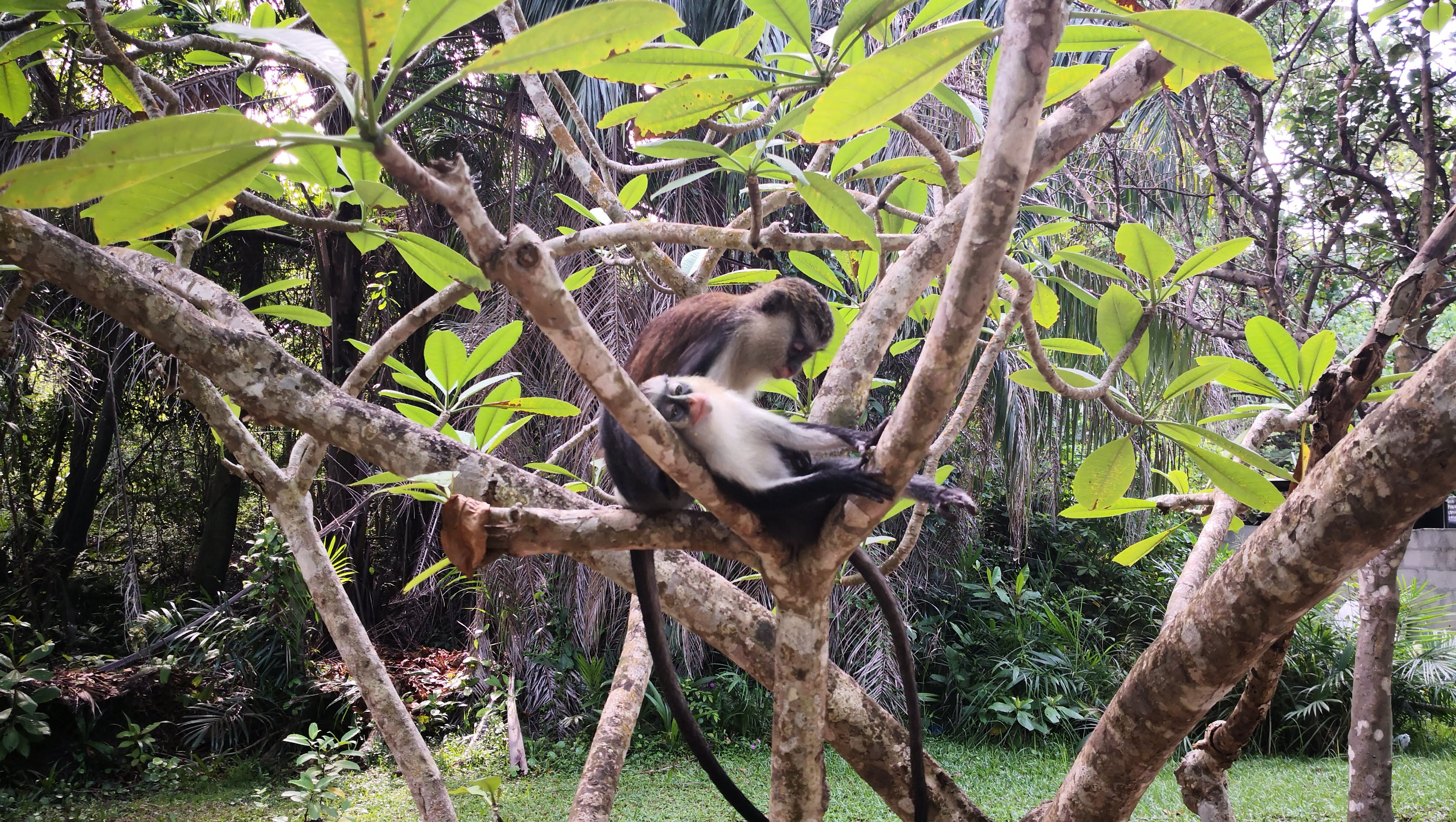
Mona Mokey

== Description ==
The reserve area which covers a land area of 78 hectares (192.74 acres) is located on Lekki Peninsula, next to the Lekki Lagoon, and near the Lagos Lagoon. It protects the wetlands of the Lekki peninsula which consists of swamp and savannah habitats. Approaching the reserve, there's a boulevard of coconut trees that leads to a well-laid-out car and Visitors Park. It is endowed with an abundance of plant and animal life. Its huge tract of wetlands is set aside for wildlife viewing. Raised walkways enable the viewing of animals like monkeys, crocodiles, snakes, and various birds. There is also a conservation center and a library.

The wetlands are managed by the Nigerian Conservation Foundation, and it now includes a figure-of-eight system of footpaths, with hiking trails and stepping stones to cross waterways. A trail boardwalk was constructed in 1992 to enrich tourists view of the vast resources of the nature reserve which is encapsulated on a mangrove terrain. Side attractions along the trail includes swamp outlook, bird hide, rest stops and the tree house. The 1.8 km nature trail behind the foremost main buildings is connected by two wooden tracks. A sturdy wooden track leading to the nature trail, reveals an expansive stretch of marshland and savannah grassland teeming with wild life, as well as rich aquatic flora and fauna. There's also a tree house which offers a twenty-one meters-high tree platform where one can have a panoramic view of the picnic area, reserve, visitor center and children's playground among the trees. The bird hide overlooks a swamp/marsh which is home to crocodiles and monitor lizards. The nature reserve traverses a mosaic of vegetation types: secondary forest, swamp forest and Savanna grassland. Several bird species can be seen here. The centre is a popular site for school excursions, and the shooting of music videos in Nigeria.

The mammal life, although mostly nocturnal is sometimes seen. The small reptiles, and a range of snakes and lizards are also found here. Amphibian life includes a wide range of endangered species. There is a cone-shaped structure which functions as the auditorium for lectures, conferences and seminars. At first glance, there are rare collections of striking pictures of endangered species of animals as well as plants prescribed in glass stands around the oval hall.

Efforts have been made to save different types of animals, reptiles and birdlife from extinction. The endangered species of animals includes bush bucks, crocodiles, mona monkeys, squirrels, snakes, crocodiles, monitor lizards, duikers, giant rats and hogs. While the trees hosts mona monkeys and other species of monkeys, the open grasslands are home to bushbucks, maxwell's duikers, giant rats, hogs, mongooses, chameleons, squirrels and an impressive variety of birdlife. Park rangers are also available as guides. Lekki Conservation Centre has the Longest Canopy walkway in Africa.

== See also ==
- List of national parks of Nigeria
