= Ikorodu Cultural Heritage Trail =

Tourism Heritage Trail in Ikorodu, Nigeria

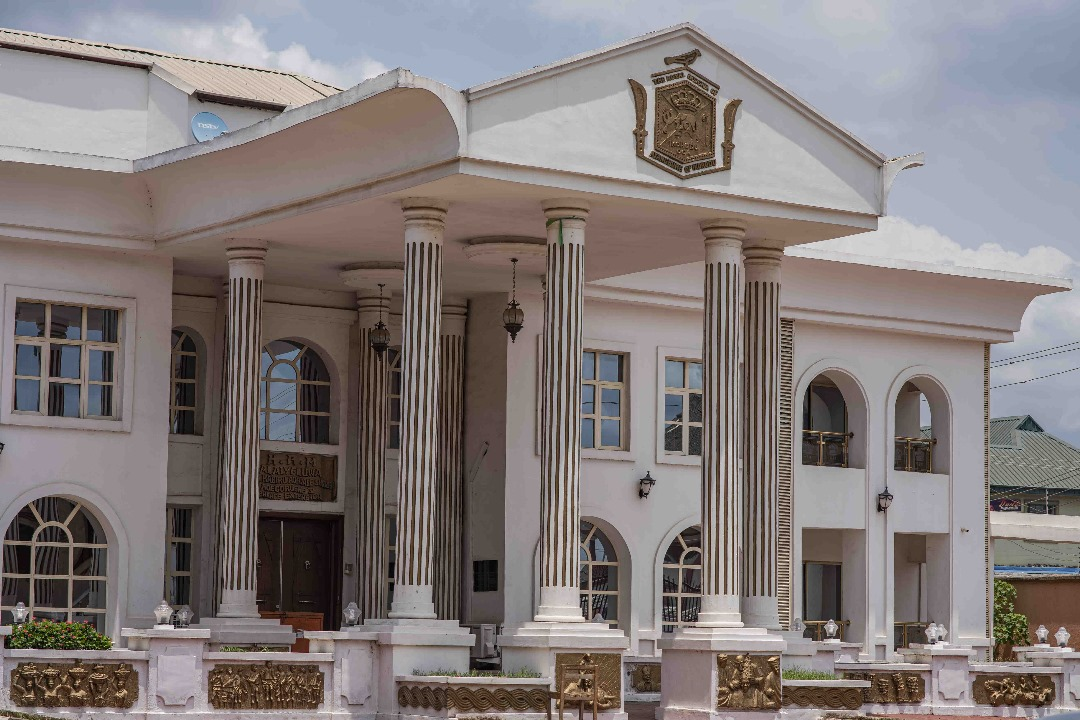
Palace of Ayangbure

The Ikorodu Cultural Heritage Trail is a cultural and historical journey through the rich cultural landscape of Ikorodu, a historic town in Lagos State, Nigeria. The trail showcases the timeline of cultural heritage of the Ikorodu people and features several historical sites, monuments, and landmarks featuring a diverse range of sites, including ancient shrines, historic markets, and royal palaces. Each site provides a unique window into the cultural heritage of Ikorodu. With the state rich cultural heritage and historic significance, the Ikorodu Heritage Trails are expected to become a tourist destination in Lagos state.

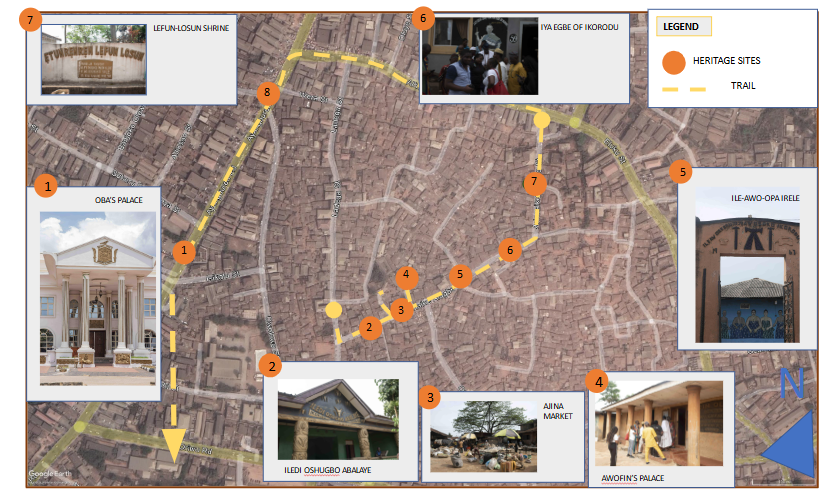
Heritage Trail Map in Ikorodu

The six sites featured on the Ikorodu Cultural Heritage Trail are:

== Heritage sites ==
The Ikorodu Cultural Heritage Trail across the eight division includes the following heritage sites.

- Iledi Oshugbo Abalaye: A sacred grove dedicated to the worship of the gods of the forest.
- Oba Ayangbure Palace: The palace of the Oba of Ikorodu, showcasing the rich cultural heritage of the Ikorodu monarchy.
- Ijede Warm Spring
- Ikorodu Central Mosque
- Obateru of Egbin's Royal Palace
- Egbin Boat Jetty
- Ipebi House
- Etunerere Lofun Lose Shrine

== Intangible cultural asset ==
The festivals are part of the intangible cultural heritage of Ikorodu aimed at promoting unity, cultural exchange, and tourism development in the Ikorodu division.

- Agemo festival
- Odun-Osu Festival
- Asa Festival
- Eyibi Festival
- Eluku
- Igunnuko Festival
- Odun Lefun Liwe

== Cultural Heritage Groups ==
- Oro: Magbo / Liwe / Pakor. Ilu Ikorodu
- Obaluaye: Ilu Ikorodu
- Alagemo, Meboyi: Ilu Ikorodu
- Osugbo Abalaye: ilu Ikorodu
- Eleluku Ikorodu: ilu Ikorodu
- Oni-Lire Ikorodu: ilu Ikorodu
- Irele Awo-opa (Akee): ilu Ikorodu
- Odi Oba: ilu Ikorodu
- Turupu Ikorodu central: ilu Ikorodu
- Aijasanmi Osanyin: ilu Ikorodu
- Aranfo: ilu Ikorodu
- Egun Aga: ilu Ikorodu
- Awo Abilefo: ilu Ikorodu
- Asa: ilu Ikorodu
- IGUNNUKO: ilu Ikorodu
- Ogboni Aborigen ilu Ikorodu

== Conservation efforts ==
Efforts are being made to conserve and protect the heritage sites along the Ikorodu Cultural Heritage Trail. The Lagos State Government, in collaboration with local communities and stakeholders, is working to restore and preserve the sites, ensuring their integrity and authenticity for future generations.

=== Festivals and Intangible Heritage Documentation ===
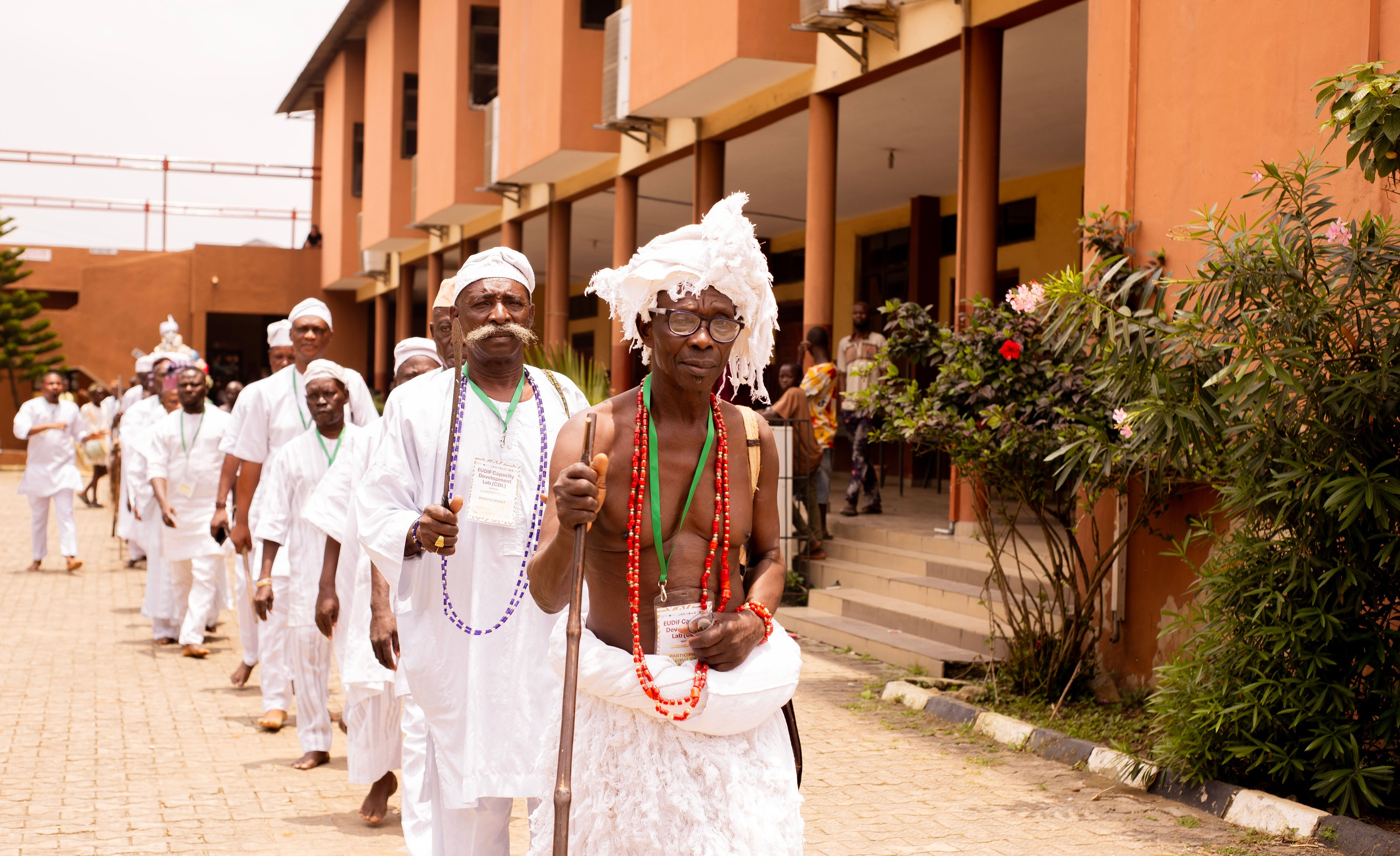
Capacity building class demonstration showcasing the Isese culture

In addition to its physical landmarks, the Ikorodu Culture reflects a range of intangible cultural heritage expressed through traditional festivals and community practices. Notable examples include the Agemo, Asa, and Igunnuko festivals, as well as the Ikorodu Oga Day celebration, which are integral to the cultural identity of the Ikorodu community.

These festivals involve performances and communal gatherings that preserve indigenous knowledge systems and social structures. They also contribute to the cultural significance of the heritage trail by providing experiential and participatory elements for both residents and visitors.

Documentation efforts have been undertaken to digitally record and archive these cultural expressions as part of broader heritage preservation initiatives. These efforts aim to support the transmission of intangible heritage to future generations while enhancing accessibility for wider audiences.

=== Development and Capacity Building ===
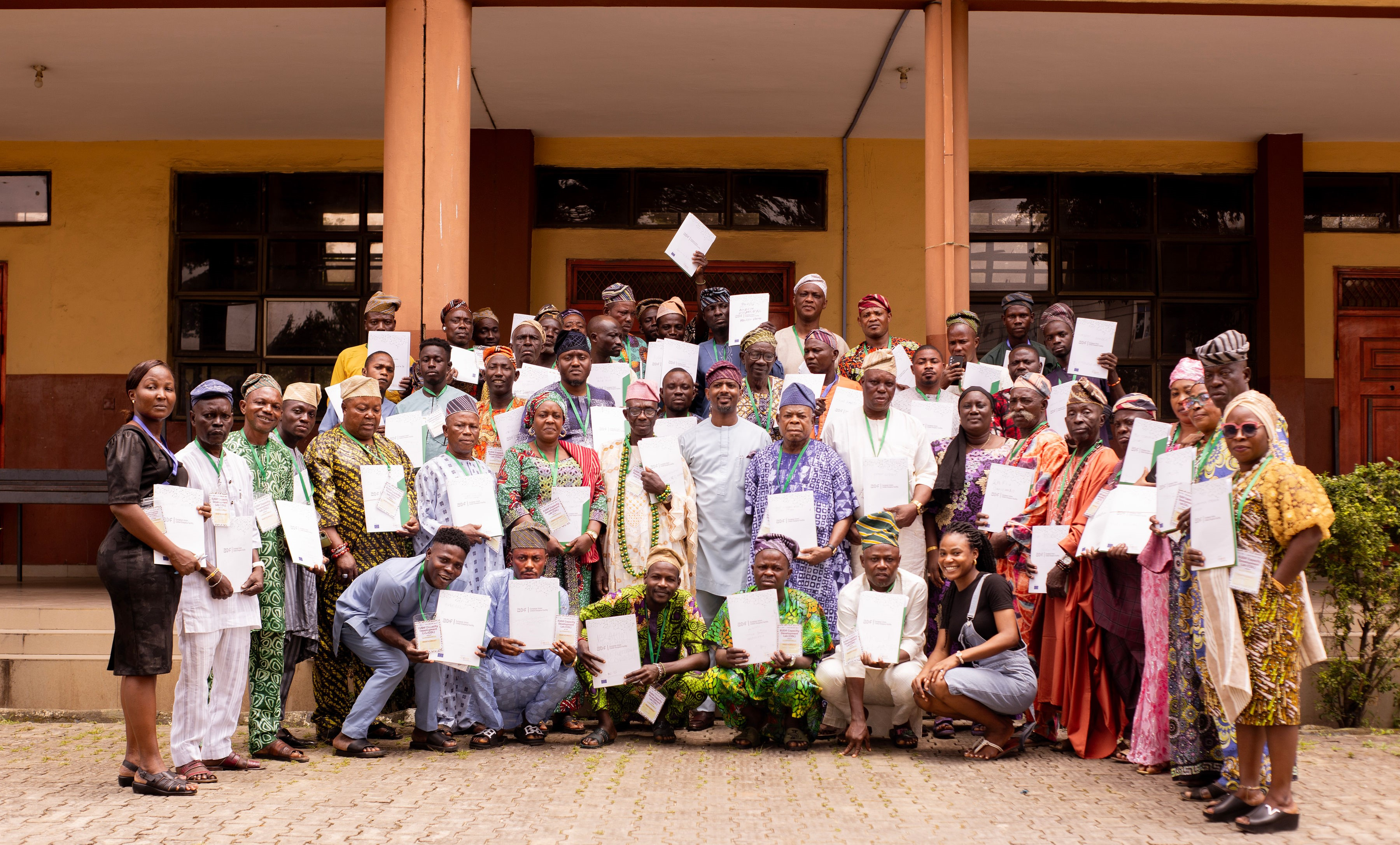
Group photograph of participants and facilitators at the EUDiF Capacity Development Lab, featuring 50 attendees

The development and documentation have been supported through capacity-building initiatives aimed at strengthening heritage preservation and cultural documentation. One such initiative is the European Union Global Diaspora Facility (EUDiF) Capacity Development Lab, implemented in collaboration with the Lagos State Ministry of Culture, Arts and Tourism, the National Commission for Museums and Monuments (NCMM), and local custodians of the Ikorodu Kingdom.

The programme enabled the documentation of both tangible and intangible heritage assets through the equipping of cultural custodians and community stakeholders with skills needed to protect, preserve, and promote the unique heritage of Ikorodu. Areas of capacity development included digital documentation, cultural storytelling, stakeholder engagement, and heritage management practices.

These efforts contributed to the preservation and visibility of heritage sites and practices associated with the Ikorodu Cultural Heritage Trail, while supporting broader heritage tourism development in the administrative division.

== Gallery ==
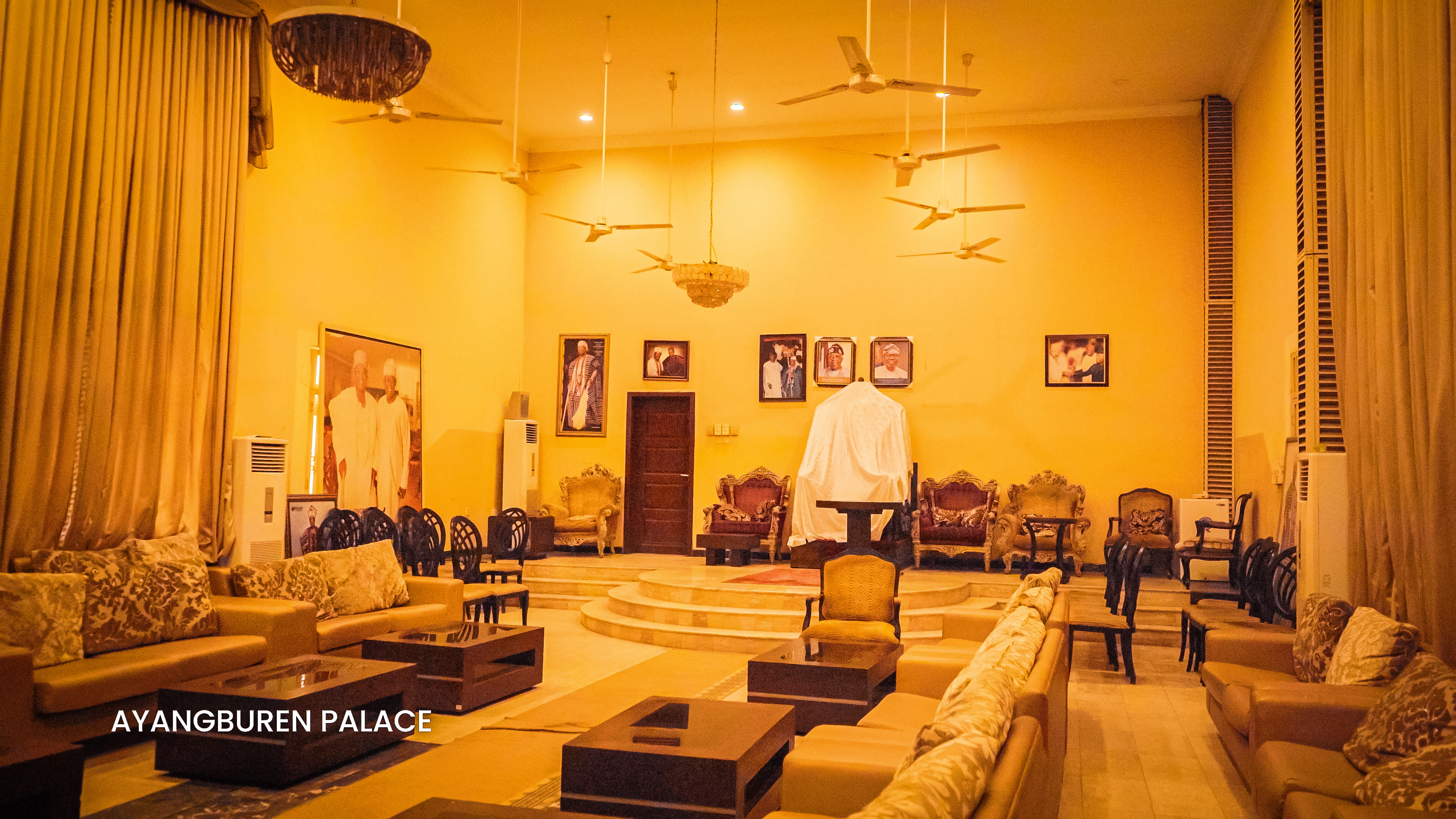
File:Inner_court_of_the_Ayangbure_palace,_Ikorodu.jpg

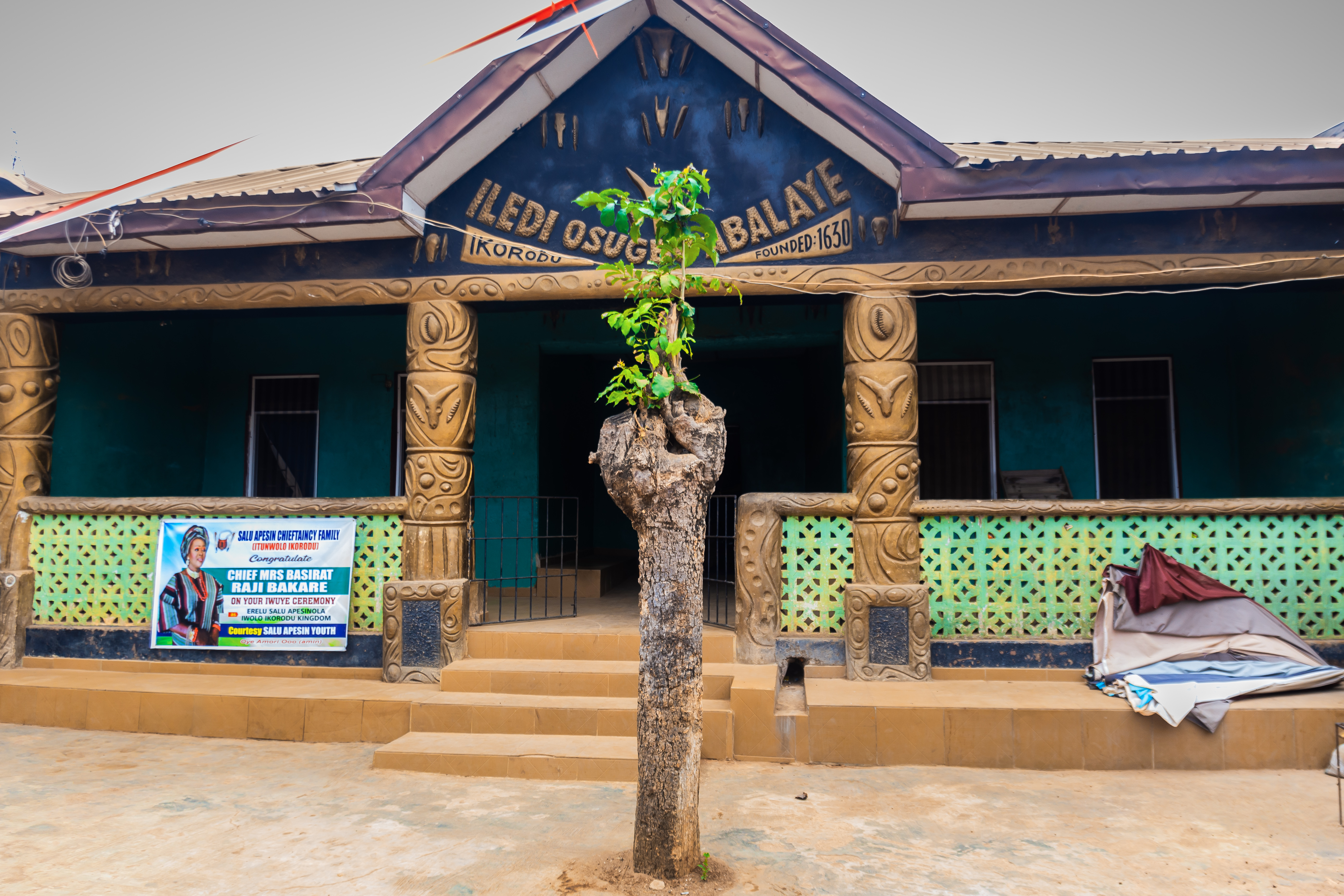
File:Iledi_Osugbo_Abalaye,_Square.jpg

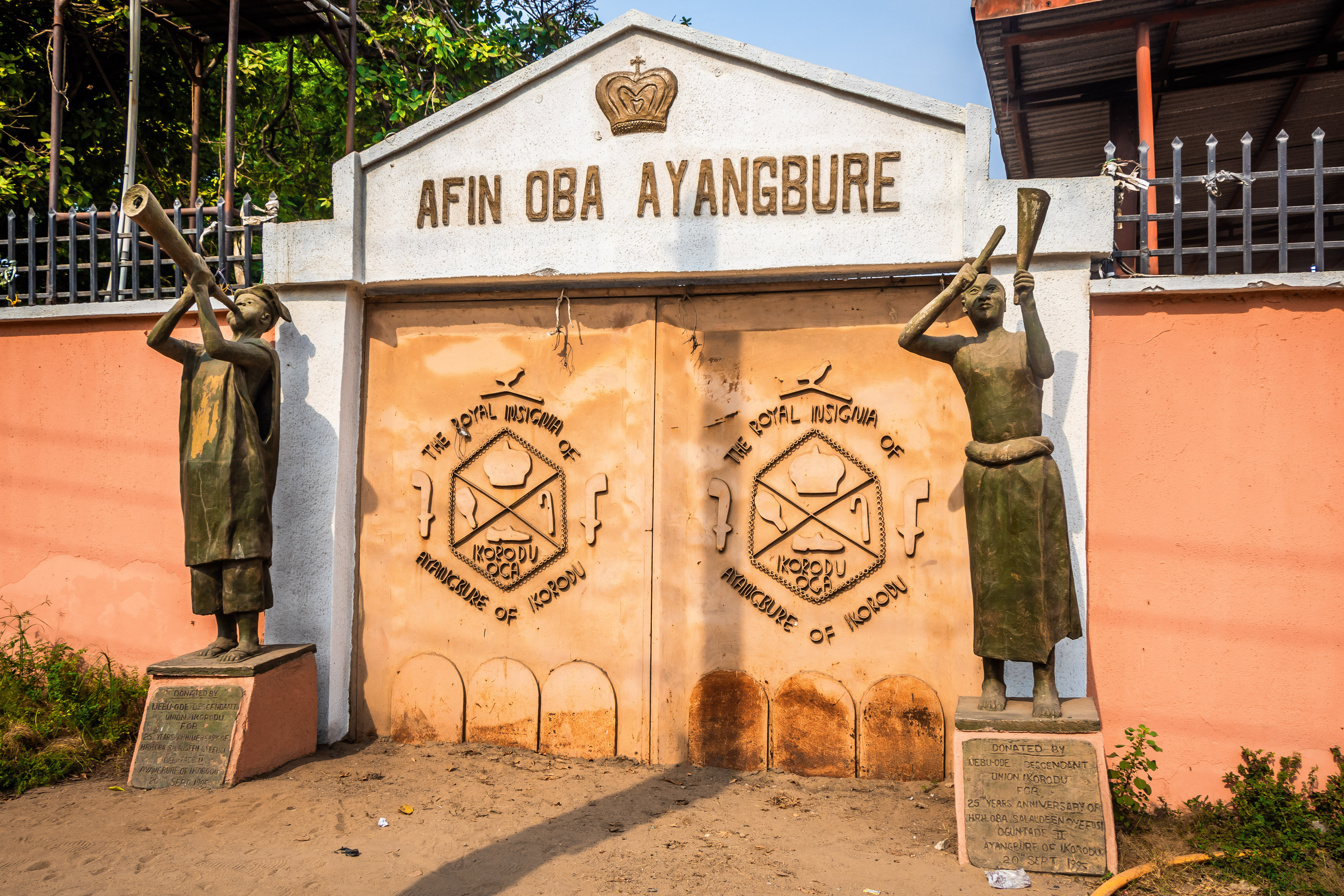
File:Insignia_of_the_Ayangbure_Palace_in_Ikorodu.jpg

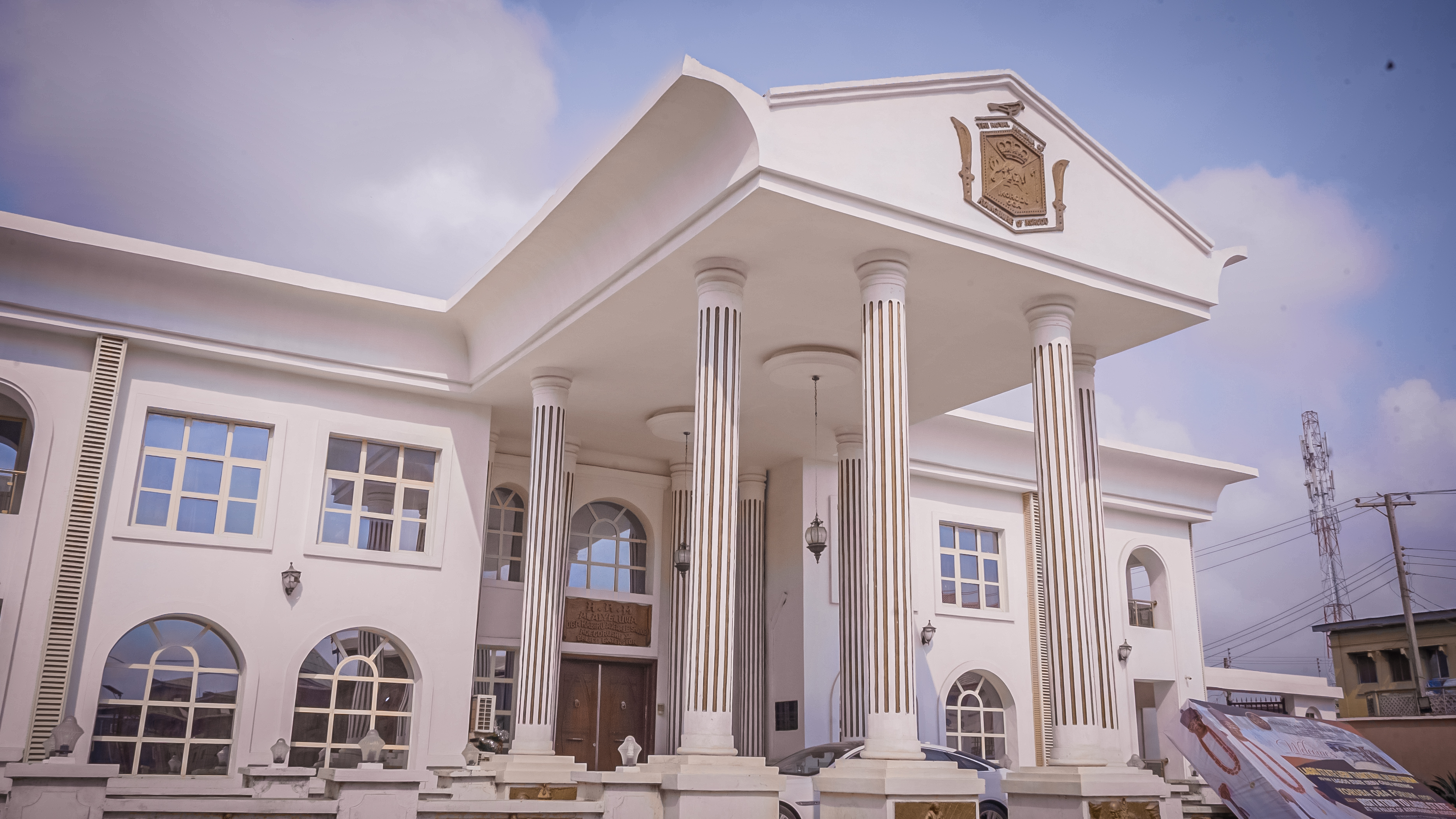
File:Palace_of_the_Ayangbure_palace,_Ikorodu.jpg

== See also ==
- Tourist Attraction in Lagos
