= List of cultural festivals in Ikorodu =

This is an incomplete list of cultural festivals held yearly in Ikorodu, Nigeria:

Name	Location	Time	Years	Ref	Notes
Eyibi Festival	Ijede	August/October			
Agemo festival	Yoruba cities	August			
Eluku	Ikorodu towns				It is a version of the general Yoruba Oro festival.
Odun-Osu Festival	Ayangbunre's Palace	January			First royal festival of the year in which the 'Rogunyo' plays a crucial role.
Ogun Festival	Yoruba cities	September to October			A festival held to appease the god of iron(Ogun)
Magbo Festival/Oro Magbog	Ijomu, Ikorodu	May			A festival held for cleansing of the land during which women are not allowed to move about.
Asa Festival	lkorodu Town Hall	December			
