= Ijede spring =

Spring in Ikorodu, Lagos

Ijede Spring Water
- Location: Ijede, Lagos State, Nigeria
- Type: Spring
- Basin countries: Nigeria

Ijede spring, also known as Ijede warm spring, or Odoro spring in Yoruba is a natural spring water located in the Ijede community in the Ikorodu area of Lagos State. It was discovered by the elder Baba Odoro during a severe drought. Historically, the spring is believed to be a divine gift and has provided water to the community for generations.

== Description ==
The spring and its stream are maintained by the community and flow directly into the Lagos lagoon. The spot is listed as a gazetted tourism site and one of three designated sites in the Ikorodu Division by the Lagos State Government. It is also a stop on the Ikorodu Cultural Heritage Trail.

Around 2020, a group called the Odoro Development Base executed a beautification project at Ijede spring to clear the area and create a beach for swimming. The community used the beach and hoped that it would contribute tourism around the spring, but it has since fallen into disrepair and become overgrown.

== See also ==
- Ijede
- Ikorodu Cultural Heritage Trail
- Tourist attractions in Lagos
