= Gbolahan =

Gbolahan is a given name. Notable people with the given name include:

- Gbolahan Mudasiru (1945–2003), Nigerian Air Force officer and politician
- Gbolahan Olusegun Yishawu (born 1967), Nigerian politician
- Gbolahan Salami (born 1991), Nigerian footballer
- Ogunleye Gbolahan Adetokunbo, Nigerian politician
