= Ogudu =

Suburb in Lagos, Nigeria

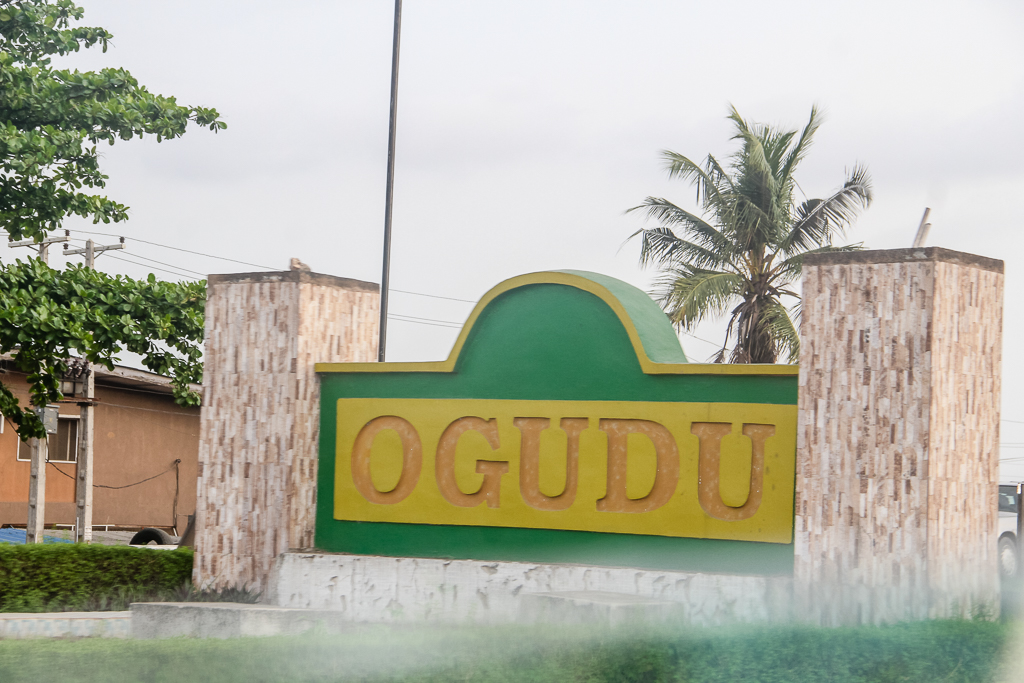
Ogudu, Lagos

Ogudu is a suburb in Ojota, Kosofe Local Government Lagos State, Nigeria. Ogudu GRA and Ogudu Orioke make up the neighbourhood of Ogudu. Ogudu which shares borders with Ifako, Ojota and Ketu, is one of the central and most sought after areas in Lagos as it is in close proximity to major areas in Lagos State. Ogudu also has a Government reserved area, known as Ogudu GRA which consists of exotic houses, a good road network, functional streetlights and a drainage system. Meanwhile, like any regular suburb Ogudu also has a slum in the area with no drainage and dilapidated road. Ogudu was founded over 300 years ago by a brave hunter Amosu by name, he left Ile Ife in present Osun state, western Nigeria with his brother Amore and their family . They both passed through many cities among the cities are the Ajase Ipo, old Oyo, Igbein, Abeokuta and the present Ikeja. His brother decided to stay behind with others at Ikeja axis called oko Amore while he continued the journey with his wife Pefunmi and children in search of an area bounded with water based on the instruction/advised given by the Ifa oracle before the commencement of the journey., He settled at the present town known as Ogudu, He had four children; Onbohun, Oduagbo, Ikuyeju and Ifashola the only male child among his siblings.
