= Ganiyu Sanni =

Nigerian politician

Hon. Sanni Ganiyu Okanlawon

Member, Lagos State House of Assembly
- Incumbent
- Assumed office 2019
- Constituency: Kosofe Constituency I

Personal details
- Born: March 28, 1965 (age 61) Lagos State
- Party: All Progressives Congress (APC)
- Spouse: Alhaja Halimat Abisoye Sanni
- Education: Yaba College of Technology University of Calabar Lagos State University
- Occupation: Politician, Chartered Accountant
- Website: Lagos Assembly Profile

Hon. Sanni Ganiyu Babatunde Okanlawon, popularly known as OKLA, is a Nigerian chartered accountant and politician. He currently serves as a member of the Lagos State House of Assembly, representing Kosofe Constituency I under the platform of the All Progressives Congress (APC). Before his legislative career, he served in the executive arm of the Lagos State Government as the Special Adviser to the Governor on Food Security, where he played a pivotal role in the LAKE Rice initiative.

== Early life and education ==
Sanni Ganiyu Okanlawon was born on March 28, 1965, in Lagos State. He began his education at St. Agnes Primary School, Maryland, obtaining his First School Leaving Certificate in 1976. He proceeded to Victory High School, Ikeja, for his secondary education, graduating in 1982.

He pursued higher education at the Yaba College of Technology (YABATECH), where he earned an Ordinary National Diploma (OND) in Accountancy in 1990 and a Higher National Diploma (HND) in Accountancy in 1998. Committed to professional development, he obtained a Post Graduate Diploma (PGD) in Management from the University of Calabar in 2000 and a Master's in Business Administration (MBA) from Lagos State University (LASU), Ojo, in 2006.

== Career ==
=== Political career ===
Before his election into the legislature, Okanlawon served as the Special Adviser on Food Security to the then-Governor of Lagos State, Akinwunmi Ambode. During his tenure, he was instrumental in the execution of the LAKE Rice partnership between Lagos and Kebbi States, a strategic initiative aimed at boosting local rice production and ensuring food security in Lagos. In 2019, he contested and won the seat to represent Kosofe Constituency I in the Lagos State House of Assembly. He was re-elected for a second term in the 2023 general elections. In the Assembly, he has served in various leadership capacities, including as the Chairman of the House Committee on Local Government Administration, Chieftaincy Affairs, and Rural Development. In this role, he oversees the activities of local councils and traditional institutions in the state.

== Constituency Initiatives ==
Hon. Okanlawon is known for his focus on education and youth development through the OKLA Scholarship Scheme. He has awarded scholarships to indigent students in public tertiary institutions across Nigeria. Notable beneficiaries include first-class graduates from the University of Lagos who received financial support through his foundation.

== Awards and Recognition ==
Baba Adinni (2025): In November 2025, he was conferred with the Islamic chieftaincy title of Baba Adinni of Mende Araromi Central Mosque, Maryland, in recognition of his contributions to the religious community. His wife was simultaneously honoured as the Amira-ul-Hajj.
