= Odun-Osu Festival =

Annual traditional festival in Ikorodu, Nigeria

- Status: Active
- Location: Ikorodu
- Country: Nigeria
- Founder: Oba Kaalu Ekewaolu
- Area: The Rogunyo
- traditional ruler: Ayangburen of Ikorodu

The Odun-Osu Festival is an annual traditional festival celebrated in Ikorodu, Lagos State, Nigeria. It is the first traditional festival of the year in the town, marking the commencement of other traditional celebrations. The festival is considered a royal event and is led by the Ayangburen of Ikorodu, the town's traditional ruler, in March.

== History and background ==
The Odun-Osu Festival takes place annually toward the end of the dry season, just before the first rains. It is a royal festival, deeply rooted in the traditions of Ikorodu, with participation from the highest traditional social club, The Rogunyo.

The festival was introduced by Oba Kaalu Ekewaolu, the fourth monarch of the Ikorodu Kingdom, who held the title Adegboruwa the 3rd. Oba Ekewaolu not only established the festival but also laid down the procedures for its celebration.

== Festival ceremonies ==
The Rogunyo drum is played during the festival to commemorate the victory in the ancient Egba war. Following this, the Kekeku (sea turtle shell) is played by the Odis, the custodians of the royal throne. The rites conclude with the Oba paying tribute to his predecessors and pronouncing blessings of prosperity on the land.

The theme song of the Odun-Osu festival reflects the noble intentions of the event: "Wa lowo, wa bimo lodun ton'bo...". The song is a prayer for wealth and fertility for all participants.

== See also ==
- Oba Ayangbure's Palace
- List of cultural festivals in Ikorodu
