= Ikosi =

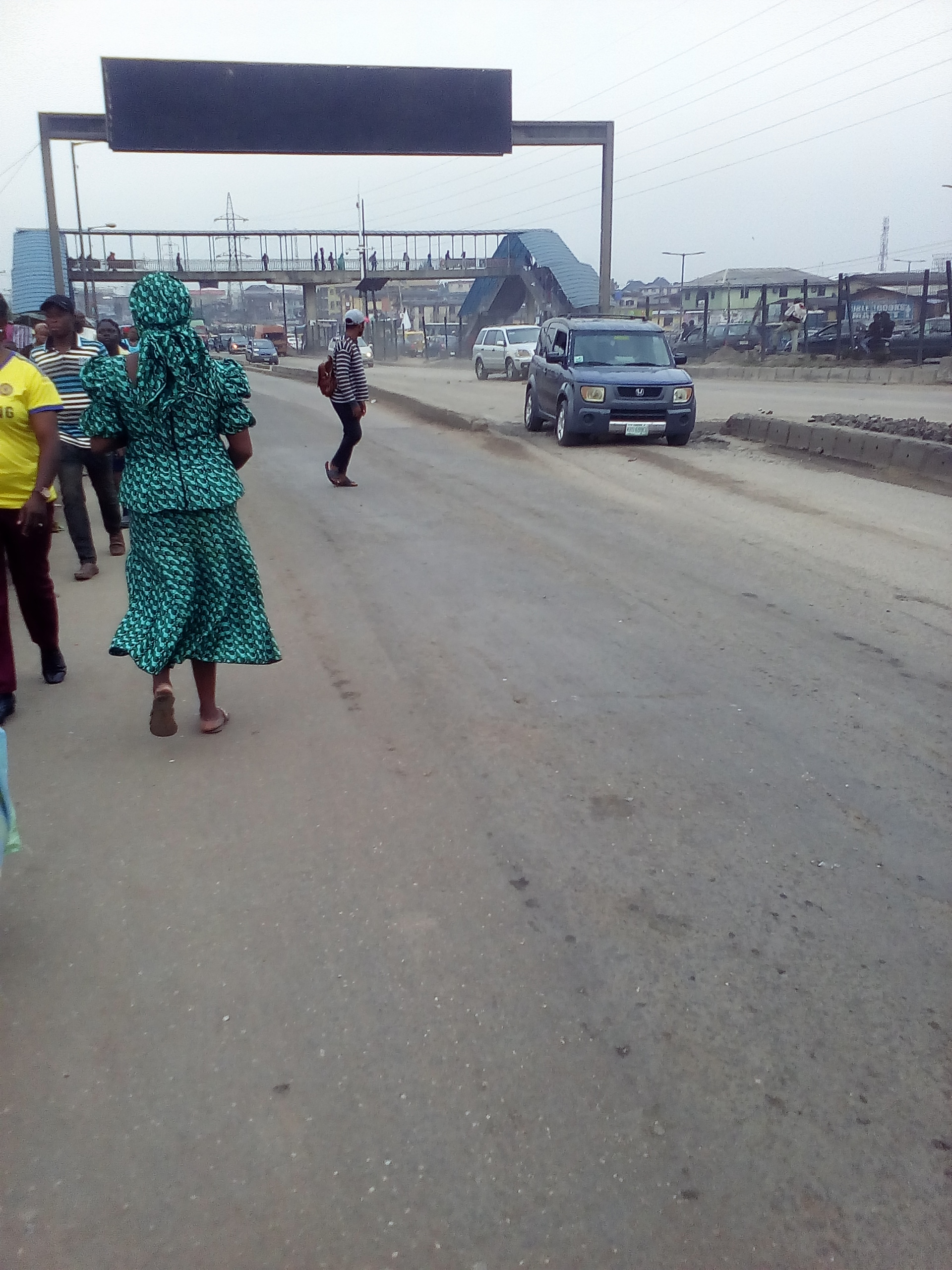
Ketu, Lagos

Ikosi a major town in Kosofe Local Government Area of Lagos State.

The residents of the area remitted their taxes to the colonial Assistant District Officer to Ikeja, Mr E.J.Gibbond through Chief Yesufu Taiwo, the then Onikosi in 1939. Nigeria. Obas of Ikosi kingdom are the paramount rulers of Kosofe land.

Ikosi, the administrative headquarters of the seven villages that make up Kosofe, was founded in the 17th century, by Aina Ejo, the seventh son of Akanbiogun, an Ile-Ife prince and warrior who previously domiciled in Iwaye Quarters in Ota (Ogun State). He later left Ota to settle for a virgin land.

Indigenes of Ikosi are of the Awori stock of the Yoruba race and are remarkably hospitable and peaceful people. Traditional folklore has it that the name 'Ikosi' is a short form of the saying 'Kosi Kosi' which refers to the saying of the early settlers to visitors that they never hoard their things from visitors. They were traditionally farmers.

Aina Ejo founder of Ikosi kingdom begat Taiwo and Kehinde in 1795, Kehinde begat Bakare Onikosi, Rufai Oloyede and others Taiwo-Olowo begat Yesufu Oke Taiwo, Joseph Ogunlana Taiwo, Funmilayo Taiwo and the last born who became the first statutory King of modern Ikosi - Oba Adegboyega Taiwo (Akeja Oniyanru I) who was born in 1901 and ruled between 1996 and 2006. He was the statutory Chairman and Oba Bashua of Somolu was the vice-chairman of the Chieftaincy Committee of Somolu local Government till 1996. Upon the creation of Kosofe Local Government, he retained the chairmanship before the coronation and installation of Oba Bashiru Olountoyin Saliu, the Oba of Oworonshoki who deputised for him in 1998. Oba Adegboyega Taiwo (Akeja Oniyanru I) was succeeded by Oba Samuel Alamu Kehinde Onikosi (Edun-Arobadi 1) on Tuesday July 24, 2007.

The population and economic value of Ikosi were prime considerations when Ikosi/Isheri LCDA was created.

Ikosi is the secretariat of Ikosi-Isheri Development Council and home to the largest fruit and vegetable market in Lagos, which was created in 1979.

Ikosi is bordered by two major highways in Lagos State. The Lagos-Ibadan Expressway serves as an artery linking Lagos to other parts of the country. The Lagos-Ikorodu Road also travels from Jibowu through Ikosi to Ikorodu. The Post Code for Ikosi is 100246

All Saints' Anglican Parish Church, the headquarter of Ikosi Archdeaconry of the Diocese of Lagos West of the Church of Nigeria (Anglican Communion) stands right along the Lagos-Ibadan Expressway.

Ikosi is the site of TV Continental (formerly GOTEL UHF 65), a television station and Radio Continental 103.3FM (formerly LINK FM), a radio station. A campus of Lagos State Polytechnic was formerly located at Ikosi. The Centre for Management Development (CMD) is also located in Ikosi.

Prominent indigenes of Ikosi oer the years include Prince Olaolu Taiwo (Councilor in the Second Republic), Prince Atanda Jimoh (also a councilor then), Prince Alamu Taiwo who was instrumental to the placement of All Saints' Parish Anglican Church, Major Kayode Taiwo (Rtd)., Arc (Prince) Ademola Taiwo, a former permanent secretary (PPUD) in the Lagos State Government.

Hon Prince Owolabi Taiwo was also councilor and later rose to the position of Speaker of Ikosi Local Govt., Lagos State. Records show that the young Ikosi prince bluntly refused to compromise the development of Ikosi/Isheri for personal material gain while in office thus making him the most popular council leader and one of the most vibrant and upright councilors in Lagos. State.

PAST RULERS OF IKOSI KINGDOM

Aina Ejo-

Bakare Onikosi

Yesufu Oke Taiwo-1936

Rufai Oloyede kehinde

Adegboyega Taiwo-Asalu-1996

Alamu Oloyede-2007-till date
