= Eyibi Festival =

Cultural festival in Ikorodu, Nigeria

- Status: Active
- Date: October 15
- Venue: Oke Eletu, Ijede Local Council Development Area
- Location: Ikorodu
- Country: Nigeria

The Eyibi Festival is an annual cultural celebration held in Oke Eletu, Ijede Local Council Development Area (LCDA) of Ikorodu Local Government of Lagos State, Southwest, Nigeria. The festival is sometimes celebrated as Eyibi/Eluku Festival It showcases the community's rich Yoruba heritage, focusing on unity, peace, and spiritual renewal. Rooted in ancestral traditions, the festival serves as a time for communal bonding and cultural preservation. The Eluku and the Agemo festival are sub-festivals of the Eyibi festival which are usually celebrated among the Ijebus.

== 2024 Eyibi festival celebration ==
The 2024 Eyibi Festival commenced on October 15 with the traditional Ituworo ceremony, which involves the gathering of significant leaves used in rituals to invoke blessings of peace, harmony, and economic prosperity for the community. The Eletu of Oke Eletu, Eletu Adeniyi Omotayo Ajayi, the traditional head of Oke Eletu emphasized the importance of unity and peace, marked by elaborate ceremonies, cultural displays, and traditional rites.
