= Motunrayo Gbadebo-Alogba =

Nigerian politician (born 1990)

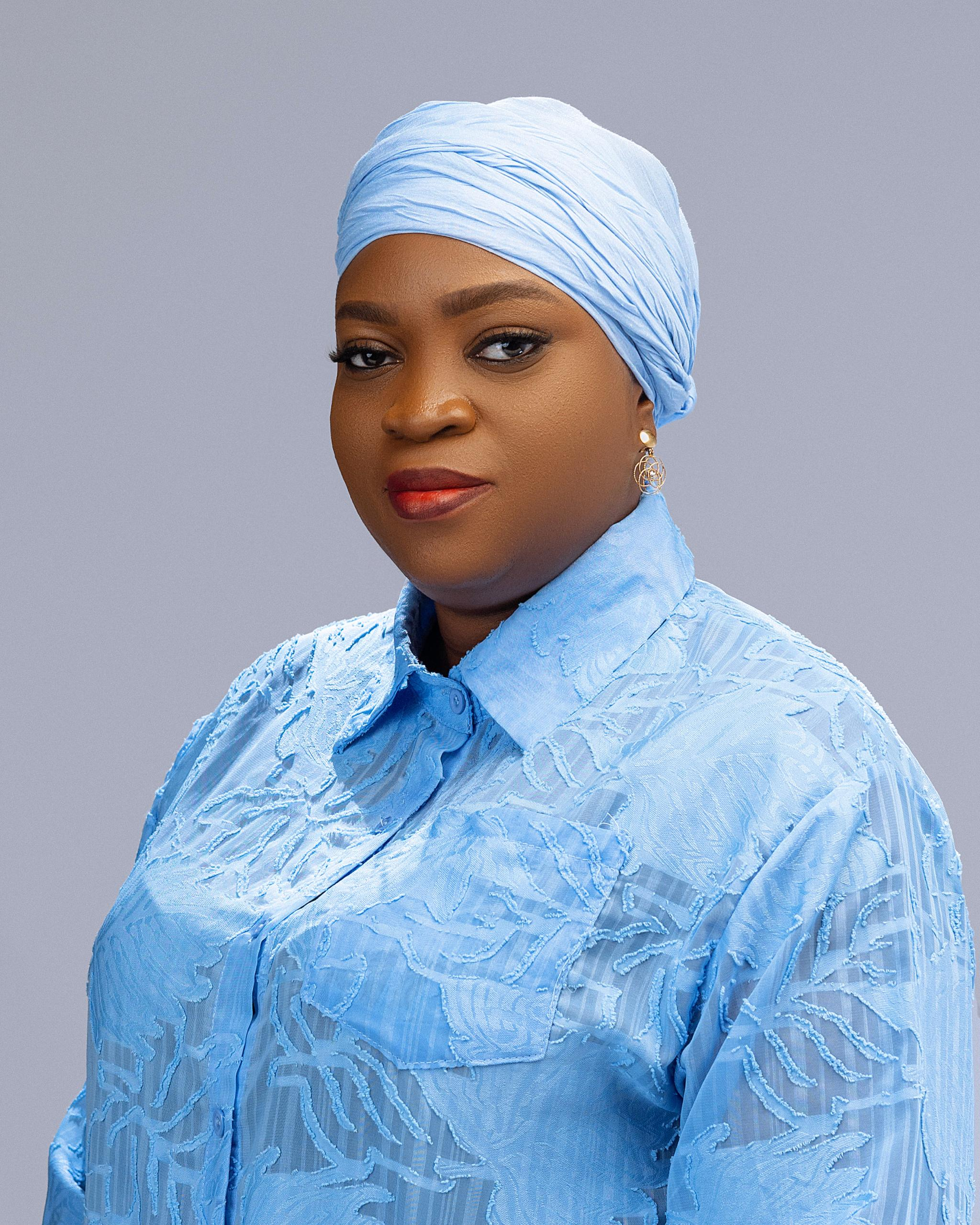
- Gbadebo-Alogba, 2025

Chairman, Ijede LCDA
- Assumed role July 2021 – July 2029
- Preceded by: Fatiu Salisu

Personal details
- Born: Motunrayo Adijat Gbadebo; 1 April 1990 (age 36)
- Party: All Progressives Congress
- Spouse: Azeem Alogba
- Occupation: Administrator; politician

Motunrayo Gbadebo-Alogba (née Monturayo Adijat Gbadebo; born 1 April 1990) is a public administrator and politician. She is the chairman of Ijede LCDA in Ikorodu division of Lagos.

== Early life and education ==
Gbadebo-Alogba was born into the family of Otunba Wasiu Gbadebo and Yeye Fausat Gbadebo, who was the pioneer chairperson of Ijede LCDA and former Woman Leader of APC in Lagos East.

Gbadebo-Alogba attended Lagos State Model College, Igbokuta to complete her secondary education. She holds a first degree in political science from Lagos State University (LASU), where she also obtained her M.Sc. She is currently a PhD student.

== Career ==
Gbadebo-Alogba worked briefly as an Administrative Officer with Federal Capital Development Authority, Abuja before venturing into business.

Gbadebo-Alogba emerged chairman of Ijede LCDA in 2021 at the age of 31, making her the youngest local government chairman in Lagos.

Gbadebo-Alogba formerly served as vice chairman in Ijede LCDA before emerging the council chairman. In December 2022, Gbadebo-Alogba emerged as the Most Outstanding Young Person in Governance at the 2022 edition of Lagos Youth Awards which was held at Raddison Hotel in Lagos.

She was re-elected on July 12, 2025 and is now serving her second term in office.
