= Egbin Thermal Power Station =

Power generating station in Nigeria

Egbin Thermal Power Plant, Ijede
- Location of the Egbin Thermal Power Plant, Ijede in Nigeria
- Country: Nigeria
- Location: Egbin, Ikorodu, Lagos State
- Coordinates: 6°33′48″N 3°36′55″E
- Status: Operational
- Commission date: Unit 1: May, 1986; Unit 2: November, 1985; Unit 3: May, 1985; Unit 4:November, 1986; Unit 5: May, 1987; Unit 6: November, 1987

Thermal power station
- Primary fuel: Gas
- Secondary fuel: Oil

Power generation
- Units operational: 6 x 220 MW
- Make and model: Hitachi/Emerson
- Nameplate capacity: 1,320 MW

External links
- Commons: Related media on Commons

Egbin Power Plc is the largest power generating station in Nigeria, with an installed capacity of 1,320 MW consisting of 6 Units of 220MW each. The station is located at Ijede / Egbin, in Ikorodu. It is about 40 km north east of the city of Lagos, and is situated on low land in Egbin & Ijede and bounded by the lagoon to the south, Agura/Gberigbe to the north and situated in Ijede Local Council Development Area.

The government acquired most of the land for the project by resettling the inhabitants to Ipakan. The first unit of the plant was commissioned in July 1985, while the last was commissioned in September 1986. The station is of reheat type with a high intermediate low pressure impulse reaction turbine design and a hydrogen cooled generator.

== History ==
Construction work started in 1982 by Marubeni Consortium which used Hitachi Company of Japan for the electric/mechanical and Bouygues of France for civil works. The first unit (Unit 3) was completed and commissioned on 13 May 1985 and the other five units were commissioned at six-monthly intervals. Upon completion of the ramp-structured edifice, the commissioning was carried out under the auspice of the then Head of States and commander-in-chief of the Armed Forces, General Ibrahim Badamasi Babangida.

The Egbin Thermal Power Plant is a gas-fired plant with six 220MW independent boiler turbine units. It can also runs on high pour guel oil (HPFO).

== Connections to power grid ==
Power generated is sent to the national grid by three main transmission lines: Ikeja West (330 kV) line; Ajah (330 kV) line and Ikorodu (132 kV) line.

== Key events ==
=== Privatisation ===
After a series of negotiations and payment of $407.3 million, the Federal Government of Nigeria handed over Egbin Thermal Power Plant to the core investor, a joint venture between Sahara Power Group and KEPCO, on 1 November 2013. The first attempt at privatising Egbin Power plant was in May 2007 when KEPCO Energy Resources offered to pay $280 million to acquire 51 per cent shares of the company. As confirmation of their interest KEPCO paid $28 million, being the initial payment of 10 percent of the bid price.

As a result of unresolved issues, such as power purchase and gas supply agreement, the process was halted.

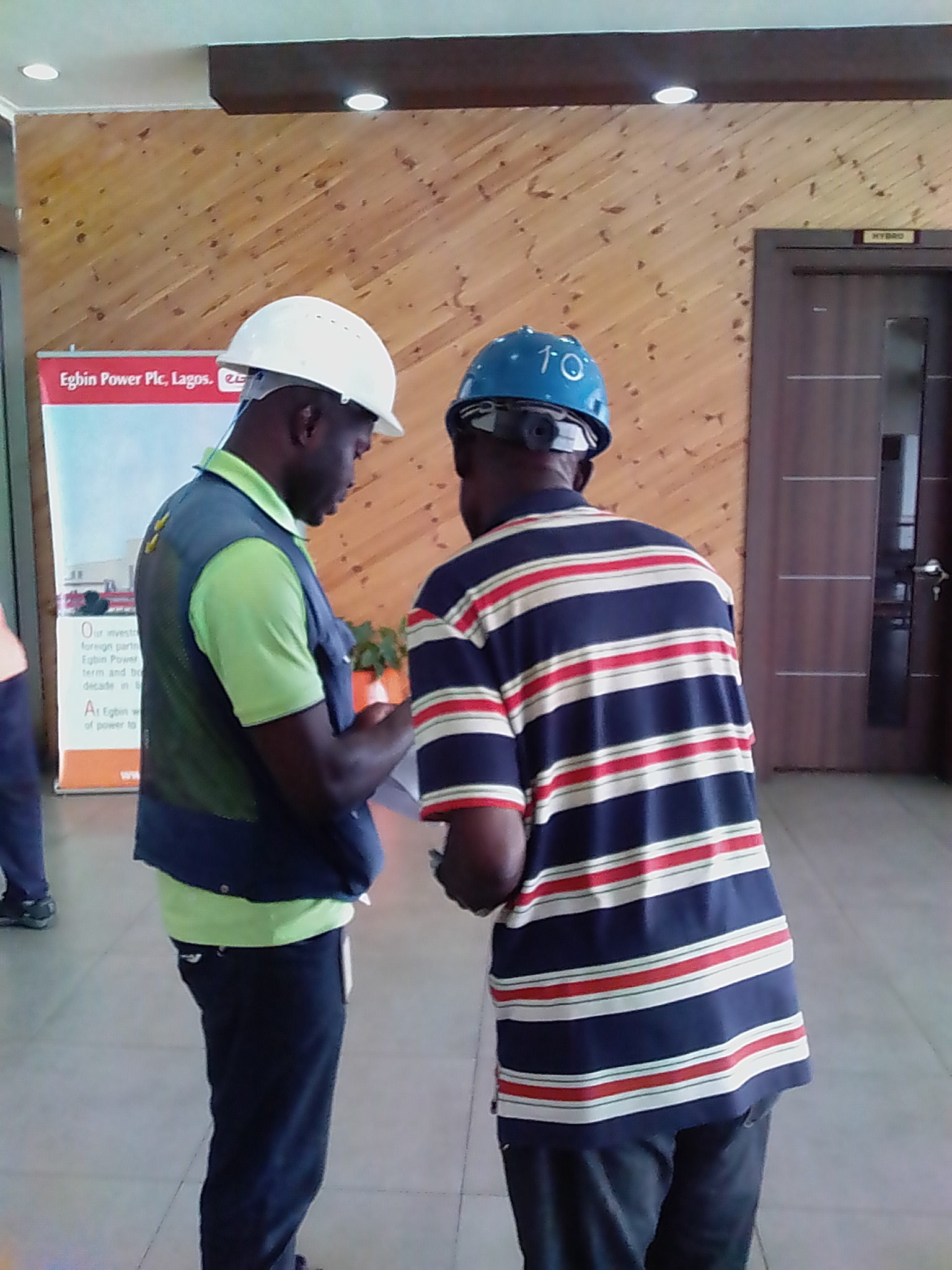
Egbin Thermal Power Station admin section

In 2013, in continuation of the 2007 agreement between the Federal Government of Nigeria and KEPCO, the South Korean power company was granted approval to acquire an additional 19 percent of the plant at a new valuation. National Council on Privatisation approved the transaction while the Bureau of Public Enterprises handled the sale process. The bureau set a deadline for the payment of $407.3 million (about N63.95 billion), which was the new price at which 70% of the plant was valued.

=== Rehabilitation of unit ===
The rehabilitation of Unit Six (ST-06) in Egbin, which suffered a boiler tube explosion in 2006, began in November, 2014 and was completed in January, 2015. This rehabilitation restored the plant back to its full capacity of 1320MW and was carried out by Hitachi.

Korea Electrical Power Nigeria Limited currently serves as a technical partner to Sahara Power Group with the goal of overhauling all the units in the plant, while achieving 85 percent power availability and 34 percent efficiency.

In early March 2016, the plant's management warned that it might have to close due to financial strains.

== See also ==
- Obateru of Egbin's Royal Palace
