= Agbowa-Ikosi =

Town in Lagos, Nigeria

- Interactive map of Agbowa-Ikosi
- Coordinates: 6°39′N 3°43′E
- Country: Nigeria
- State: Lagos
- LGA: Ekpe

Government
  - LCDA Chairman: Hon. Anomo Wale Raji
  - Abowa of Agbowa-Ikosi: H.R.M Oba Saheed Owolabi Momson

Population (2006)
  - Total: 107,283
- Time zone: UTC1 (WAT)

Agbowa-Ikosi is an ancient town in the Nigerian state of Lagos. On it lies the second biggest asphalt concrete road in Nigeria.

== History ==
Agbowa-Ikosi started from a place known today as Egunbesawo. The town is divided into several districts (Itun); Aledo, Oriwu, Agbowa, Kosomi (no water) and Ehindi. Each district is governed by their chief-head known as Olori Itun and generally by a single head of the town known as the Olu-Ilu, which was transformed into Baleeship and later to Kingship.

In 1956, His Royal Highness, Oba Edward Alausa Thomas OLUFUWA was crowned the first king of Agbowa-Ikosi, from the Oguntolu-Olufuwa Ruling House. Five houses agreed to rule over the town. While suburban villages such as Ikosi, Igbene, Oko-Ito, Oke-Olisa, Gberigbe and others are governed by Baale (who reports to the paramount King with the title of Abowa of Agbowa-Ikosi). Other chiefs who assisted the king are classified according to their grades such as Chief Olisa, who is the next in command to the king. Others are Chief Aro, Oluwo, Odofin and Balogun.

During the warring period, Agbowa-Ikosi was the headquarter of the then Ikosi District Council. It served as a refuge town for people from towns such as Imota, Ibefun, Ota and Owu. The people of Imota settled at Ago-Mota, Ibefun people at Ago-Ibefun, Ota people at Ago-Ota and Owu people at Ago-Owu. After the war, most refugees returned to their settlement. A few remained except for the people of Owu (majorly warriors), who promised not to cause Agbowa-Ikosi any trouble.

== Geography ==
Agbowa-Ikosi lies 35 kilometers north of Epe Division, on the south bank of a creek that extends parallel to the sea from Lagos to Ikorodu, with a mixture of indigenes and non-indigenes.

Some towns and villages surrounding Agbowa-Ikosi are: Ota-Ikosi, Ikosi Beach, Orugbo-Iddo, Igbalu, IGBENE, Oke-Olisa, Gberigbe, Oko-Ito, Imope, Imota, Odo Ayandelu Ado-Ikosi, Owu, Iganke etc.

== Festival ==
Agbowa-Ikosi is the first town within Epe division and Ijebuland that sets aside days for the celebration of the town and notable sons and daughters. This event is tagged Agbowa Day Celebration, and its coordinated by Agbowa Development Association (ADA).

Agbo Remireke festival is an important festival of Agbowa-ikosi. It is celebrated once in three years during the Christmas period. This is a festival that bring together all children and folks of the town without the segregation of religious believes or any other entity. It is a rallying point for all and a period where the town is in a bright mood, coupled with the celebration mood of the Christmas and New Year Celebrations.

Eibi festival is another festival celebrated in Agbowa-Ikosi amongst others.

== Notables ==
Agbowa-Ikosi has been ruled by four rulers:

- Oba Edward Alausa Thomas OLUFUWA ruled from 1956 to 1972
- Oba Ahmed Kolawole Hassan ruled from 1973 to 2006
- Oba Akinlolu Bolaji Joseph Odumeru ruled from 2007 to 2012

== Economy ==
The people are mostly farmers and fishermen, accompanied by other commercial activities.

== Religion ==
Inhabitants of Agbowa-Ikosi include adherents to several religions, including Christianity, Islam, and traditional worship. But their co-existence is something worthy of envy. Because it is a town that has never registered any religious conflicts.
