= Obateru of Egbin's Royal Palace =

Royal palace in Ijede, Ikorodu, Lagos, Nigeria

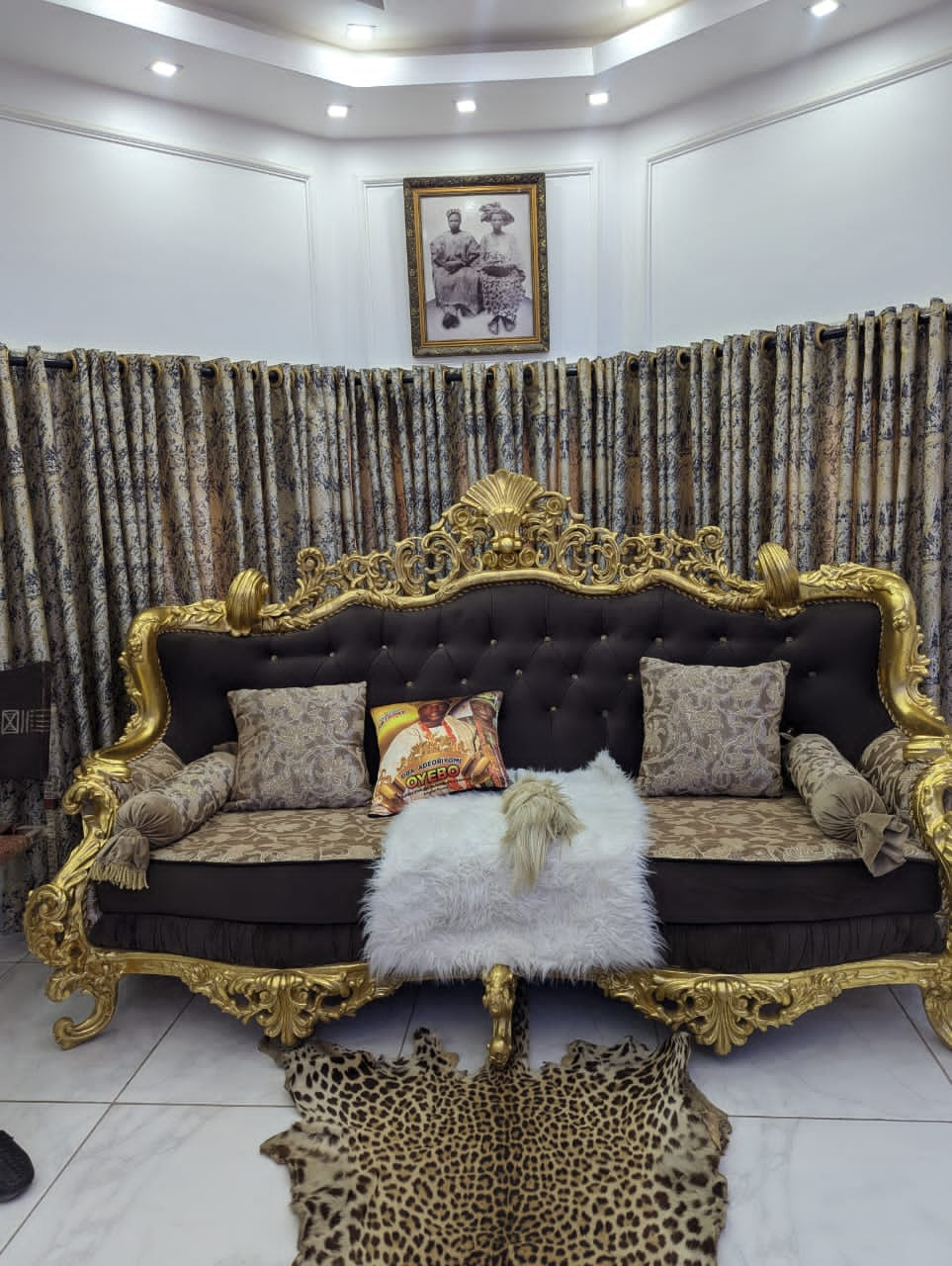
Obateru of Egbin Royal Seat

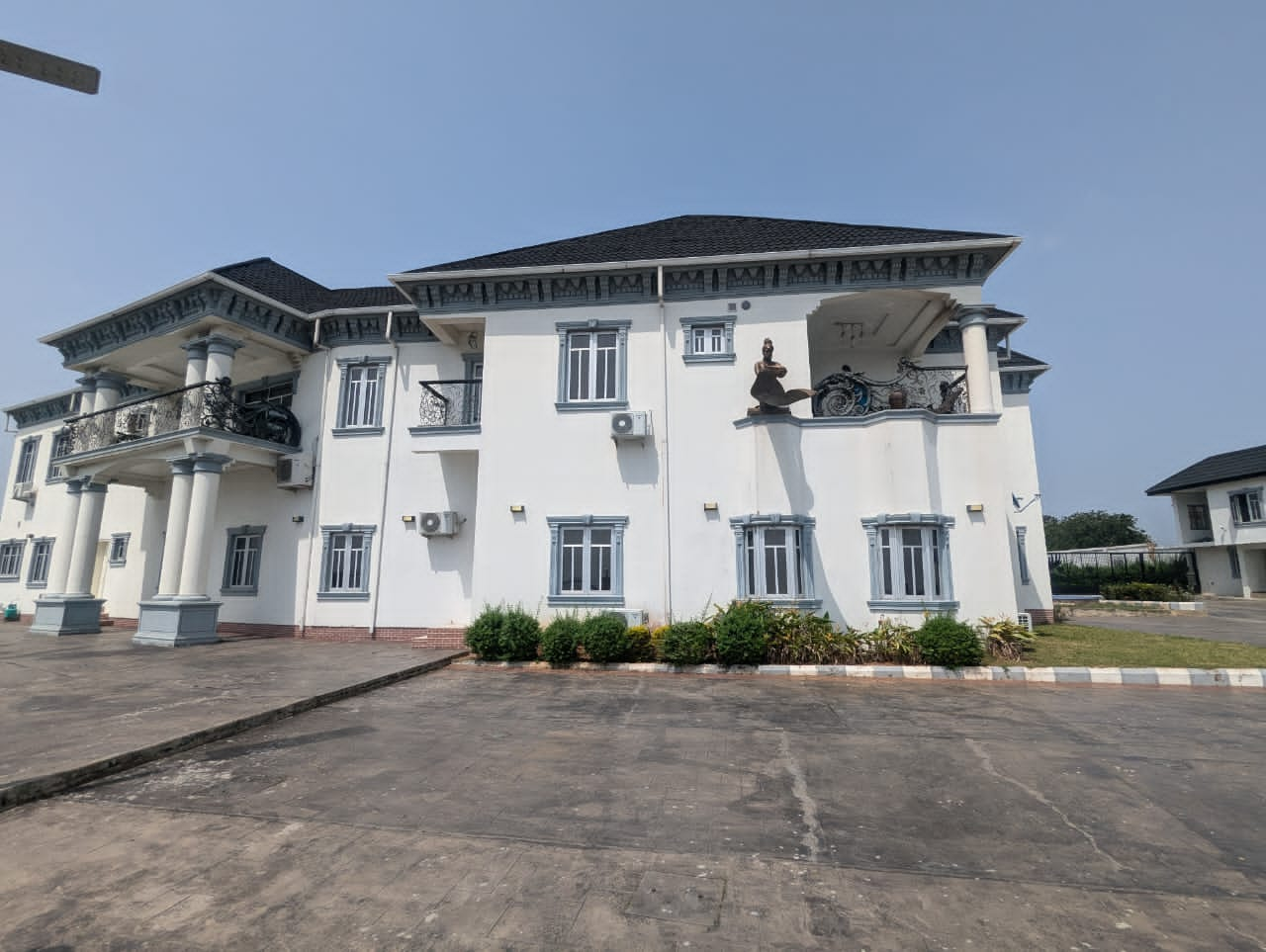
Royal Palace of Obateru of Egbin Kingdom

The Obateru of Egbin's Royal Palace is an edifice located in Egbin, Ijede LCDA, Ikorodu LGA, Lagos State, Nigeria. This palace, belonging to His Royal Majesty, Oba (Dr) Adeoriyomi Oluwasesan Abdul-Akeem Oyebo (arpa), Ademoyebo 111, is a significant landmark in the Egbin Kingdom and serves as the center of modern traditional authority for the community.

== Architectural Features ==
The royal palace, described as a castle, boasts a blend of modern and traditional designs, symbolizing both heritage and progress. It includes exquisite marble interiors, grand staircases, and extensive halls designed for royal ceremonies. The palace's strategic design not only reflects luxury but also represents a cultural and historical connection to the traditions of the Egbin people. It is said to be a tourist attraction, often lauded for its aesthetic appeal and serves as a focal point for the community during cultural and social gatherings. It is located opposite the Lagos lagoon and adjacent to the Egbin Thermal Power Station in Egbin.

== The Obateru of Egbin ==
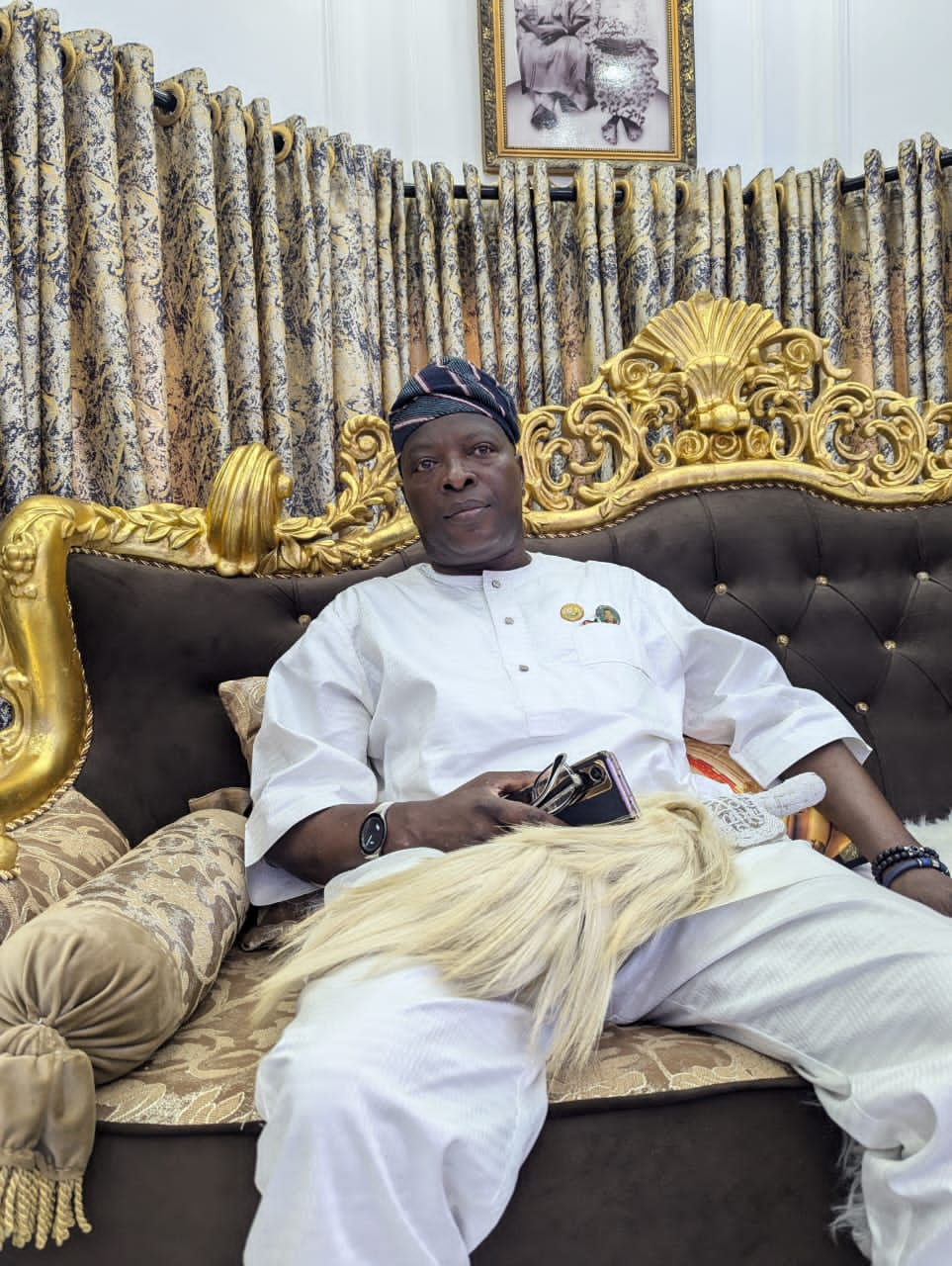
HRM, Oba Adeoriyomi O. A. Oyebo

Oba Adeoriyomi Oyebo III ascended the throne as the paramount ruler of Egbin Kingdom on the 22nd of April, 2010. He is a professional artist who holds a Doctorate degree in Public Leadership, Peace and Community Leadership from Honoris Causa of the European University of American.
