= Moyosore Ogunlewe =

Nigerian politician

Moyosore Ogunlewe is a Nigerian politician and lawyer who is currently the chairman of Kosofe Local Government.

== Education ==
Moyosore has a Bsc in Business Administration from the University of Lagos and Bachelor of Law from the University of Buckingham.

== Family ==
Moyosore is the son to Adeseye Ogunlewe, who was a former Minister of Works.

== Political career ==
Moyosore contested for the Lagos State House of Assembly election in 2015 and 2019 elections under the umbrella of the People Democratic Party (PDP) in Kosofe constituency 1. He lost the 2015 election to Bayo Osinowo and lost the 2019 election to Sanni Okanlawon. He joined the All Progressive Congress APC in 2019 He contested in the Lagos state chairmanship election for Kosofe Local Government under the umbrella of the All Progressive Congress APC and won emerging as the Executive Chairman of Kosofe Local government
