= Iledi Osugbo Abalaye, Ajina Square =

Pre-colonial Traditional Site in Lagos

Iledi Osugbo Abalaye
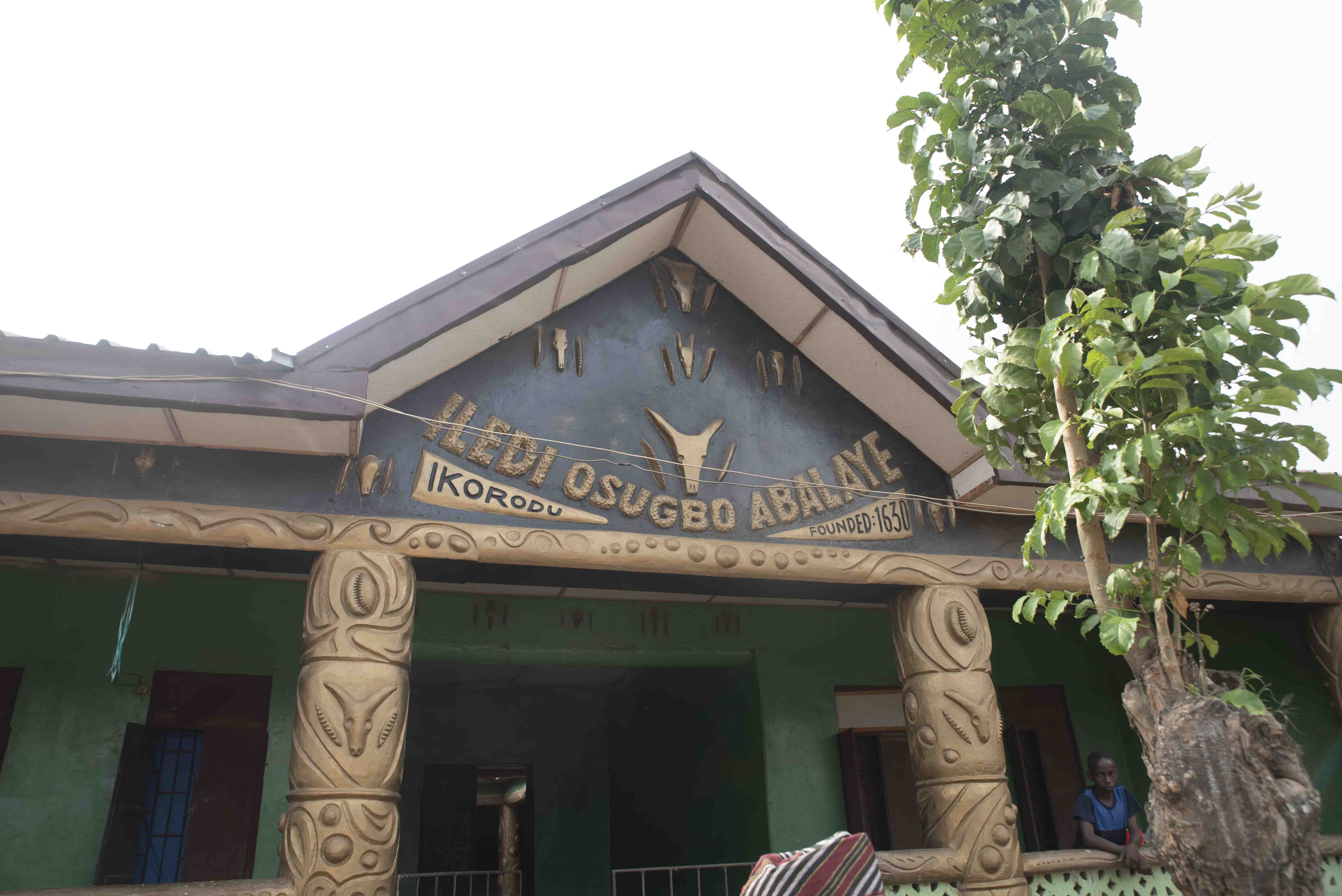
- Iledi Osugbo Abalaye Shrine
- Type: Sacred site
- Location: Ajina Square, Ijebu-Ode, Nigeria

Iledi Osugbo Abalaiye is a pre-colonial traditional site in Ajina Square in Ikorodu area of Lagos. It was built in 1810 by joint community effort and the building is used for the traditional rites and installation ceremonies of the Obas and Chiefs. The Iledi Osugbo plays a significant role in the history and origin of Ikorodu.

In 2019, the traditional coronation rites for the new Iyalode was done at the Iledi Osugbo Abalaiye in Ikorodu for a high powered traditional rite led by the Apena of Ikorodu.

The Iledi Osugbo site at Ejina market square area is what is considered a sacred space in Yoruba culture and tradition as it plays a role in maintaining local cultures and traditions in the state.

== Community relations ==
The sacred site is a place that provides a range of political and religious functions, including where rifts are settled. It serves as a Yoruba traditional court; whenever there are disputes between individuals, villages or towns, the matter is settled at Iledi oko and obo .

== Cultural significance of The Iledi Osugbo ==
=== Attire and regalia ===
Members of Iledi are easily identifiable by their distinctive white attire and the sticks they carry. This unique dress code is an important part of Iledi's tradition and cultural heritage.

=== Role in royal succession ===
Iledi plays a crucial role in the royal succession process of Ikorodu. The Oba-elect is kept at Iledi for three months in a rite known as Ipebi, during which time he undergoes initiation and indoctrination into the traditions and customs of the land. All sacrifices and rituals necessary for the Oba-elect's coronation are carried out at Iledi.

=== Cult groups ===
Iledi is home to several cult groups, each with its own distinct operations and traditions. These groups are categorized into three main types: Owopa, Osugbo, and the Reformed Fraternity. The Reformed Fraternity is unique in that it is composed of wealthy individuals.

== See also ==
- Nigerian confraternity
- African Traditional religion
- Oba Ayangbure's Place
