= Ogunleye Gbolahan Adetokunbo =

Nigerian politician

Hon. Ogunleye Gbolahan Adetokunbo

Member, Lagos State House of Assembly
- Incumbent
- Assumed office 2023
- Constituency: Ikorodu Constituency I

Personal details
- Party: All Progressives Congress (APC)
- Parent: Prince Abiodun Ogunleye (father)
- Education: Lagos State University (B.Sc)
- Occupation: Politician
- Website: Lagos Assembly Profile

Ogunleye Gbolahan Adetokunbo (also known as OGA) is a Nigerian politician who currently serves as a member of the Lagos State House of Assembly, representing Ikorodu Constituency I.

== Early life and education ==
Ogunleye is the son of Prince Abiodun Ogunleye, a politician who served as the Deputy Governor of Lagos State under Governor Bola Tinubu.

He pursued his higher education at Lagos State University (LASU), Ojo, where he obtained a Bachelor of Science (B.Sc.) degree in economics.

== Political career ==
Ogunleye's political career is based in the Ikorodu Division of Lagos State. In May 2022, he secured the All Progressives Congress (APC) ticket for Ikorodu Constituency I, defeating the incumbent House Majority Leader Sanai Agunbiade, in the primary election.

He went on to win the general election in 2023 to represent the constituency in the Lagos State House of Assembly.

Upon his inauguration into the 10th Assembly, he was appointed as the Chairman of the House Committee on Overseas Investments and Sustainable Development Goals (SDGs).
