= Oba Ayangbure's Palace =

Seat of the monarch of Ikorodu, Nigeria

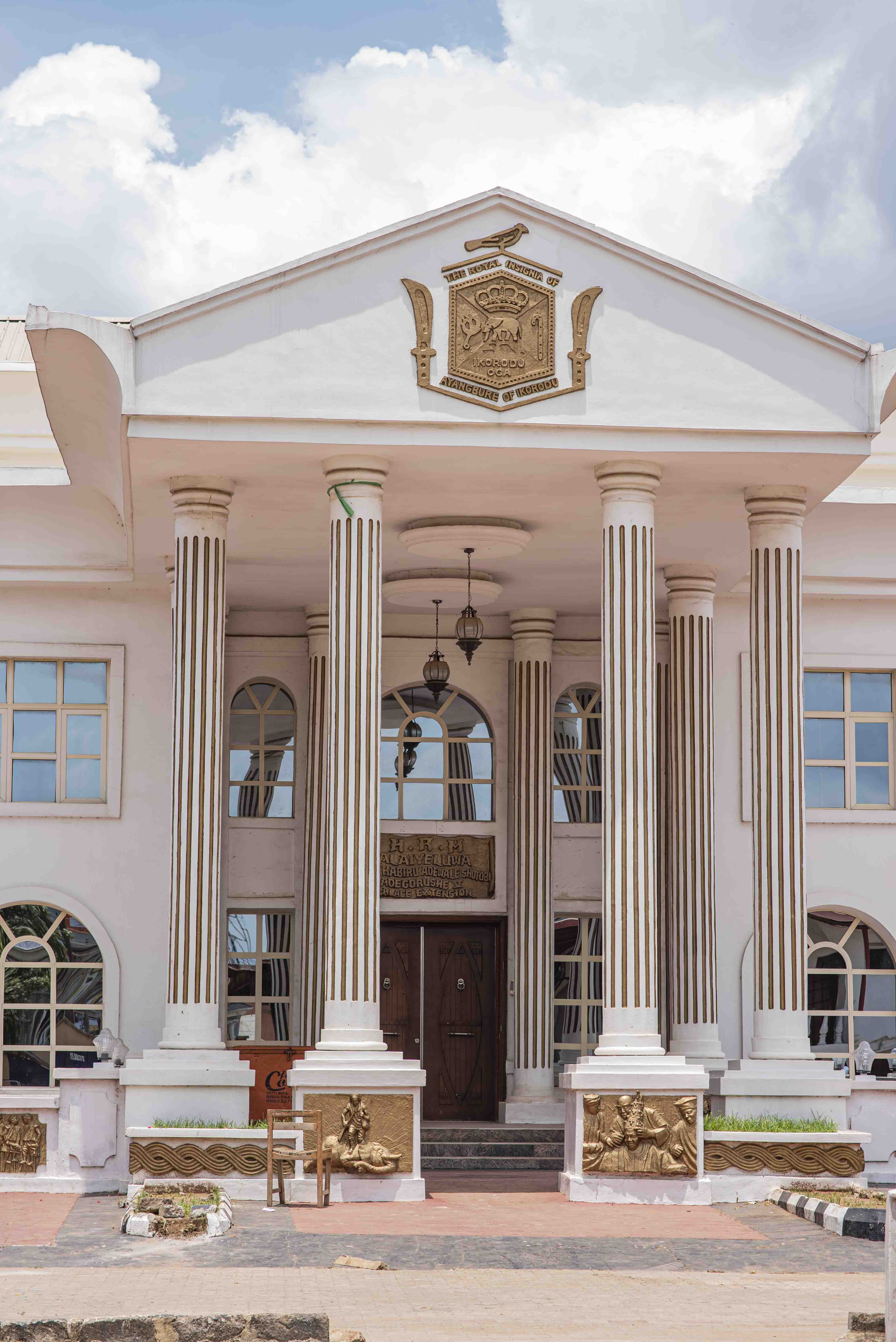
Royal Palace of Ayangbure of Ikorodu

Oba Ayangbure's Palace

The Ayangburen Palace serves as the traditional seat of the monarch of Ikorodu, one of the five divisions of Lagos State, Nigeria. It is the official residence of the Oba Ayangburen of Ikorodu, the paramount ruler of the Ikorodu people. The palace is an important cultural, political, and spiritual center, reflecting the heritage and authority of the Oba.

== History ==
The Ayangburen throne has been a significant institution in the Ikorodu region for centuries. The title is passed down through generations, and the throne plays a vital role in maintaining order and unity in the community. The current monarch, HRM Oba (Engr.) Kabiru Adewale Shotobi, Adegorushe V, ascended to the throne on May 25, 2015, following the approval of the Lagos State Executive Council, the then state governor - Governor Babatunde Raji Fasola gave him the staff of office, marking the beginning of a new chapter in the town's history.

== The Palace ==
In 2018, the Ayangburen Palace underwent significant renovations, which included the commissioning of a new palace complex by then Governor of Lagos State, Akinwunmi Ambode. The new structure was designed to combine modernity with traditional Yoruba architectural elements, representing a blend of the old and the new. The renovated palace also aimed to enhance the monarch's ability to perform his royal duties and provide a more fitting environment for royal ceremonies and gatherings. The palace is a site of pride for the people of Ikorodu and stands as a cultural and historical landmark. The palace is located at 50 Ayangbure, Ikorodu Rd, Lagos.

=== Cultural Role ===
The palace is a focal point for various cultural activities, including traditional festivals, coronations, and community events. One of the major cultural festivals hosted by the Oba at palace is the Odun-Osu. Oba Ayangbure has played a pivotal role in promoting cultural heritage and unity within Ikorodu. His advocacy for the preservation of the region's traditions was particularly evident in his 2019 speech urging indigenes to actively participate in and uplift their cultural practices. The monarch emphasized the importance of passing down cultural values to younger generations to maintain the identity of Ikorodu and its people.

Additionally, the palace serves as a meeting ground for other royal figures in the region. In 2018, Oba Kabiru Shotobi hosted a grand reception for 30 Ijebu Obas, further cementing his status as an influential leader in the Yoruba kingdom. These gatherings highlight the significance of the palace not only as a symbol of Ikorodu's heritage but also as a hub for regional collaboration and royal diplomacy.

== See also ==
- Ikorodu
- Iledi Osugbo Abalaye, Ajina Square
- Obateru of Egbin's Royal Palace
