= Agemo festival =

Yoruba festival

Agemo Festival
- Language: Yoruba

Origin
- Meaning: Local Wrestling
- Region of origin: Yoruba Region, Nigeria

Agemo Festival is a masked or masquerade festival traditionally held in many Yoruba cities but more popularly linked with the Ijebu people of Ogun State. The festival and accompanying rituals are celebrated to honor the spirit deity Agemo, who is believed to be a protector of children and who safeguards Ijebus future through its blessing. The festival is linked with the traditional Yoruba religion, in particular, the practices of the Agemo cult and as such, issues like restriction of movement during certain periods of the festival do occur.

== Festival ==
The festival is mostly celebrated during between the months of June and August, and historically coincided with the harvesting of maize by Ijebu farmers. The period of the festival takes seven days and the beginning period is fixed after a consultative meeting between the Awujale of Ijebu and the heads of the sixteen recognized or titled agemos also called Olofas. The festival was historically preceded by seven days of chants by the Oro cult and the beating of drums to 'gbedu' music. Thereafter, sixteen agemo masquerades from different villages proceed to their shrine at Imosan, via Ijebu-Ode on an annual pilgrimage. Each agemo carries items such as feathers and ram's horns on the head and are followed by some agemo followers. It is considered a taboo for a woman to see the agemo masquerade during their procession to Imosan. On their pilgrimage, the agemo masquerade stops to receive gifts and offer prayers to residents.

At Imosan, the masquerades receive additional gifts sent by the Awujale, they spend three days at the Agemo shrine performing traditional religious rites and appeasement of the agemo deity. On their last day at Imosan, a traditional agemo ritual dance is performed this time, it can be witnessed by both men and women. The masquerades will then move to Ijebu-Ode to perform the final rites of the festival. The festival ends with the dance by the leader of the agemo, 'Tami Onire' before the Awujale and further public dances by the other agemos.

The agemo festival is an old ritual performance among the Ijebus, historically, the agemo priests were part of the intellectual life of Ijebu and over the years, conflicting ideas about how many titled agemos are recognized or how the rituals should be performed emerged. Though, many recognize 16 agemo titles, there exist more, while the Awujale's in modern times are either Muslims or Christians and does not stop them from fulfilling many historical roles.

== Mythological origin & rituals ==
The festival is tied to the myth of Agemo, believed to be the son of Obatala. A conflict arose when Agemo married someone against Obatala's wishes, leading to the withdrawal of Agemo's magical powers. This rendered him unable to restore his body during a magical act, resulting in termites consuming his intestines and leaving him with a deformity. Despite his deformity, Agemo's courage and ingenuity helped him conceal his condition with a raffia mat. His resilience and tolerance led to the institutionalization of his worship.The Agemo masquerade, represented publicly by a raffia mat that moves independently, is a strictly male domain, with women forbidden from witnessing or participating in its activities.The festival includes the Agere stilt dancers, various propitiations, and prayers for the well-being of the community.The festival features musical performances with drums like the Esi (a raffia-covered drum) and Aran-Ogida. The community believes that observing the festival prevents outbreaks of epidemics, wards off evil, and ensures adequate rainfall.

== See also ==
- Eyibi Festival
- Eluku Festival
