= Asa Festival =

Nigerian Cultural Festival

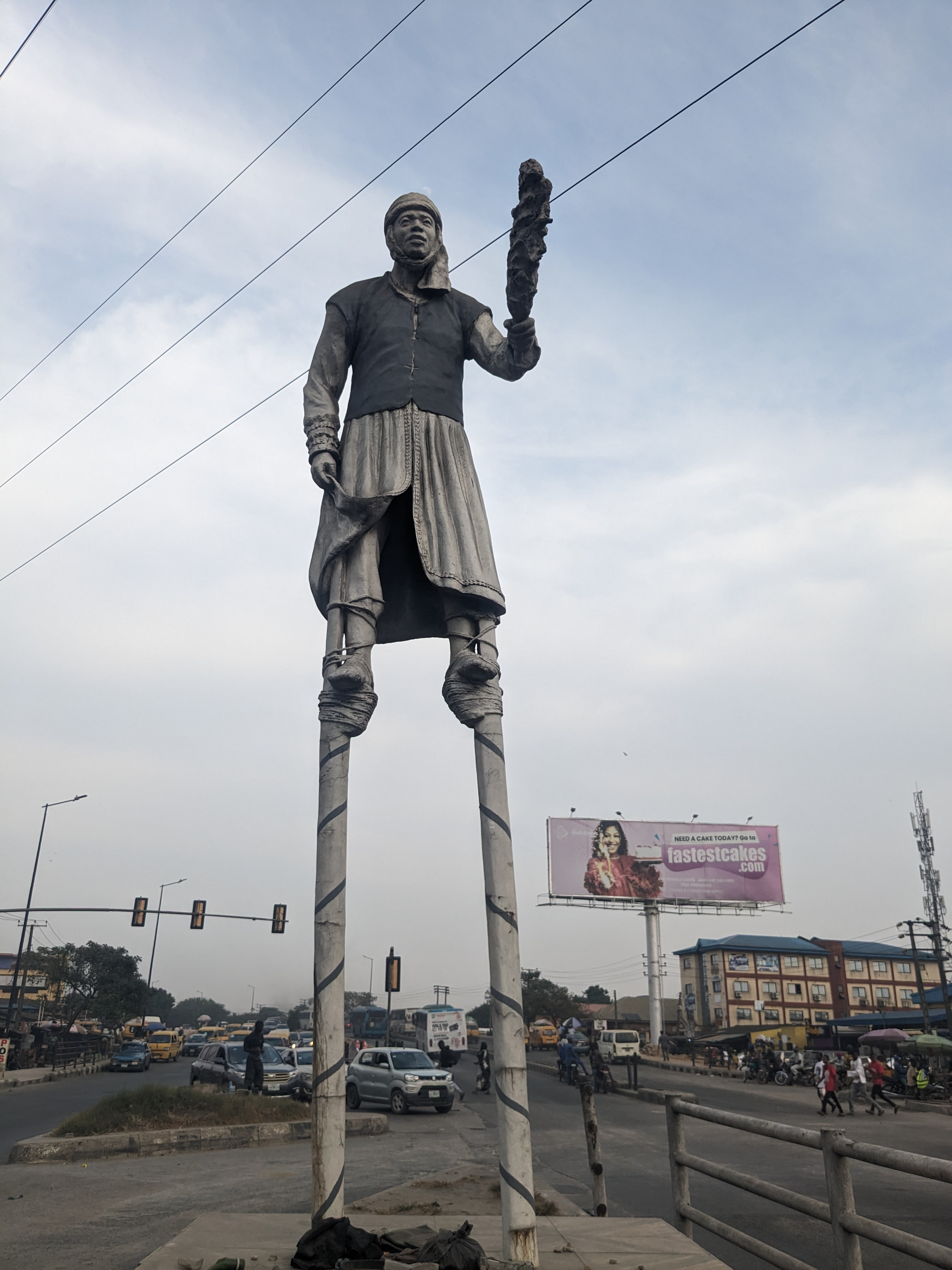
- Language: Yoruba

Origin
- Meaning: statue
- Region of origin: Western Region, Nigeria

The Asa Festival, known locally as Agere, is a festival in Ikorodu, Lagos State, Nigeria is an event promoting the traditional stilt-walking unique to the region. It is operated by the Ikorodu Division Rebirth Foundation (IREP) and supported by community leaders, including the Ayangburen of Ikorodu, Oba Kabiru Shotobi. The festival features various cultural displays, including the launch of "Asa Arokolo," a book detailing its historical significance.

The festival is centered on the Asa masquerade, involving performers walking on tall stilts while performing dances and acrobatics. This was historically used for communal entertainment, spiritual observances and as a symbol of the community's identity. The festival was first held in 2017, and was recognized by the Government of Lagos State in the same year as one of its yearly cultural festivals. IREP is led by the Majority Leader of the Lagos State House of Assembly and representative of the Ikorodu Constituency I Sanai Agunbiade.
