= Igunnuko Festival =

Festival in Nigeria

Igunnuko festival
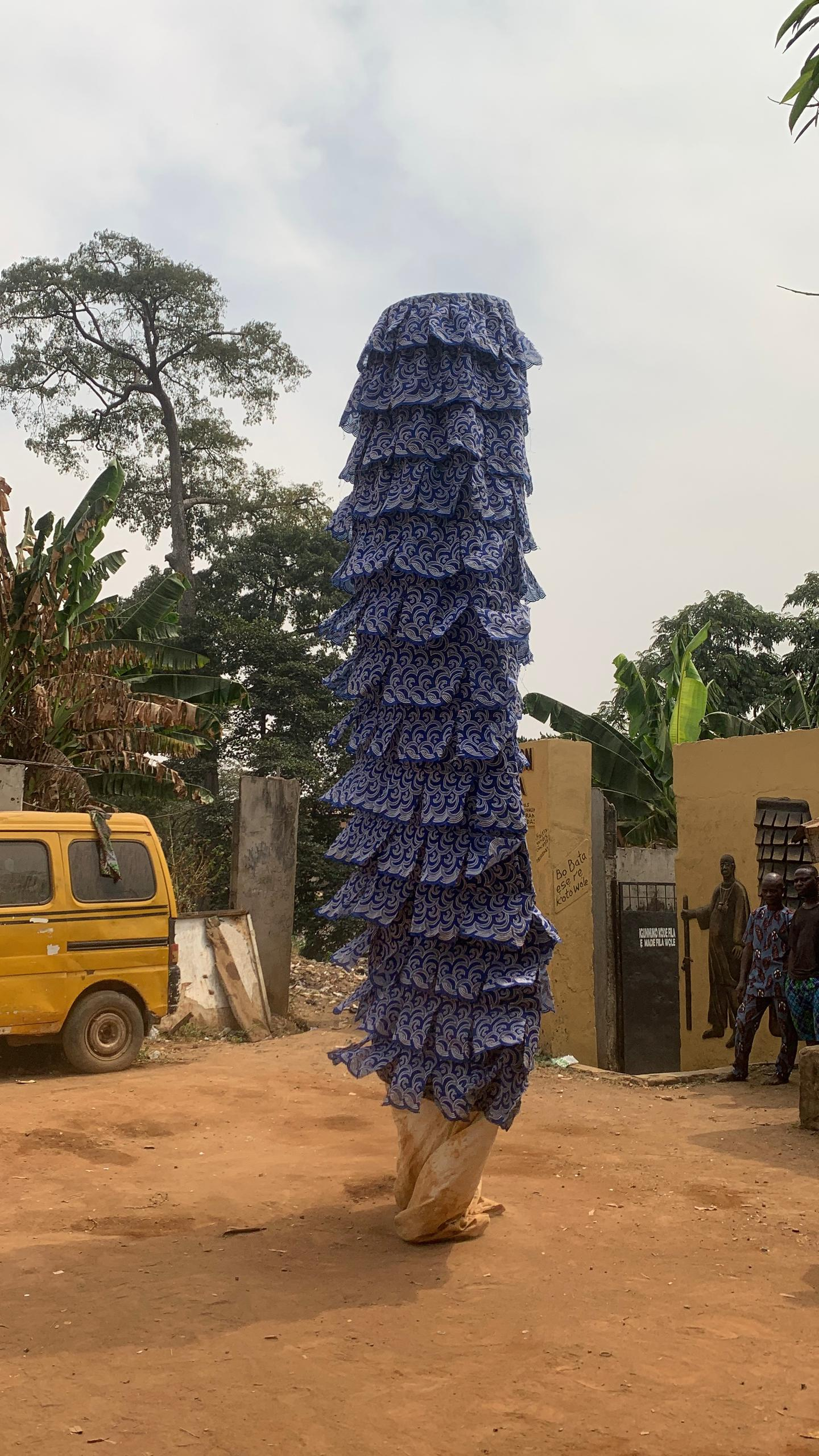
- Igunnuko masquerede
- Begins: Date vary yearly
- Venue: Lagos State

Igunnuko Festival is the celebration of the tallest masquerade in the world. The masquerade emanates from the Nupe, Niger Kogi, Kwara state and Abuja in Nigeria. In the Yoruba tradition, when the Igunnuko masquerade emerged at festivals or ritual ceremonies, they are believed to be deities.

The Igunnuko masquerade dance is performed once annually during the Igunnu festival. This, no doubt, attests to the fact that Nigerian culture encompasses the belief in their ‘gods’ to cure certain diseases.

== Description ==
The festival starts when all these are ready. The young and old men (alone) will go to uproot a living tree. This is called Kuso and when they are returning from Kuso, any place that trees are dragged or passed with means a lot.

When the festival is on, the Igunnuko masquerades are seen. The Igunnuko dresses in robes on stilts, it is a very tall figure and is also a secret cult used to hunt witches. It parades the streets and visits important personality in the community.

== Igunnuko Festival in Lagos ==
The Igunnuko Cult was introduced to Lagos in 1814 by Yaisa Ayani, who brought the practice from his hometown in Pategi, Niger State. Initially, the cult was established at Ayani's residence in Odo-Oba (Oju-Oto), where he performed rituals using ingredients he had acquired. As the cult grew, Ayani sought the assistance of Chief I. Oshodi Tapa, a prominent Nupe war chief in Lagos, who provided him with a new location for the cult's shrine, known as "Igbo-Igunnu Epetedo".This site has remained the cult's headquarters to the present day while it is established in other divisions across Lagos division.
