= Kosofe =

- LGA and town
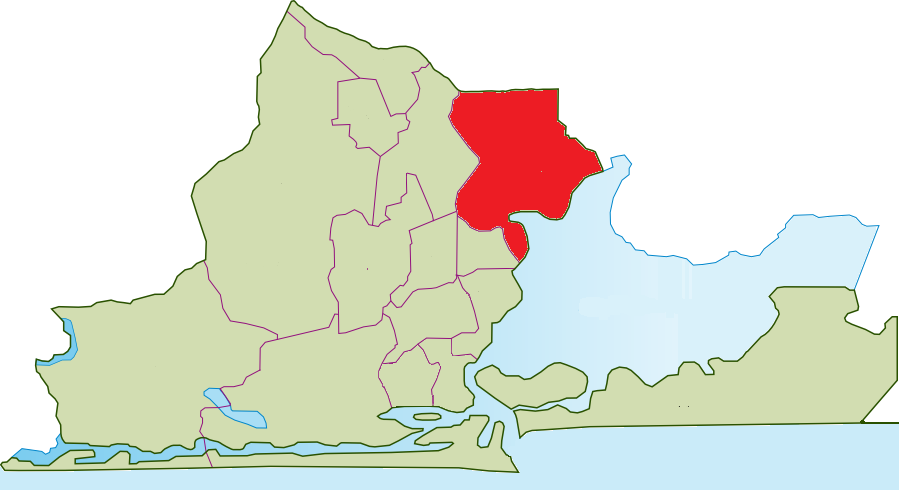
- Kosofe within Lagos Metropolitan Area
- Interactive map of Kosofe
- Country: Nigeria
- State: Lagos State

Government
  - Local government chairman: Barr. Moyosore Ogunlewe

Area
  - Total: 81 km^{2} (31 sq mi)

Population (2022)
  - Total: 1,010,800
  - Density: 12,000/km^{2} (32,000/sq mi)
- Time zone: UTC+1 (WAT)
- 3-digit postal code prefix: 100
- ISO 3166 code: NG.LA.KO

Kosofe is a town and Local Government Area of Lagos State, Nigeria and was created on 27 November 1996. Its headquarters is in the town of Kosofe and is home to several neighborhoods, including Ketu, Oworonshoki, Agboyi-Ketu, Alapere, Mile 12, and Isheri Olowora. Other notable areas include Ifako/Soluyi, Ajao Estate, Mende, Maryland, Ojota, Ogudu, Agidi, Orisigun, Kosofe, Ajelogo, Akanimodo, Ikosi-Ketu, Agiliti, Maidan, Isheri-Olowo Ira, Shangisha, Magodo, Agboyi, Owode Onirin, and Odo-Ogun.

It has an area of 81 km^{2} (31 sq mi) and a population of 682,772 according to the 2006 census. The local government has a diverse population, with people from different ethnic and religious backgrounds living together.

The postal code of the area is 100. There are also several markets, parks, and recreational facilities in Kosofe local government. Popular festivals held in Kosofe Local Government Area include the Ogun and the Igunuko festivals while prominent traditional rulers in the area include the Ologudu of Ogudu and the Oba of Oworonshoki.

One of the major settlements in Kosofe is Ikosi.

Kosofe is well-connected to other parts of Lagos. The Lagos-Ibadan Expressway and the Third Mainland Bridge, which connect Lagos Island to the mainland, both pass through the local government. There are also several bus terminals and motor parks in the area, making it easy for residents to travel to other parts of Lagos State.

== Places at Kosofe ==
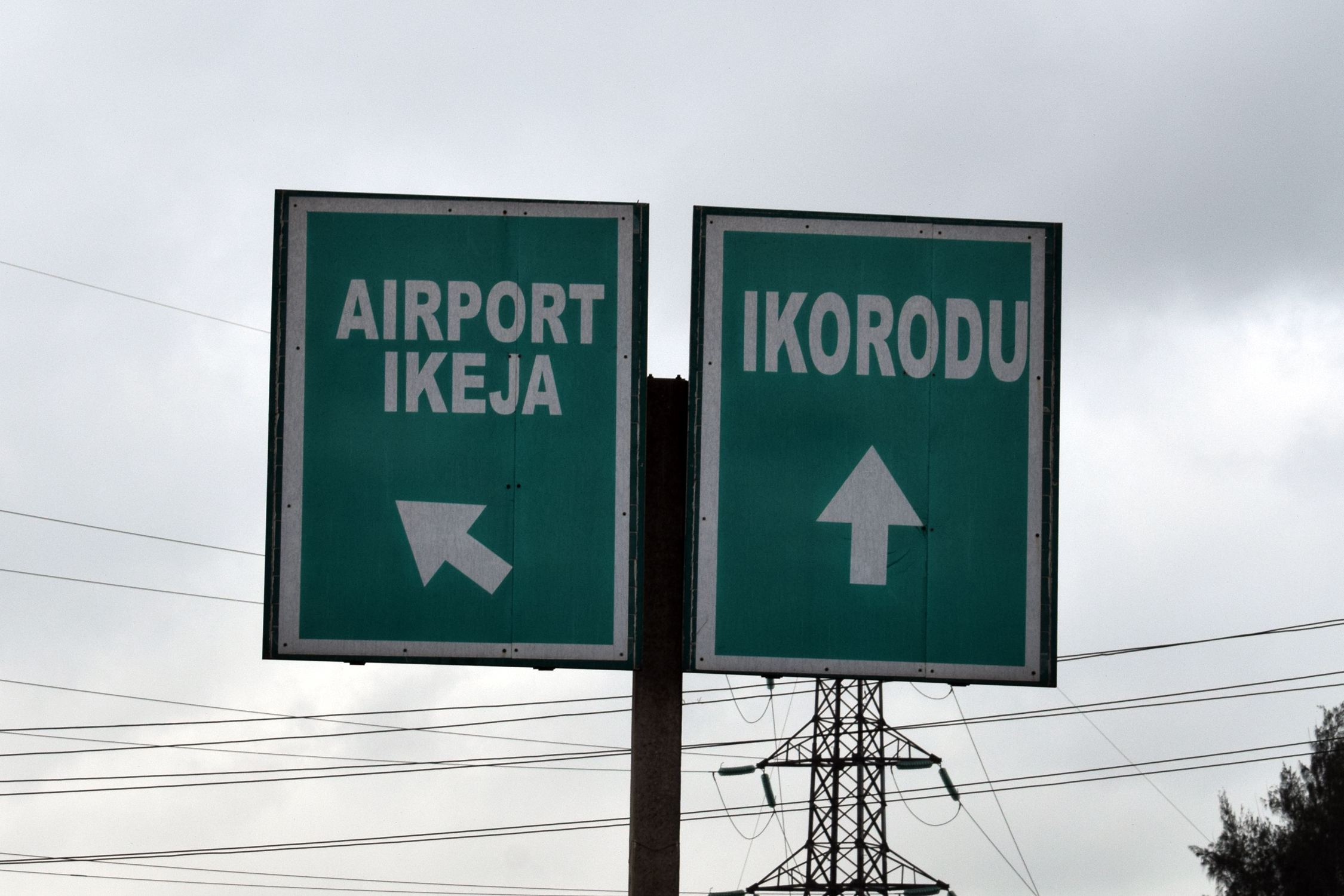
Description Signs in Maryland, Kosofe, Lagos-Nigeria

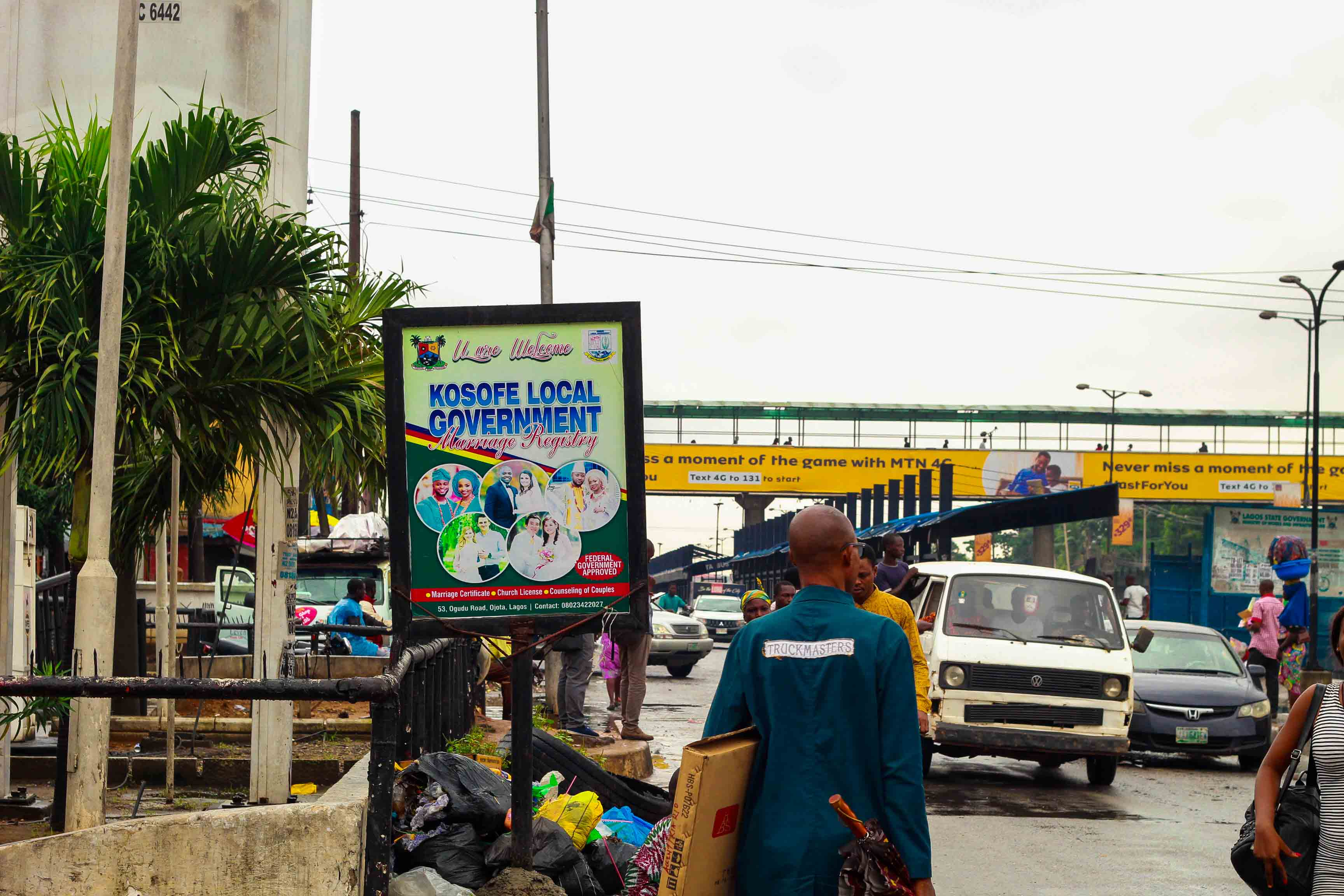
Kosofe Magistrate Court at Ojota

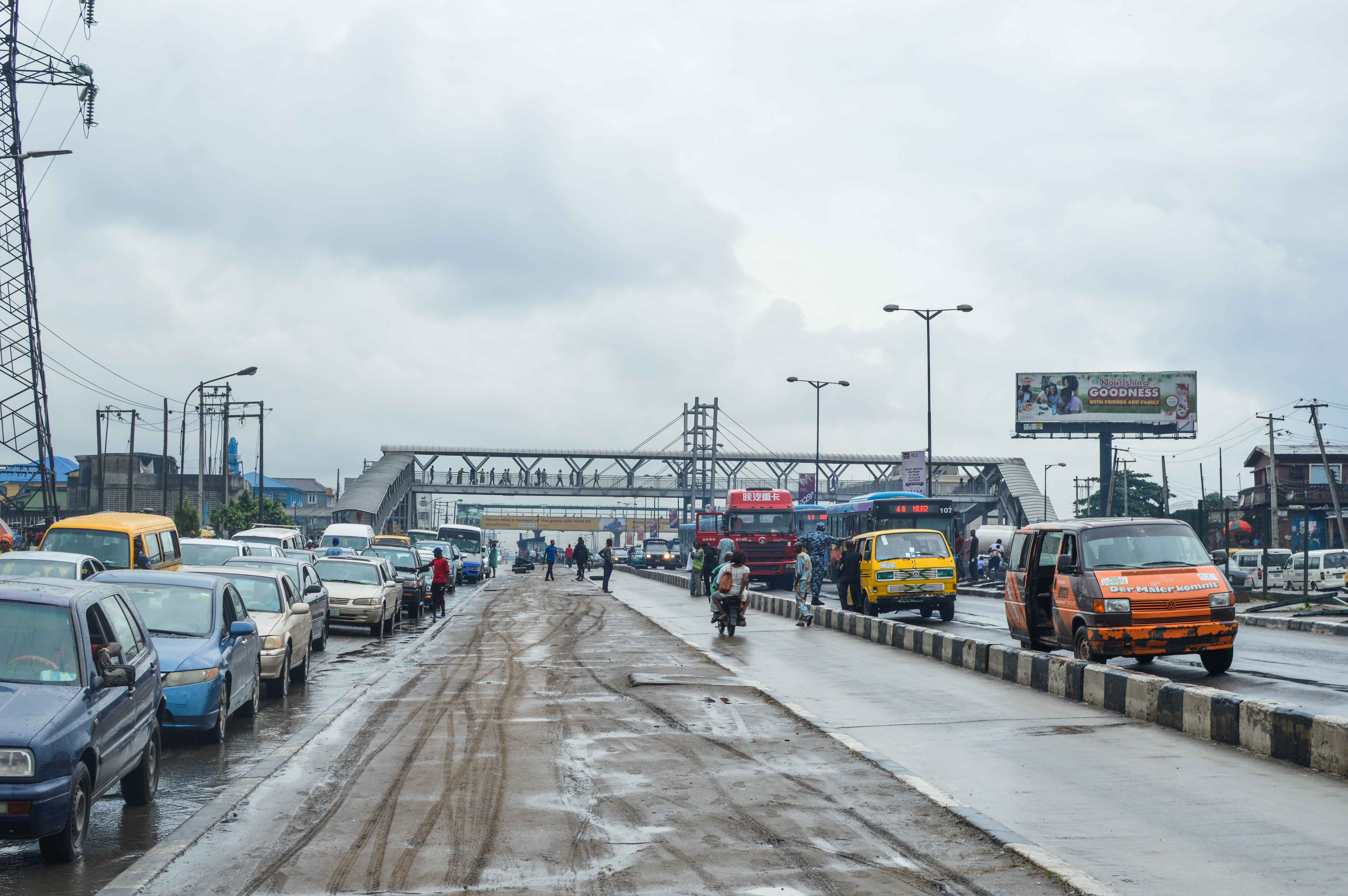
Ojota road

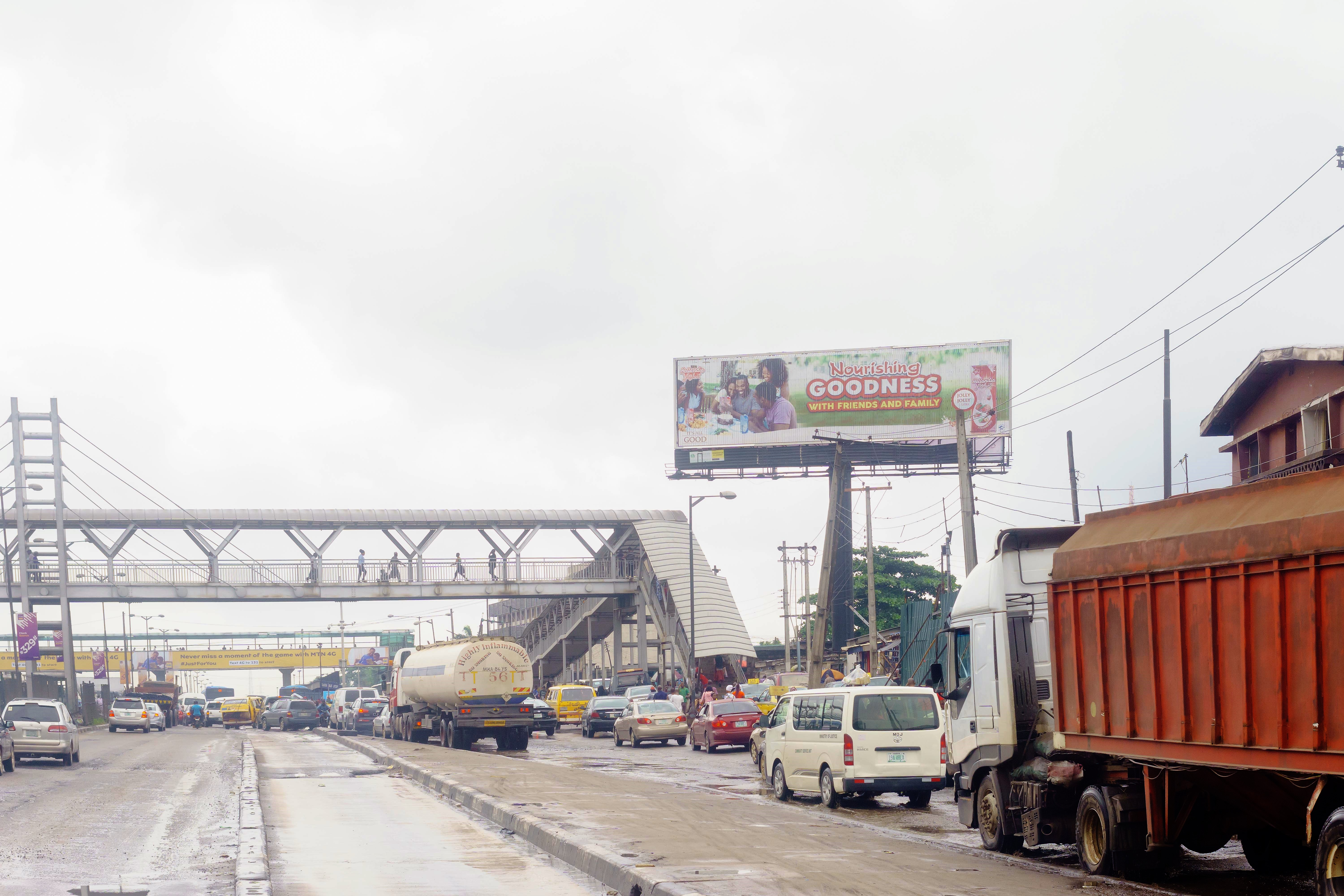

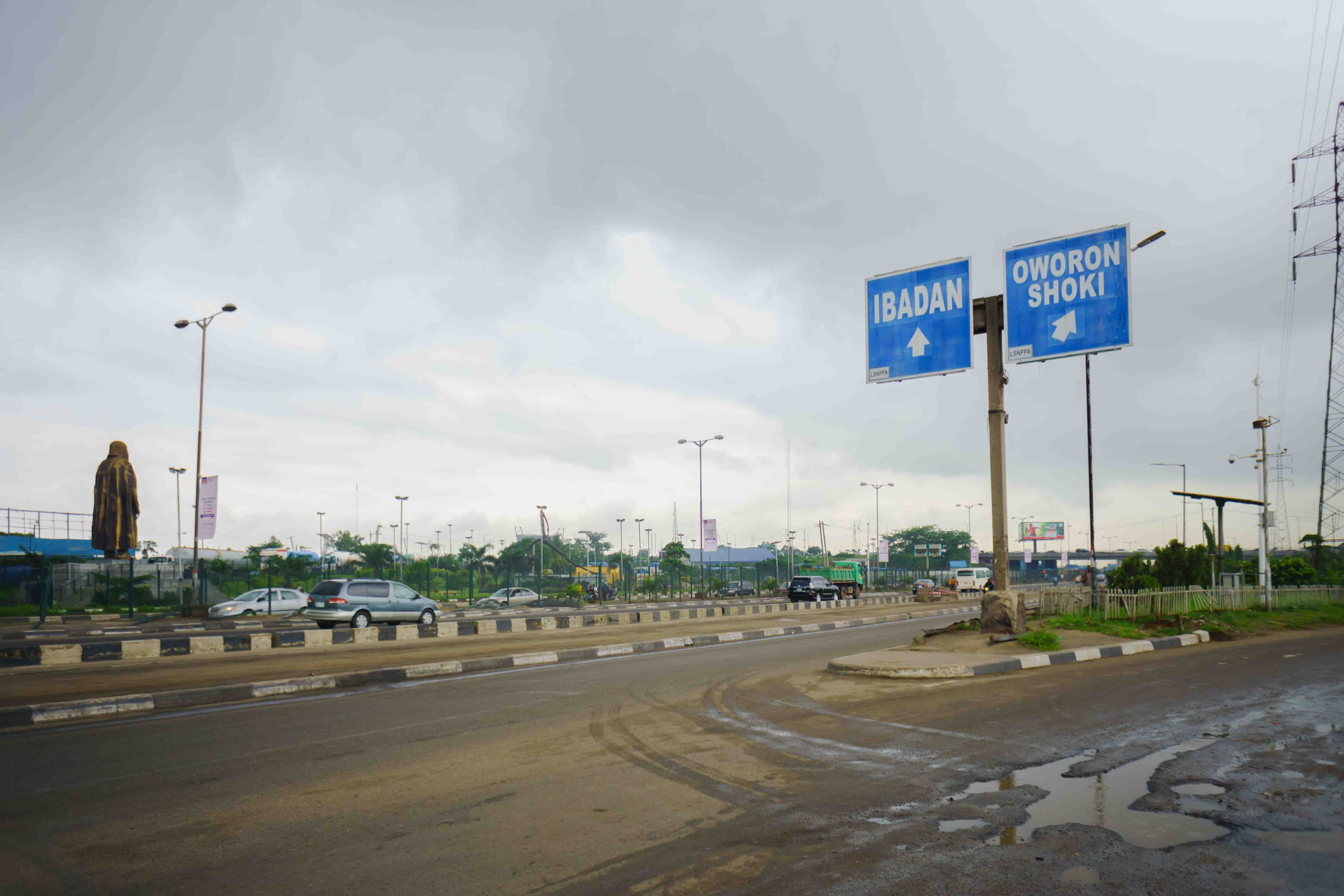

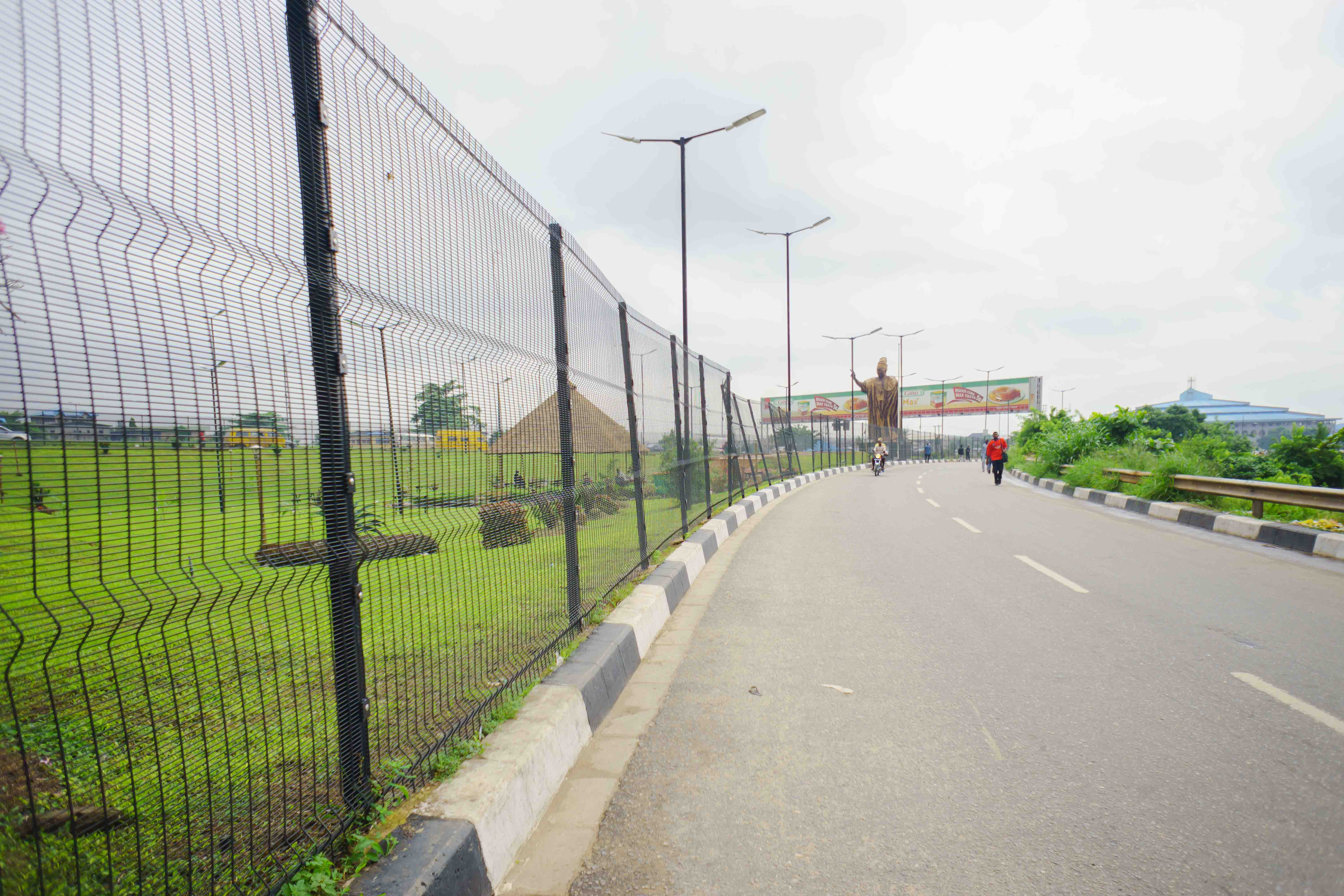

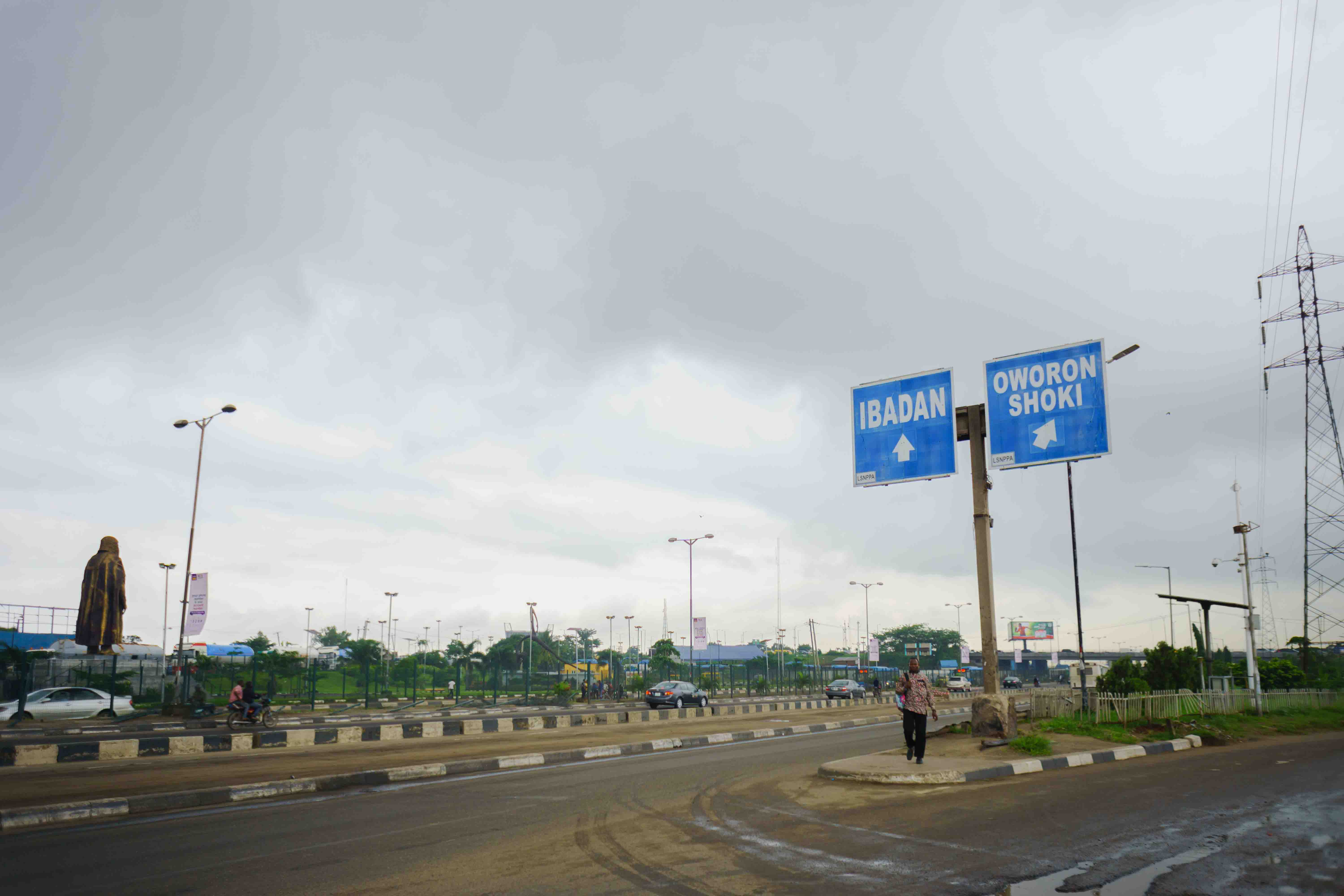
