= Eluku =

Festival in Nigeria by the Yorubas

Eyibi/Eluku festival
- Language: Yoruba

Origin
- Meaning: Local Wrestling
- Region of origin: Yoruba Region, Nigeria

Eyibi/Eluku Festival is an event celebrated by towns and settlements in Ikorodu area of Lagos state and some other parts of Yoruba land. It is an annual traditional festival that is of patriarchal nature, as it is only celebrated by male descendants who are paternal natives to the town. It is also to be noted that it is for males who are specifically natives of Ikorodu.

The Eluku festival is a version of the general Yoruba Oro festival.

During the festival, females and non-natives stay indoors usually for 24 hours, but the economic growth of the town has restricted the time to around 12 hours and also to some selected locations in the township;around the palace and the shrine.

Traditionally the festival is known as Eyibi Festival which is peaked by the outing of the deity called ELUKU. The activities and restrictions that goes with the outing of the Eluku has overshadowed the Eyibi festival; non natives and foreigners have indirectly changed the name of the festival to Eluku Festival.

Eluku is believed to be the executioner of judgement on those found guilty breaking the laws and ignoring customs of the Town.

Eyibi/Eluku festival is 1 of the 4 major festivals in Ikorodu. It is sacred to the Natives.
