= Ijede =

Area in Lagos State, Nigeria

Ijede is a Local Council Development Area (LCDA) in Lagos State, Nigeria. The present chairman of the council is Hon. Motunrayo Gbadebo-Alogba. Ijede is bordered in the east by Imota, in the north by Ikorodu North LCDA, and in the west Ikorodu Central and Igbogbo Bayeku. The council is presently headed by Alhaji Fatiu Salisu as the executive chairman. The Ijede LCDA is headquartered at No 1, Madan Street Ijede overlooking the lagoon serenity for which Lagos is known for.

== History ==
The origins of Ijede can be traced back to the earliest record of its existence as the Ijede Native Authority in 1937, which was attributed a District officer as the executive head of the administration.

In 1952, the Ijede Local Council was gazetted under the defunct western region administration led by Chief Obafemi Awolowo, before it was merged with Ikorodu Local Government under the military government of General Olusegun Obasanjo.

In 1980 during the administration of Governor of Lagos State, Chief Lateef Kayode Jakande, Ijede was carved out of Ikorodu as Ikorodu constituency II into Irepodun Local Government headed by Chief Amusa.

It was during the administration of Gen. Ibrahim Babangida in 1985 that Irepodun Local Government was re-merged to Ikorodu Local Government. Ijede Local Government Area was later recreated in 2003, along with new 37 Local Council Development Areas during the administration of Gov. Ahmed Bola Tinubu, the Former Governor of Lagos State.

== Economy ==
The economy of Ijede is mainly based on the primary sector, particularly agriculture.

The LCDA has the biggest power station in the West African sub-region, the Egbin Power Station.

== Politics ==
Ijede Lcda had been administered by both the elected chairmen, executive secretaries, and sole administrator since its inception 20 years ago.

Ijede Local Council Development Area is one of the 37 LCDAs created from the original 20 local governments in Lagos State by the administration of Senator Bola Ahmed Tinubu (Jagaban Burgu) in 2003. Ijede Lcda was carved out from the old Ikorodu Local Government. The LCDA consists of the following communities: Ijede, Egbin, Oke Eletu, Ginti, Igbodu, Abule Eko, Igbopa, Ilupeju, Igbe Kapo, Igbe Ogunro, Igbe Oloja, Ayetoro, Ipakan, Iponmi, Ewu Owa, etc.

Ijede Lcda has four political wards: Ward A, B, C, and D. Ward A consists of Egbin, Ipakan, and Ebute Olowo. Ward B consists of Aledo, Oju Ayepe, Ayegbami, Etita, Oju Ogun, Itundesan, and Oko Mabude. Ward C consists of Oke Oyinbo, Madan, Pacific, Welcome, Oko Ope, and Igbe. Ward D consists of Abule Eko, Igbopa, Oke Eletu, Gbodu, Igbodo Jabe, and Ilupeju.

== Demographics ==
The people of Ijede are predominant Ijebus and other Yorubas.

=== Occupations ===
The people of Ijede are known to be artisans, farmers, and fishermen.

=== Population ===
The population of Ijede Local Council Area is around 1,600,000 according to the 2006 census.

== Tourism ==
Ijede Local Council Development Area has a lot of tourist attractions:

- Ijede Spring Water
- Lagos Lagoon

TOWNS & VILLAGES: Oke-Eletu, Abule-Eko, Igbopa, Ipakan, and Ayetoro etc.

== Industry ==
Ijede plays host of Commerce and industry, such as Egbin Thermal Station.

The LCDA has good arable land fertile enough to engage in massive mechanized farming as well as agricultural and agro allied businesses.

== Infrastructure ==
=== Education ===
There are 4 public primary schools and 1 secondary school with more than 40 private primary and secondary schools will be found at Ijede as at today.

=== Health care ===
HOSPITALS/HEALTH CENTRES:

- Ijede Primary Health Centre Ijede,
- Primary Health Centre Oke-Eletu
- Primary health Centre Abule-Eko
