= Ikorodu =

- City and LGA
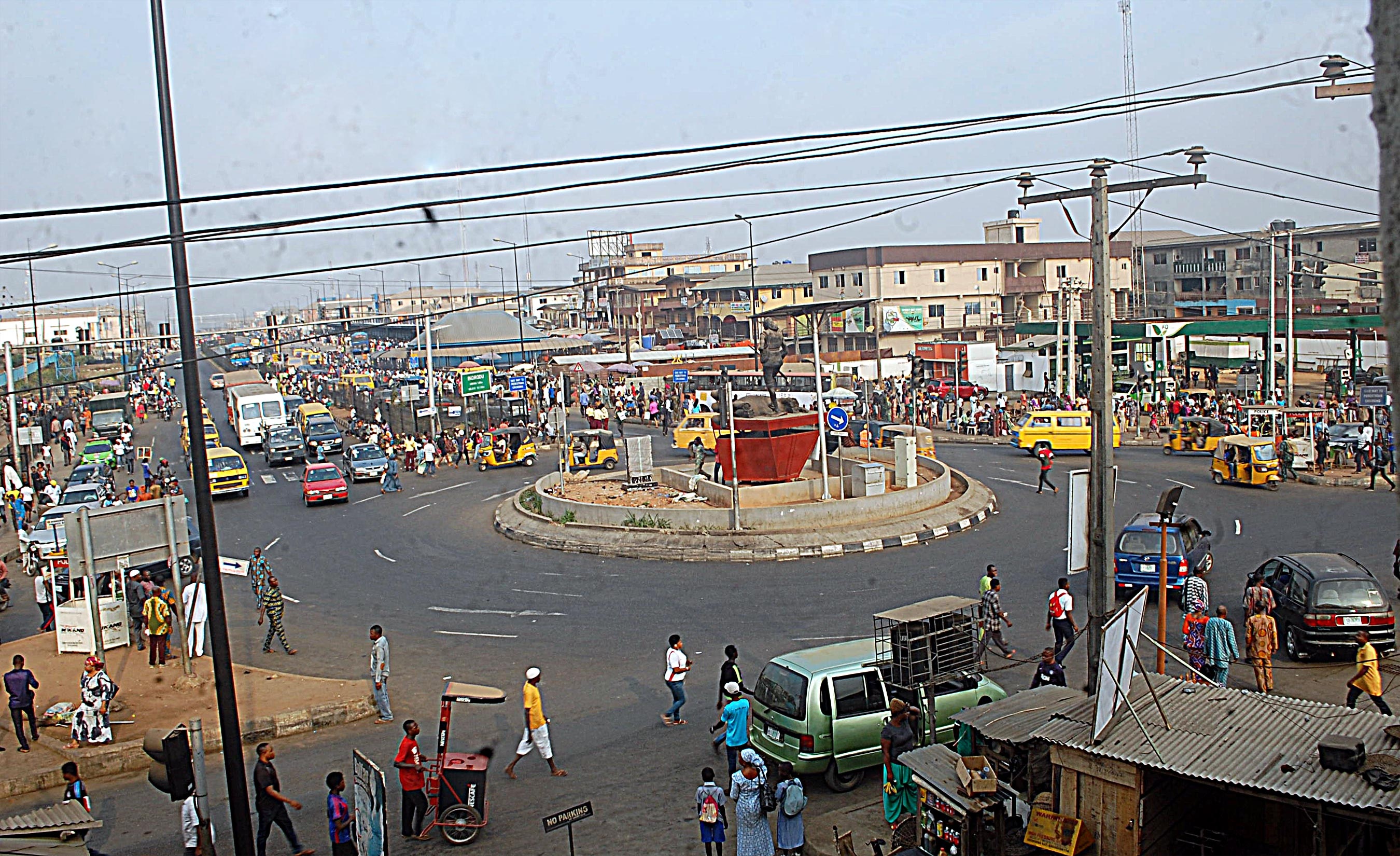
- Downtown Ikorodu
- Interactive map of Ikorodu
- Location within Nigeria
- Coordinates: 6°36′N 3°30′E
- Country: Nigeria
- State: Lagos State

Government
  - LGA Chairman: Adedayo Ladega

Area
  - Land: 345 km^{2} (133 sq mi)

Population (2006)
  - Total: 536,619
  - Density: 1,560/km^{2} (4,030/sq mi)
- Time zone: UTC+1 (WAT)
- Local language: Yorùbá
- Website: https://ikorodulga.lg.gov.ng

Ikorodu is a city and Local government area in Lagos State, Nigeria. It is located to the north-east of Lagos, along the Lagos Lagoon and shares boundary with Ogun State. With a population of over 1 million inhabitants, Ikorodu is currently the 12th largest city in Nigeria and growing at a rate of 5.26% annually, it is projected to reach 1.7 million inhabitants by 2035, It is the 2nd largest local government in Lagos State. Indigenous settlers of Ikorodu emigrated from Sagamu and part of Ijebu in Ogun state.

== Geography ==
Situated approximately 37 km north of Lagos, Ikorodu is bounded to the south by the Lagos Lagoon, to the north by a boundary with Ogun State, and to the east by a boundary with Agbowa-Ikosi, a town in Epe Division of Lagos State. The town has grown significantly in the past 40 years and is divided into sixteen or seventeen "Ituns" or minor areas. The main industries in the town are trading, farming and manufacturing. Ijebu dialect is widely spoken in ikorodu.

Nearby major towns include Imota, Isiu, Liadi, Egbin, Ijede, Ibeshe, Igbogbo and Bayeku, all of which constitute their own Local Council Development Area with their own traditional rulers (Obas). Together these areas make up Ikorodu Division.

Ikorodu Division has a large industrial area containing several factories. The town of Ikorodu itself is home to branches of several established Nigerian banks.

Ikorodu is the fastest growing part-exurb of Lagos metropolis, owing in part to increasing influx of people from Ikorodu's surrounding towns and villages attracted by the town's proximity to Lagos.

In 2003, the existing Ikorodu LGAs was split for administrative purposes into Local Council Development Areas. These lower-tier administrative units now include the following 5 LCDAs and one LG: Imota, Igbogbo/Bayeku, Ijede, Ikorodu North, Ikorodu West, Ikorodu (LGA).

== Climate ==
Ikorodu experiences a climate that is predominately classified as Aw by the Köppen climate classification. There are 93 rainy days per year, culminating to 1,840 mm (72 in) per year.

== Economy ==
=== Imota rice mill ===
The Imota rice mill is an agricultural plant. It was built in 2021 and will commence full production in the second quarter of 2022.

==== Capacity ====
The rice mill has a capacity to produce 2.8 million bags of 50 kg bags of rice yearly, while generating 1,500 direct jobs and 254,000 indirect jobs. On completion, in line with the estimated installed infrastructure of the facility, the production capacity of the rice mill in Imota will set it among the largest in the world, and the largest in sub-Saharan Africa.

==== Economic effect ====
According to Lagos State governor Sanwo-Olu, full production of the facility will drastically reduce prices of rice and pressure to purchase the commodity. At this moment (early 2022) Nigeria produces husk rice, yet imports hulled/polished rice at a higher price. Processing the national staple food rice in its own country therefore should improve Nigeria's trade balance.

==== Technical process ====
In a rice mill, primarily the cereals spelt, barley, oats, millet and rice are hulled, i.e. the husks that are firmly attached to the grain and do not fall off during threshing are removed (dehusking). The husks are indigestible for the human organism and would negatively influence the taste and chewing sensations. Furthermore, in a rice mill, the hulled cereal grains are usually also subsequently rolled (oat flakes), cut (groats) or polished (rice, rolled barley). Other possible processing steps are mostly identical to those in a grain mill.

==== Surroundings ====
The State Government is also developing an industrial park adjacent to the mill. Governor Sanwo-Olu said the park would have amenities that would make businesses thrive and bring returns on investment to business owners.

== Religion ==
Inhabitants of Ikorodu include adherents to several religions, including Christianity, Islam, and traditional worship.

== Education ==
Within greater Ikorodu there are 69 public primary schools and 12 secondary schools. There are also several private nurseries, primary and secondary schools, and three tertiary institutions. These include Caleb University, a private university located in the Imota area of the town, the first private university in Lagos.

== Ikorodu Divisional Library ==
There are several public libraries that are accessible to students, teachers, researchers and anyone who loves to read newspaper or any material of their choice.

- Ikorodu Town hall library located at T.O.S Benson Rd.
- Lasustech library.
- Ijede Reading Room

== Tourist centres ==
- Cradoo Lake Waterfront, Ipakodo and Ibeshe.
- Odoro stream and beach, Ijede
- Iledi Oshugbo Abalaiye Ikorodu: sacred groove for the installation of Ikorodu Kings
- Palace of the Ayangburen of Ikorodu.
- Dream Park Cinemas
- Oba Ayangbure's Palace

== Cultural Heritage Groups ==
- Oro: Magbo / Liwe / Pakor. Ilu Ikorodu
- Obaluaye: Ilu Ikorodu
- Alagemo, Meboyi: Ilu Ikorodu
- Osugbo Abalaye: ilu Ikorodu
- Eleluku Ikorodu: ilu Ikorodu
- Oni-Lire Ikorodu: ilu Ikorodu
- Irele Awo-opa (Akee): ilu Ikorodu
- Odi Oba: ilu Ikorodu
- Turupu Ikorodu central: ilu Ikorodu
- Aijasanmi Osanyin: ilu Ikorodu
- Aranfo: ilu Ikorodu
- Egun Aga: ilu Ikorodu
- Awo Abilefo: ilu Ikorodu
- Asa: ilu Ikorodu
- IGUNNUKO: ilu Ikorodu
- Ogboni Aborigen ilu Ikorodu

== Notable people ==
- Ogunleye Gbolahan Adetokunbo, politician
- Babajimi Adegoke Benson, politician, member of the House of Representatives representing Ikorodu Federal Constituency
- Motunrayo Gbadebo-Alogba, Chairperson Ijede LCDA and the Lagos State youngest council boss
- Asisat Oshoala, footballer for Bay FC and the Nigeria national
