= Ayodeji Olukoju =

Nigerian professor of history and university administrator

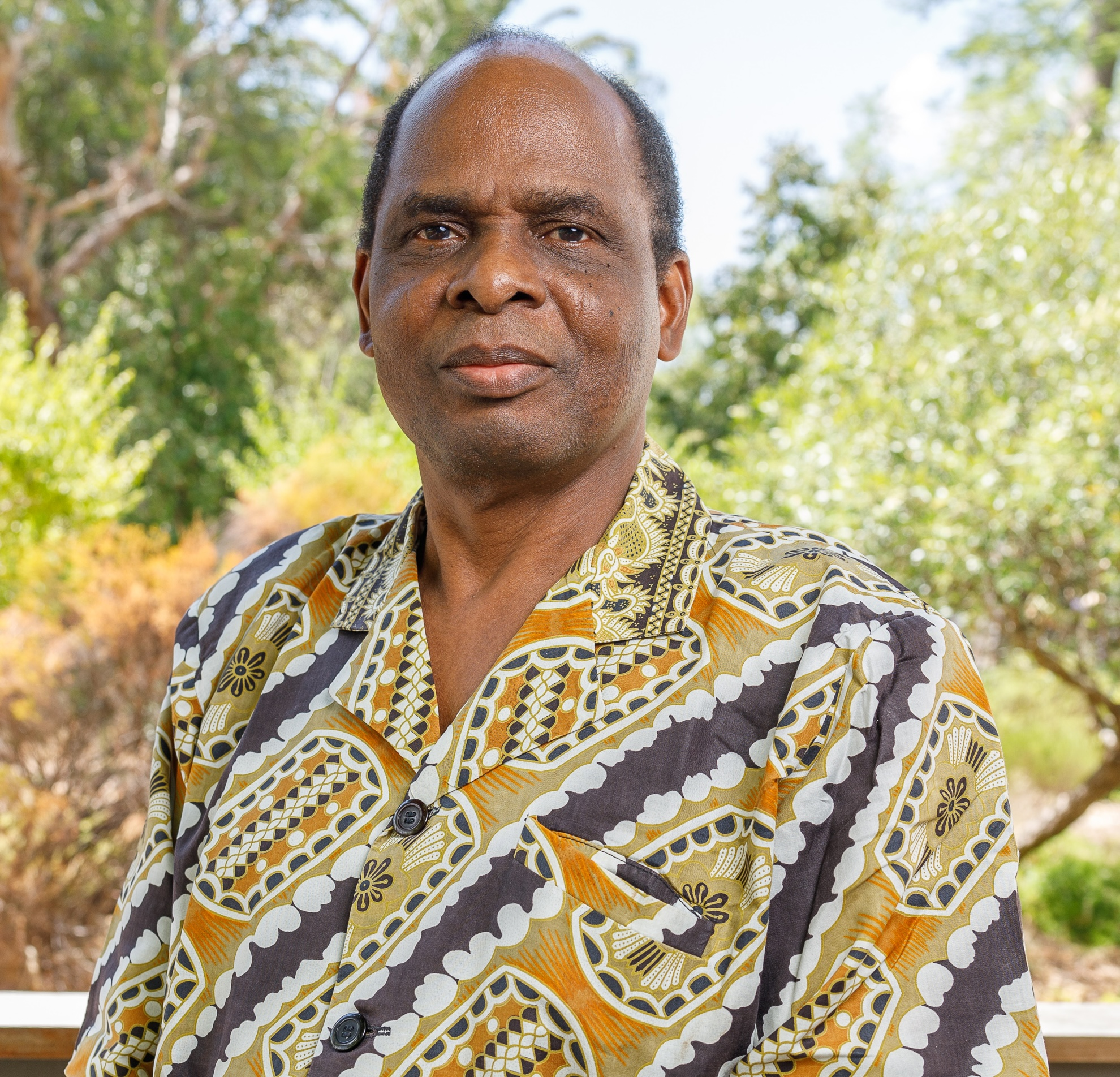
- Born: Ayodeji Oladimeji Olukoju; June 9, 1959 (age 67); Oka Akoko
- Occupation: Professor of History

Academic background
- Education: University of Ibadan, University of Nigeria

Academic work
- Discipline: History
- Sub-discipline: maritime, transport, economic, social and urban history
- Institutions: University of Lagos
- Main interests: maritime, transport, economic, and urban history of Nigeria

Ayodeji Oladimeji Olukoju (Yoruba: Ayọ̀ọ́dèjì Ọládiméjì Olúkòjú; born June 9, 1959, in Oka Akoko) is a Nigerian University distinguished professor of history at the University of Lagos, Nigeria. He was a two-term vice chancellor of Caleb University, Imota between 2010 and 2016. Olukoju's research interests are in the area of maritime, transport, economic, social, corporate and urban history of Nigeria.

== Education and career ==
Olukoju earned a bachelor's degree (with a First Class Honours) from the University of Nigeria, Nsukka in June 1980, and master's and doctorate degrees in history from the University of Ibadan in 1982 and 1991 respectively. From 1984 to 1987, Olukoju lectured at Ogun State University (now Olabisi Onabanjo University). In September 1987, he joined the University of Lagos' department of history and strategic studies. In 1998, Olukoju was appointed a substantive professor of history, and a university distinguished professor twenty years later. He served as the head of the history department from 2001 to 2004, and then as the dean of the faculty of arts from 2005 to 2009. He was a DAAD Guest Professor of Economic History at University of Bayreuth, Germany from May to August 2022.

At different times in his career, Olukoju has held postdoctoral visiting research fellowships of the Stellenbosch Institute of Advanced Studies, Japan Foundation, Institute of Developing Economies, the British Academy, DAAD, Institute of Developing Economies, as well as of the Henry Charles Chapman Foundation and the A. G. Leventis Foundation at the Institute of Commonwealth Studies, London. He also earned a West African Research Association (WARA) residency at Emory University, Atlanta. Olukoju was University of Lagos best researcher in the arts/humanities in 2006 and 2009.

Olukoju is currently a member of the editorial advisory board of Journal of Global History. At various time between 1998 and 2015, he has served on the editorial advisory boards of Journal of African History, African Economic History, Afrika Zamani, and History in Africa. In 2008, he was elected as the first African on the executive committee of the Stellenbosch Institute of Advanced Studies.

Olukoju was inducted Fellow of the Nigerian Academy of Letters in 2011. He is the incumbent pro-chancellor and chairman, governing council of Chrisland University.

== Publications ==
Olukoju is the sole author of five scholarly monographs. They are:

- Olukoju, Ayodeji (2007). The Fourteenth Commissar of Works: The Life and Labour of Rauf Aregbesola. Bluesign. ISBN 978-978-34175-1-9. OCLC 503299318.
- Olukoju, Ayodeji (2006). Culture and Customs of Liberia. Westport, CT: Greenwood Press. ISBN 9780313038457.
- Olukoju, Ayodeji (2004). The "Liverpool" of West Africa : the dynamics and impact of maritime trade in Lagos, 1900-1950. Africa World Press. ISBN 1-59221-291-3. OCLC 694905194.
- Infrastructure Development and Urban Facilities in Lagos, 1861-2000 (Ibadan: IFRA-Nigeria, 2003) and
- Olukoju, Ayodeji (1996). Maritime Trade, Port Development, and Administration: The Japanese experience and Lessons for Nigeria. Institute of Developing Economies. OCLC 43160623.

Olukoju has also edited, singly or jointly with others, six volumes, which include:

- Nigerian Peoples and Cultures (1997)
- Fundamentals of Economic History (2003)
- Northeast Yorubaland: Studies in the History and Culture of a Frontier Zone (2003)
- Global Understanding in the Age of Terrorism (2008)
- Security Challenges and Management in Modern Nigeria (2018) and
- Olukoju, Ayodeji; Castillo Hidalgo, Daniel, eds. (2020). African Seaports and Maritime Economics in Historical Perspective. Palgrave Studies in Maritime Economics. Cham: Springer. doi:10.1007/978-3-030-41399-6. ISBN 978-3-030-41398-9. ISSN 2662-6551. S2CID 229265200.

He has also authored numerous scholarly publications in peer-reviewed academic journals such as African Affairs, African Studies Review, African Economic History, The Journal of Imperial and Commonwealth History, Journal of Global History, Journal of Third World Studies, Journal of Transport History, International Journal of Maritime History, International Review of Social History, The Journal of African History, International Journal of African Historical Studies, Afrika Zamani, among others.

Olukoju also contributes opinion essays about current socio-political issues in Nigeria, especially with regards to education and the university system, in different publishing medium such as The Conversation, among others.

In 2013, in celebration of Olukoju's scholarship, Saheed Aderinto and Paul Osifodunrin published an edited festschrift titled The Third Wave of Historical Scholarship on Nigeria: Essays in Honor of Ayodeji Olukoju.
