= Nigerian Institute of Journalism =

- Formation: 1971
- Founder: International Press Institute(IPI)
- Legal status: Higher Institution of Learning
- Headquarters: 8-14 Ijaiye road, Ogba-Ikeja, Lagos state
- Provost: Mr Gbenga Adefaye
- Parent organization: The Nigerian Guild of Editors, the Nigerian Union of Journalists, Nigerian Institute of Public Relations and Advertising Practitioners Council of Nigeria (APCON).
- Website: www.nij.edu.ng

The Nigerian Institute of Journalism is a Nigerian monotechnic located in Ikeja, Lagos State. The institute is a diploma awarding monotechnic established in 1963 by the International Press Institute and became fully operational in 1971. The institute offers academic and professional diploma programmes, ranging from full time to part time, for the award of National Diploma. The institute has a special programme directorate charged with developing certificate courses in effective writing and communication, photojournalism, film directing. It is one of the monotechnics in Nigeria accredited by the National Board for Technical Education.

== Administration ==
The institute has a governing council chaired by Chief Olusegun Osoba and others members who perform general oversight over the institution and its affairs. The day to day activities of the institution is headed by a provost who serves as the chief academic officer and assisted by a deputy provost as well as the registrar who plays a major role in the review, development, and enforcement of goals and objectives. On September 1, 2020, Mr. Gbenga Adefaye assumed the office of the provost of the institute succeeding Mr. Gbemiga Ogunleye.

== Notable alumni ==
- Abike Dabiri
- Ayandiji Daniel Aina
- Edward Gabkwet
- Funmi Wakama
- John Momoh
- Korede Bello
- Ngozi Ezeonu
- Yeni Kuti

== See also ==
- International Press Institute
- Nigerian Guild of Editors
- Nigerian Union of Journalists
