= Nosa Owens-Ibie =

Nigerian Academic

- Born: Nosa Owens-Ibie; Nigeria
- Office: Vice-Chancellor of Caleb University (2019 - 2025)
- Predecessor: Ayandiji Daniel Aina
- Honors: Fellow, Nigerian Academy of Letters (2026); Foundation Fellow, ACSPN (2026); Fellow, International Institute of Journalism, Berlin (1999); Fellow, Salzburg Seminar (1995)

Academic background
- Education: University of Lagos (BSc, MSc); University of Ibadan (PhD)

Academic work
- Discipline: Communication and Media studies, political communication, journalism
- Notable works: New minority marginalisations and the social media ecosystem in Nigeria (2026); Understanding Political Communication in Nigeria Strategies and Ideologies (2026); Communicating an Implosion: Signs and Wander, Popular Culture and the Crumbling of Empire (2013); How Video Films Developed in Nigeria (1998)

Nosa Owens-Ibie is a Nigerian academic, communication scholar, and Professor of Communication, Media and Development. He served as the two-term Vice-Chancellor of Caleb University, Imota, Lagos State, Nigeria, leading the institution in an acting capacity from 2018 and as substantive Vice-Chancellor from 2019 until 2025.

Owens-Ibie coordinated the establishment of the Association of Communication Scholars & Professionals of Nigeria (ACSPN) and served as its pioneer General Secretary from 2013 to 2024, later becoming Co-Chairman of the Board of Trustees. His career encompasses university leadership, higher education curriculum development in Nigeria, journalism, public relations, international health and development communication consultancy with the United Nations system, non-governmental organisations, and local entities, and research in political communication, media, and development.

== Early life and education ==
Owens-Ibie attended the University of Lagos, graduating with a Bachelor of Science (B.Sc. Hons) in Mass Communication in 1980, majoring in Print Journalism. He completed his National Youth Service Corps (NYSC) service year as a Teaching Support Assistant in the Department of Mass Communication at the University of Lagos from 1980 to 1981.

He continued his postgraduate studies at the University of Lagos as a Federal Government of Nigeria postgraduate scholar, graduating as the best student in his class with a Master of Science (M.Sc.) in Mass Communication awarded in January 1983, specializing in Broadcasting. Between 1990 and 1992, he enrolled for MPhil/PhD studies in Communication Arts at the University of Ibadan, graduating in 1992 with a Doctor of Philosophy (PhD) focusing on comparative media studies.

== Academic and administrative career ==
=== Early academic appointments ===
Owens-Ibie pioneered and served as Public Relations Officer at NISER, Ibadan, before joining the Department of Mass Communication, University of Lagos, serving as Lecturer I and Senior Lecturer from 1995 to 2000. He was also an adjunct faculty member at the Enugu State University of Science and Technology (ESUT) Business School in Lagos from 1999 to 2000.

=== Caleb University leadership ===
On 17 October 2011, Owens-Ibie joined Caleb University and became the first full Professor appointed by the institution. On 9 April 2013, he delivered the university's maiden inaugural lecture, titled Communicating an Implosion: Signs and Wander, Popular Culture and the Crumbling of Empire.

During his tenure at Caleb University, he held several academic, administrative, and pastoral leadership roles:

- Head of the Department of Mass Communication (2011–2013)
- Dean of Student Affairs (2011–2013)
- Dean of the College of Social and Management Sciences (2013–2017)
- Dean of the College of Postgraduate Studies (2017–2018)
- University Chaplain and Chairman of the Chapel Committee (2012–2021)
- First substantive Deputy Vice-Chancellor (May 2018 – December 2018)
- Acting Vice-Chancellor (17 December 2018 – 31 October 2019)
- Substantive Vice-Chancellor (2019–2025)

Between 2015 and 2018, he also served as Editor-in-Chief of the Caleb Journal of Social and Management Sciences (CJSMS). During his vice-chancellorship, he participated in institutional governance summits, including the Committee of Vice-Chancellors of Nigerian Universities (CVCNU) workshop in Cambridge, United Kingdom, and spoke on national education innovations.

=== Supervision, examination, and institutional service ===
Over his academic career, Owens-Ibie has supervised 107 undergraduate research projects, 14 postgraduate diploma (PGD) projects, 16 master's theses, and three completed doctoral dissertations following the commencement of doctoral graduations at Caleb University in the 2023/2024 academic session. He has served as chairman and member on National Universities Commission (NUC) resource verification and accreditation panels across Nigeria. He has also functioned as an external examiner for undergraduate and postgraduate programmes and assessed candidates for professorial appointments across federal, state, and private universities in Nigeria.

== Curriculum reform, ACSPN, and UNESCO collaborations ==
Owens-Ibie played a central role in founding the Association of Communication Scholars & Professionals of Nigeria (ACSPN), having served as Chairman of the Steering Committee and General Secretary of its predecessor body, the Communication Association of Nigeria (CANI), from 2012 to 2013. He served as the pioneer General Secretary of ACSPN from 30 December 2013 until 5 September 2024, and was subsequently appointed Co-Chairman of the ACSPN Board of Trustees in November 2025. Through ACSPN and its partnerships, he coordinated national and regional initiatives:

- Unbundling of Mass Communication: In November 2015, he coordinated the ACSPN UNESCO University of Lagos workshop of stakeholders that developed the foundational framework and first draft for unbundling mass communication into distinct specialized disciplines (eventually yielding programmes such as Journalism, Development Communication, Public Relations, Advertising, Film and Multimedia, and Broadcasting and Strategic Communication) in Nigerian universities, while retaining mass communication as a programme. This framework was finalized as the Core Curriculum Minimum Academic Standards (CCMAS) by the National Universities Commission (NUC) and launched in 2022.
- Media and Information Literacy (MIL): He co-coordinated the development of UNESCO Media and Information Literacy Non-Curricular Activities Materials for Nigeria and Sierra Leone, including an MIL board game and card game, storybooks, and animation manuals adopted by UNESCO Paris in 2020 as global resources on the UNESDOC Digital Library.
- Analysis of 2015 Election Campaign Messages: He was a member of the research team for the project Understanding Nigerian Media and Elections through Research: Analysis of the 2015 Presidential Election Campaign Messages project, coordinated.by Association of Communication Scholars & Professionals of Nigeria (ACSPN) in collaboration with North Dakota State University (NDSU), ORBICOM/UNESCO, and other partners, including the Advertising Practitioners Council of Nigeria (APCON). January 2017 – April 2018. The project was supported by a grant from Ford Foundation.

== Professional practice and development communication ==
Alongside his university appointments, Owens-Ibie maintained an extensive professional practice in development communication, public health mobilization, and journalism:

- UN System and Health Interventions: Between 2000 and 2009, he worked with the World Health Organization (WHO) Nigeria Country Office as National Social Mobilization Officer for the Expanded Programme on Immunization (EPI) and Polio Eradication Initiative (PEI), documenting nationwide immunization best practices and co-editing Countdown. He also served in other consultancy positions within the organisation's EPI/PEI programme in Nigeria, and has consulted for UNICEF, the United Nations Population Fund (UNFPA), USAID, and the International Organization for Migration (IOM). His assignments included serving as consultant on the National Review of Studies on Barriers to Utilization of Family Planning in Nigeria (UNFPA/FMOH, 2012–2013), the Review of the Nigerian First Lady's Maternal Health Advocacy Programme (UNFPA, 2010), and the Pre-Information Campaign Assessment of Irregular Migration in Nigeria (IOM/Federal Ministry of Labour and Productivity, 2010).
- Civil Society Toolkits: He was the lead consultant for the development of Reporting Elections and Democratic Accountability: A Resource Manual (International Press Centre/EU, 2018), the Integrated HIV/AIDS, Tuberculosis and Malaria (ATM) Response Resource Kit for Civil Society Organizations in Nigeria (ActionAid Nigeria, 2010), the accompanying trainers manual, and An Illustrative Resource Kit for Women: Promoting Women's Empowerment through Peer Education (ActionAid Nigeria, 2010).
- Print Journalism and Broadcasting: He served as an ombudsman columnist for The Guardian on Sunday (1988–1993) and Sunday Punch (1993–1998). In broadcasting, he scripted news commentaries and analyses, radio plays for Radio Nigeria 1 and 2 (including Man of Fortune and By the Grace of My Boss), television drama for the Nigerian Television Authority (NTA 10), anti-apartheid features and creative pieces for the Voice of Nigeria (VON), and human-interest pieces for newspapers and magazines.
- Media Adjudication and Industry Keynotes: He has served as a panelist for the Diamond Awards for Media Excellence (DAME) since 1996. He has also served as a speaker at regulatory and academic colloquiums, including the Advertising Regulatory Council of Nigeria (ARCON) Industry Colloquium in 2023.

== Public writing ==
Since 17 June 2004, Owens-Ibie has authored Son-Shine, a weekly email series of inspirational, ethical, and devotional reflections that is also disseminated through dedicated web and social media channels.

== Personal life ==
A Christian minister and marriage counsellor, Owens-Ibie served as a parish and acting area pastor in The Redeemed Christian Church of God (RCCG) between 1999 and 2011. During his tenure at Caleb University, he served as the university chaplain and chairman of the Chapel Committee from 2012 to 2021, and led the Caleb University Staff Fellowship Coordination Team from 2014 to 2025.

== Honours, distinctions and professional association memberships ==
- Fellow, Nigerian Academy of Letters (NAL) (2026)
- Foundation Fellow, Association of Communication Scholars & Professionals of Nigeria (ACSPN) (2026)
- ACSPN Award for Outstanding Contributions to the Development of Communication and Media Scholarship and Profession in Nigeria (September 2026)
- Fellow, International Institute for Journalism (IIJ), Berlin, Germany (1999)
- Fellow, Salzburg Seminar, Austria (1995)
- Member, Nigerian Institute of Public Relations (NIPR)
- Associate Registered Practitioner in Advertising (arpa), Advertising Regulatory Council of Nigeria (ARCON)
- Federal Government of Nigeria Postgraduate Scholarship recipient (1982)

== Selected publications ==
=== Books ===
- Agbaje, A., Owens-Ibie, N., Ogwezzy, A. O., Oyeleye, S. A., Aondover, E. M., & Ademosu, I. (2026). Understanding Political Communication in Nigeria Strategies and Ideologies. London: Palgrave Macmillan. doi:10.1007/978-3-031-95087-2.
- Owens-Ibie, N., & Aondover, E. M. (2025). Issues in Contemporary Journalism Education and Practice in Nigeria (Vol. 1). Wilmington, USA: Vernon Press. doi:10.54094/b-43a41b5e0e.
- Owens-Ibie, N., Oji, M., & Ogwezi, J. (Eds.). (2019). Fake News and Hate Speech: Narratives of Political Instability. Concord, Ontario: Canada University Press.
- Oso, L., Olatunji, R., & Owens-Ibie, N. (Eds.). (2014). Journalism and Media in Nigeria: Context, Issues and Practice. Concord, Ontario: Canada University Press.

=== Selected journal articles, book chapters and monographs ===
- Owens-Ibie, N., Nnabuihe, E. O., & Aondover, E. M. (2026). "New minority marginalisations and the social media ecosystem in Nigeria". African Identities. doi:10.1080/14725843.2026.2672423.
- Owens-Ibie, N., & Aondover, E. M. (2024). "Hate Postings on Social Media and Peace Imperatives in Nigeria". In B. Di Fatima (Ed.), Legal Challenges and Political Strategies in the Post-Truth Era, Online Hate Speech Trilogy Vol II (pp. 121 138). Labcom Comunicação & Artes.
- Owens-Ibie, N. (2016). "Conflicting Communication in the Communication of Conflict: Chibok and Narratives on Media Representation". In O. Esan (Ed.), Taking Stock: Nigerian Media and National Challenges (ACSPN Book Series 1, pp. 69 88). Concord, Ontario: Canada University Press.
- Owens-Ibie, N. (2014). Catalytic or Cataclysmic? New Media and Democratic Space Disorders in the Nigerian Project. 4th Faculty of Arts Public Lecture, Adekunle Ajasin University.
- Owens-Ibie, N. (2013). Communicating an Implosion: Signs and Wander, Popular Culture and the Crumbling of Empire. Maiden Inaugural Lecture, Caleb University.
- Owens-Ibie, N. (2009). "Poverty, Professionalism and the Challenges of Democratization among Conflicted Print Media Journalists in Nigeria". In R. M'Bayo, C. Onwumechili, & B. Musa (Eds.), Communication in an Era of Global Conflicts: Principles and Strategies for 21st Century Africa (pp. 329 348). University Press of America.
- Owens-Ibie, N. (2004). "Communication and Development in Nigeria: A Discussion". African Journal of Political Science, 9(1), 71 83.
- Owens-Ibie, N. (2002). "Socio-Cultural Considerations in Conflict Reporting in Nigeria". In U. A. Pate (Ed.), Introduction to Conflict Reporting in Nigeria (pp. 30 44). Friedrich Ebert Stiftung.
- Owens-Ibie, N. (2000). "Programmed for Domination: U.S Television Broadcasting and its effects on Nigerian Culture". In R. Wagnleitner & E. T. May (Eds.), Here, There and Everywhere: The Foreign Politics of American Popular Culture (pp. 132 146). University Press of New England.
- Owens-Ibie, N. (1998). "How Video Films Developed in Nigeria". Media Development, 1/1998, 39 42.
