= Patricia Kalesanwo =

Nigerian journalist

- Education: University of Ibadan
- Occupations: Communication expert and journalist

Patricia Kalesanwo is a Nigerian communication expert, journalist, and the first female registrar of the Nigerian Institute of Journalism. She attended the University of Nigeria, Nsukka and holds a master's degree in adult education (Communication Arts) from the University of Ibadan, Ibadan, Southwest, Nigeria. Patricia worked at the Federal Radio Corporation of Nigeria (FRCN) and was the Students' Affairs Officer of the institute before she was appointed the acting registrar of the institution on 28 February 2020 and later confirmed as the substantive registrar of the institute on 17 March 2021.
