= Moji (name) =

Nigerian Yoruba name

- Gender: Female
- Language: Yoruba

Origin
- Meaning: I wake
- Region of origin: South-West Nigeria

Other names
- Variant forms: Mojimorire; Mojirayo; Mojisola; Mojirade

Mojí is a Nigerian female name of Yoruba origin which means "I wake". Moji is most commonly a diminutive form of "Mojisola" which means I wake up to wealth. Other full forms of the name include Mojimorire (I wake up to see goodness, Mojirola (I wake up to see wealth, Mojirayo (I wake up to joy).

== Notable people bearing the name ==
Moji Afolayan, Nigerian actress

Moji Akinfenwa, Nigerian politician

Moji Olaiya, Nigerian actress

Moji Makanjuola, Nigerian journalist

Mojisola Adeyeye, Nigerian pharmacist
