= Jeep Trails to Colorado Ghost Towns =

1963 book by Robert L. Brown

- First edition
- Author: Robert L. Brown
- Language: English
- Genre: Travel Guide
- Publisher: Caxton Press
- Publication date: 1963
- ISBN: 0-87004-021-9

Jeep Trails to Colorado Ghost Towns (ISBN 0-87004-021-9) is a 1963 non-fiction travel guide by Robert L. Brown and published by Caxton Press. The book is a descriptive guide to ghost towns and mining camps throughout the Rocky Mountains of Colorado in the United States. It has long been a popular title on the subject among locals, and is available in many bookstores throughout the state. The book devotes chapters to over fifty former mining sites, most of them true ghost towns but also including towns such as Montezuma and Gold Hill that have survived to the present day with a diminished population. The book focuses more on the history and description of each town, rather than the particular route necessary to reach the town. Despite the title, only some of the towns require a four-wheel drive vehicle in order to reach them. Many of the towns listed are accessible in conventional automobiles.
