= Mosun Belo-Olusoga =

Nigerian financial expert (born 1957)

- Born: September 13, 1957 (age 69)
- Education: University of Ibadan
- Occupation: Business Executive
- Known for: Chairman of Access Bank

Mosun Belo-Olusoga (born 13 September 1957) is a Nigerian financial services industry practitioner, a credit and risk management specialist, and school owner. She served as the chairperson of Access Bank PLC and sits as a non-executive director on the board of Premium Pensions Limited, Action Aid, and current Chairman of MTN Foundation.

== Education ==
Mosun studied Economics at the University of Ibadan, graduating with a bachelor's degree in 1979. In 1983, she qualified as a chartered accountant, finishing as the best-performing candidate in her cohort. She received the Society of Women Accountants of Nigeria (SWAN) award for her achievement.

== Career ==
She has worked at KRC Limited as the principal consultant. She is a director of Action Aid, FCSL Asset Management Limited, and Premium Pension Limited.

She is the founder of City of Knowledge Academy, Ijebu-Ode.
