= Babajimi Adegoke Benson =

Nigerian politician

Honourable Babajimi Adegoke Benson
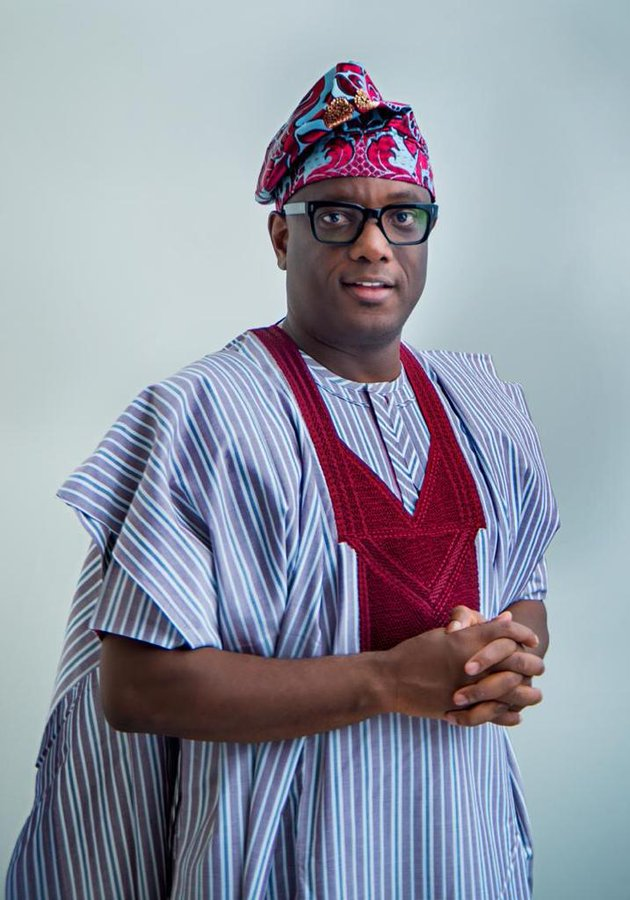

Member of the House of Representatives of Nigeria for Ikorodu constituency
- Incumbent
- Assumed office June 2023

Personal details
- Born: March 30, 1972 (age 54) Ikorodu, Lagos State
- Party: All Progressives Congress (APC)
- Occupation: Politician
- Website: jimibenson.com

Babajimi Adegoke Benson is a Nigerian politician and member of the House of Representatives of Nigeria representing the Ikorodu Federal Constituency in Lagos State. Benson was first elected into the Nigerian House of Representatives in 2015 to represent the Ikorodu Federal Constituency in Lagos State. He was re-elected for a second term in 2019 and has since been re-elected for a third term during the 2023 Nigerian general election in Nigeria.

== Early life, education and career ==
Babajimi Adegoke Benson was born on 30 March 1972 in Ikorodu, Lagos State. He attended Lagos State University where he obtained an LLB in 1994. He proceeded to the Nigerian Law School and obtained a Bachelor of Law (Honors) in 1995. In 1999, he also earned an LLM in Comparative International Business Law from London Guildhall University.

He subsequently pursued an MBA at Warwick Business School in the UK and is a member of both the Nigerian Bar Association and the International Bar Association.

His career started in 1989 after completing his National Youth Service Corps (NYSC) program. He was appointed as a Legal Officer in the General Counsel Division at the United Nations Headquarters in New York. He had also served as an in-house Legal Counsel at Ecobank PLC from 2001 to 2003 and later as Deputy Manager (Legal) at Lead Bank PLC from 2003 to 2004.

In 2007, he became a Non-Executive Director at the Lekki Free Trade Zone, a position he held until his appointment as the company secretary (Strategy, Legal & Corporate Governance) of Lagos State Development and Property Corporation.

== Political career ==
Babajimi began his electoral political career in 2015 on the platform of the All Progressives Congress (APC). He has served on various committees, including Chairman of the House Committee on Banking and Finance, Chairman of the Sub-Committee on Habitat, Deputy Chairman of the Committee on Delegated Legislation, and member of Committees on Works, Justice, Housing, Environment, Treaties, and Protocol in the Nigerian House of Representatives. Currently, he serves as the Chairman of the House Committee on Defense and has introduced several bills and motions aimed at enhancing the efficiency and effectiveness of security agents in the fight against insecurity. He sponsored the Nigerian Armed Forces Support Fund bill, designed to improve the country's defence capabilities.

Babajimi voted and advocated for women's inclusion in political and other leadership positions. As a member of the House of Representatives Constitutional Review Committee during the 8th Assembly in 2016, he voted for and supported the gender bills during the constitutional amendments. He has sponsored several bills, including the Good Samaritan Bill, the Constitution of the Federal Republic of Nigeria, 1999 (Alteration) Bill, the Electric Power Sector Reform Act (Amendment) Bill, and the National Icons, Symbols Legacy Agency Bill, among others. Additionally, he initiated the motion to commemorate World Teachers Day and celebrate Nigerian teachers, and submitted a petition before the House against the Accountant General of the Federation for his refusal to pay salaries and pension arrears of officers who retired from the Federal Civil Service between 2012 and 2020.

== Constituency development ==
Babajimi Adegoke Benson has implemented several projects in his constituency. Among these projects is the iCare Food Bank initiative, launched to provide relief to the elderly, widows, and other vulnerable groups during times of economic hardship. Additionally, he set up IKD 106.1FM, a community radio in his Ikorodu constituency. and also contributed to improving access to healthcare in his constituency by donating an 80-bed Mother and Child Hospital in Imota. These initiatives have impacted the lives of his constituents and have contributed to the development of the community.
