= Ogunleye =

Ogunleye is a surname. Notable people with this surname include:

- Adewale Ogunleye (born 1977), American football player
- Gbemiga Ogunleye, Nigerian lawyer and journalist
- Simisola Ogunleye, birth name of Simi (singer), Nigerian singer-songwriter
- Yemisi Ogunleye (born 1998), German shot putter
- Ogunleye Gbolahan Adetokunbo, Nigerian politician
