= Gbenga Adefaye =

Nigerian journalist

Editor-in-Chief/general manager, Vangaurd Media (Newspapers) Gbenga Adefaye
- Born: 21 September 1961 (age 65); Ile-Ife
- Citizenship: Nigeria
- Occupation: Journalist
- Employer: Vanguard Media (Newspaper)
- Organization: Ife Development Union

Gbenga Adefaye is a Nigerian journalist, administrator and media scholar, with over 30 years' experience in the Nigerian media industry. He is the Editor-in-chief of the Vanguard media (Newspapers) and the provost of the Nigerian Institute of Journalism. More so, he was a two-term president of the Nigerian Guild of Editors (2008–2013) and a member of the Governing council of the University of Lagos, Lagos State, Nigeria.

== Education ==
He obtained a bachelor's degree in Mass communication from the University of Nigeria, Nsukka,1984 and a Master's degree in Mass Communication from the University of Lagos, Lagos in1988

== Career ==
Gbenga began his career as a reporter with the Nigerian Television Authority in 1985. He joined the Vanguard Media in 1986 and has risen from being a Reporter/Feature Writer to Editorial Training Manager/Chief Sub-editor and presently the Editor-in-chief and general manager of the Vanguard Media(Newspaper). In addition, Mr. Gbenga Adefaye was appointed to serve as the Provost of the Nigerian Institute of Journalism, with effect from September 1, 2020, by the Governing council of the institute

== Associations ==
Gbenga is the Deputy President, Ife Development Board (IDB) and chairman of the Ile-Ife community.

== Achievements ==
- He established the Radio Studio project- PEN RADIO and secured the broadcast license from the Nigerian Broadcasting Commission for the Nigerian Institute of Journalism.
- He established the partnership between the Nigerian Guild of Editors and the Pan-Atlantic University, School of Media & Communications and, also started the groundwork for the Editors House in Lagos State.
- Gbenga rallied notable Nigerian statesmen that insulated the nomination and installation of Ooni Ogunwusi Ojaja II in Osun State.

== See also ==
- Nigerian Institute of Journalism
- Nigerian Guild of Editors
- Nigerian Union of Journalists
