= Wakama =

Wakama is a surname. Notable people with the surname include:

- Funmi Wakama (born 1966), Nigerian journalist
- Rena Wakama (born 1992), Nigerian basketball coach and player
