= Diamond FM =

Diamond FM may refer to:

- Diamond FM (Nigeria) (101.1 FM), a radio station in Ibadan, Nigeria
- Diamond FM (Zimbabwe) (103.8 FM), a radio station in Mutare, Zimbabwe
