= Jacinta A. Opara =

Nigerian academic and administrator

Jacinta Agbarachi Opara
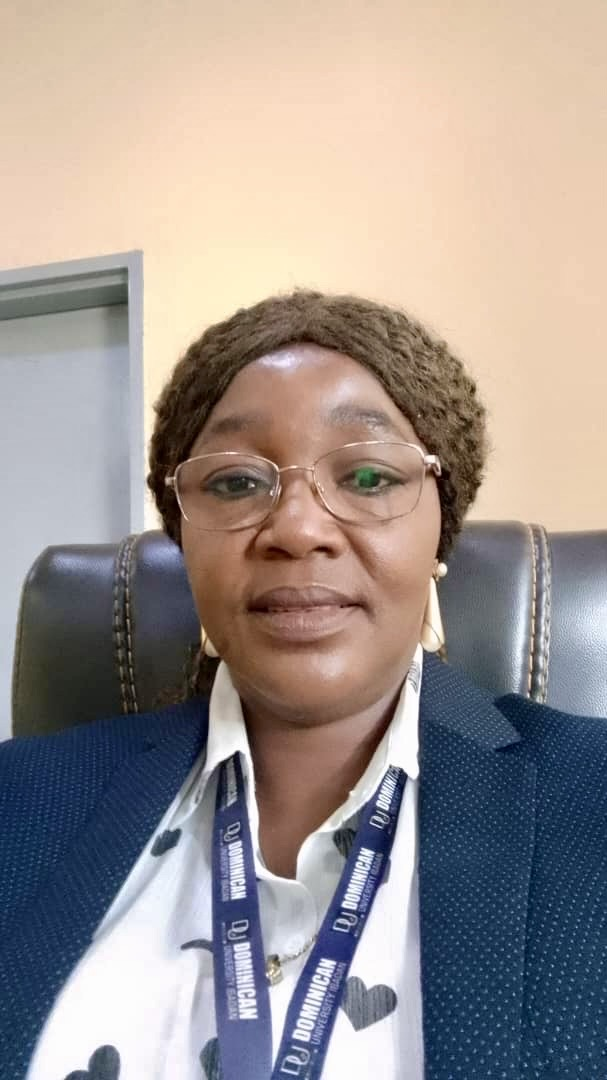

Vice Chancellor of Dominican University Ibadan
- Preceded by: Prof. Anthony Akinwale

Personal details
- Born: Jacinta Agbarachi Opara; 2 February 1976 (age 50) Port Harcourt, Rivers State
- Party: Non-partisan

Jacinta Agbarachi Opara (born 2 February 1976) is a Nigerian Professor and the first female Vice Chancellor of the Dominican University Ibadan.

== Early life and background ==
She holds a bachelors from the University of Nigeria (1996) and a Master's degree from the Rivers State University of Science and Technology (1998). She went on to obtain an MSc in Science Education from the University of Port Harcourt. She also obtained postgraduate degrees from the Universidad Azteca, Chalco-Mexico, University of Granada, Central University of Nicaragua, Oslo Metropolitan University formerly known as Akershus University, and Universidad Catolica San Antonio de Murcia (UCAM).

== Career ==
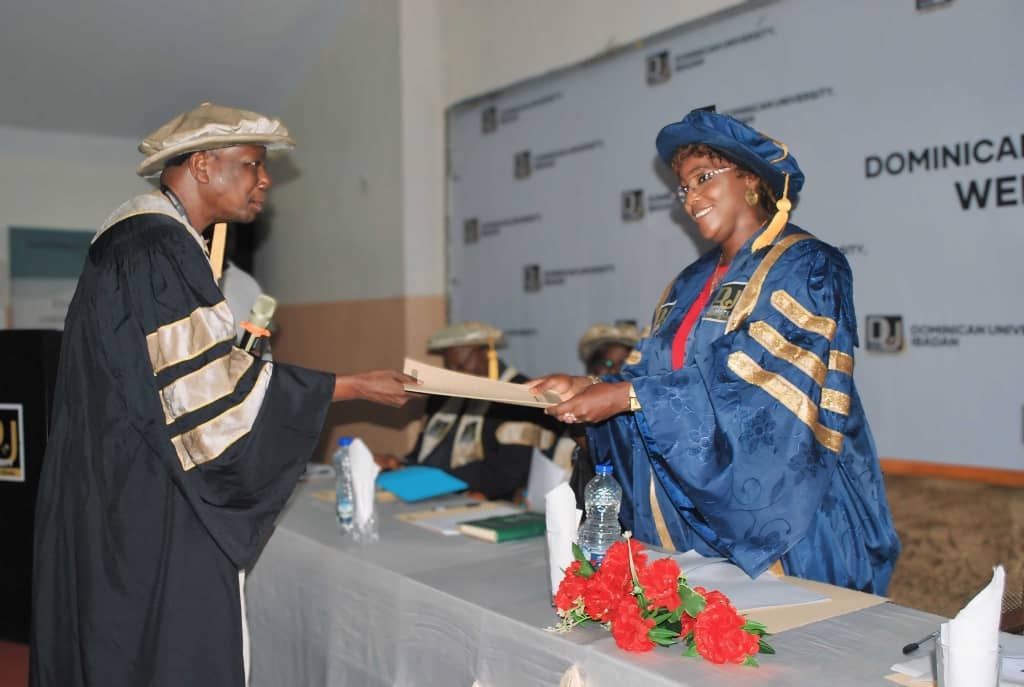
Professor Jacinta Opara receiving her handover notes from Rev Fr Professor Oyeshola Dokun during her swearing in ceremony as the second Vice Chancellor of Dominican University Ibadan

Jacinta started as a biology teacher during her National Youth Service at College of the Immaculate Conception, Enugu in 1997. She has also served in other teaching and administrative roles as Deputy Vice Chancellor, Dean, Director and Head of Department in the University system and beyond.

She currently serves as the Chairman, Governing Council of the Institute of Policy Management Development. She is a member of the Governing Council and Board of several institutions including Metropolitan International University, Uganda.

She was promoted to full professor at Kampala International University, Uganda in 2016. She has published in local and international journals. She is a member of the Organization for Women in Science for the Developing World (OSWD).

On March 7, 2024, she was appointed as the second substantive and first female Vice Chancellor of the Dominican University Ibadan by the University's Governing Council through its Chairman, Board of Trustees, Chief Anthony Idigbe (SAN).

== Personal life ==
She is married with five children (three sons and two daughters).
