= University of Wisconsin Press =

American academic publisher

- Parent company: University of Wisconsin–Madison
- Founded: 1936
- Country of origin: United States
- Headquarters location: Madison, Wisconsin
- Distribution: Chicago Distribution Center (US); Eurospan Group (EMEA); East-West Export Books (Asia and the Pacific)
- Publication types: Books, academic journals
- Imprints: Terrace Books
- No. of employees: 25
- Official website: uwpress.wisc.edu

The University of Wisconsin Press (sometimes abbreviated as UW Press) is a non-profit university press publishing peer-reviewed books and journals. It publishes work by scholars from the global academic community; works of fiction, memoir and poetry under its imprint, Terrace Books; and serves the citizens of Wisconsin by publishing important books about Wisconsin, the Upper Midwest, and the Great Lakes region.

UW Press annually awards the Brittingham Prize in Poetry, the Felix Pollak Prize in Poetry, and The Four Lakes Prize in Poetry.

The press was founded in 1936 in Madison and is one of more than 120 member presses in the Association of University Presses. The Journals Division was established in 1965. The press employs approximately 25 full and part-time staff, produces 40 to 60 new books a year, and publishes 13 journals. It also distributes books and some annual journals for selected smaller publishers. The press is a unit of the Graduate School of the University of Wisconsin–Madison and serves the university's overall mission of research, instruction, and outreach beyond the university.

== Books division ==
Since its first book appeared in 1937, the press has published and distributed more than 3,000 titles. The press has more than 1,400 titles currently in print, including:

- scholarly books: American studies and modern American history, African studies, anthropology, Classical studies, dance history, environmental studies, film/cinema history, gay & lesbian studies, modern European and Irish history, Jewish studies, Slavic and Eastern European studies, Southeast Asian Studies, and other subjects
- regional books: Wisconsin, the Upper Midwest, and the Great Lakes region
- books of general interest: natural history, poetry, biography, fiction, food, travel.

In 2003, the press acquired the publishing company Popular Press, which specialized in works on popular culture.

=== Notable authors and awards ===
Notable authors published by the University of Wisconsin Press include Rigoberto González, Edmund White, Lucy Jane Bledsoe, Olena Kalytiak Davis, Alden Jones, Lesléa Newman, Trebor Healey, Floyd Skloot, Kelly Cherry, Jorie Graham, and Michael Carroll. The press has also published new editions and translations of work by Isaac Bashevis Singer, Leo Tolstoy, and Djuna Barnes.

Books and authors published by the press have won The American Book Award from the Before Columbus Foundation, the Lambda Literary Award, the Sue Kaufman Prize for First Fiction, Independent Publisher Book Awards, NEA Literature Fellowships, the Guggenheim Fellowship, Publishing Triangle Awards, and other honors.

== Journals division ==
- African Economic History
- Arctic Anthropology
- Contemporary Literature
- Ecological Restoration
- Ghana Studies
- History of Pharmacy and Pharmaceuticals
- Journal of Human Resources
- Land Economics
- Landscape Journal
- Luso-Brazilian Review
- Monatshefte
- Native Plants Journal
- Scandinavian Studies

== Controversies ==
University of Wisconsin Press joined The Association of American Publishers trade organization in the Hachette v. Internet Archive lawsuit that found that the Internet Archive committed copyright infringement, which resulted in the removal of access to over 500,000 books from global readers.

== See also ==
- List of English-language book publishing companies
- List of university presses
