= House Committee on Defense =

Legislative committee of the Nigerian National Assembly

- House committee providing oversight on defense and security in Nigeria
- Abbreviation: HCD
- Founder: National Assembly of Nigeria
- Type: Standing Committee
- Legal status: Active
- Purpose: Legislative oversight on defense policies, armed forces, and national security
- Headquarters: National Assembly, Abuja, Nigeria
- Region served: Nigeria
- Official language: English
- Chairman: Babajimi Benson
- Deputy Chairman: Yusuf Adamu Gagdi
- Main organ: Federal House of Representatives
- Parent organization: National Assembly of Nigeria
- Affiliations: Ministry of Defense
- Website: www.nass.gov.ng
- Remarks: Oversees Nigeria's defense sector, armed forces, and national security policies

The House Committee on Defence commonly known as HCD is a standing committee of the Nigerian House of Representatives tasked with legislative oversight of the Ministry of Defence and the Nigerian Armed Forces. It is currently chaired by Honourable Babajimi Benson. The committee addresses defense policies, military operations, and national security challenges while advocating for improved funding and infrastructure to strengthen Nigeria's defense capabilities.

== Jurisdiction ==
The House Committee on Defence has jurisdiction over Nigeria's defense policy, military operations, the organization and reform of the Ministry of Defence (Nigeria) and the Nigerian Armed Forces, counter-terrorism efforts, defense procurement and infrastructure, military cooperation with international partners, technology transfer and export controls, intelligence and security programs, and the safeguarding of Nigeria's territorial integrity.

== History ==
The committee operates within the framework established by the Constitution of the Federal Republic of Nigeria Sections 88 and 89 of the Constitution empower the National Assembly to conduct investigations and summon individuals to provide evidence on matters relating to national security, including defense. These constitutional provisions necessitate the creation of specialized committees, such as the House Committee on Defense, to oversee the Ministry of Defence and the Nigerian Armed Forces.

Through its legislative authority, the committee has played a major role in shaping Nigeria's defense policies, addressing national security challenges, and ensuring that the armed forces remain adequately prepared to safeguard its territorial integrity. Its evolution has aligned with the changing security landscape, continuing to adapt to new threats and defense requirements. The committee remains integral to Nigeria's national security framework, working closely with the Ministry of Defence and other key agencies to enhance military capabilities and preparedness.

== Members ==
=== 9th Assembly (2019–2023) ===
Members of the House Committee on Defence (10th Assembly)
Position	Name	Party	Constituency
Chairman	Hon. Babajimi Benson	APC	Ikorodu Federal Constituency
Deputy Chairman	Hon. Yusuf Gagdi	APC	Pankshin/Kanke/Kanam Federal Constituency

=== 10th Assembly (2023–2027) ===
Members of the House Committee on Defence (10th Assembly)
Position	Name	Party	Constituency
Chairman	Hon. Babajimi Benson	APC	Ikorodu Federal Constituency
Deputy Chairman	Hon. Yusuf Gagdi	APC	Pankshin/Kanke/Kanam Federal Constituency

== See also ==
- Ministry of Defence (Nigeria)
- House Committee on Finance (Nigeria)
- House Committee on Aids, Loans and Debt Management
- Universal Basic Education Commission
- National Assembly of Nigeria
