= Caxton Press (United States) =

Book publisher

- Parent company: The Caxton Printers Ltd.
- Founded: 1925
- Founder: J. H. Gipson
- Country of origin: United States
- Headquarters location: Caldwell, Idaho
- Publication types: Books
- Official website: www.caxtonpress.com

Caxton Press (formerly known as Caxton Printers, a division of its parent company, The Caxton Printers Ltd.) is a book publisher located in Caldwell, Idaho, United States, founded in 1925. It is also a distributor of books from the University of Idaho Press, Black Canyon Communications, Snake Country Publishing, Historic Idaho Series and Alpha Omega Publishing. It was founded by J. H. Gipson to give western writers, particularly of non-fiction about the people or culture of the Western United States, a vehicle for publication of their work.

== History ==
It is the publishing division of The Caxton Printers Ltd., founded in Caldwell in 1895 by A. E. Gipson, as the Gem State Rural Publishing Company, renamed to its present name in 1903. Regular publishing of books began in 1925. The Caxton Printers was named after William Caxton, printer of the first-ever book in English, in 1474.

The publishing division was itself named Caxton Printers until around 1995, when it was changed to Caxton Press in order to differentiate it from the parent company, which now also engages in non-publishing business, including selling office supplies and school supplies.

== University of Idaho Press ==
The University of Idaho Press was a university press that was associated with the University of Idaho; it is now a division of Caxton Press. The University of Idaho Press essentially closed in 2004, but came to an agreement with Caxton to publish most of their content, with the exceptions of the Hemingway Review and Steinbeck Studies, which were continued by the English department of the University of Idaho; and Native Plants Journal.

== See also ==
- List of English-language book publishing companies
- List of university presses
- Lawrence H. Gipson
