= Abel Olajide Olorunnisola =

Nigerian educator and agricultural engineer

Abel Olajide Olorunnisola is a Nigerian professor of wood products engineering, agricultural engineer and university administrator. He served as the Vice-Chancellor of Dominion University, Ibadan, and previously served as Dean of the Postgraduate School at the University of Ibadan. He is the appointed Vice-Chancellor of Bells University of Technology, with his appointment taking effect on 1 August 2026.

== Early life and education ==
Olorunnisola obtained a Bachelor of Engineering (Honours) degree in agricultural engineering from the Federal University of Technology Akure in 1989. He subsequently earned a Master of Science degree in wood products engineering in 1992 and a Doctor of Philosophy degree in wood products engineering in 1997 from the University of Ibadan. He also obtained a Professional Diploma in Management from the Nigerian Institute of Management in 1999.

== Career ==
Olorunnisola joined the University of Ibadan as a Lecturer II on 2 January 1993 and became a full professor on 1 October 2006.

He served as Dean of the Postgraduate School, University of Ibadan, from 2010 to 2014 and was later the head of the Department of Wood Products Engineering. Between 2019 and 2021, he was a member of the university's Governing Council.

In November 2021, he assumed office as the Vice-Chancellor of Dominion University, Ibadan.

== Research ==
His research is mostly centered in renewable energy, biomass conversion, sustainable building materials, wood products engineering, bamboo and rattan development, and agricultural processing technologies. Olorunnisola has authored more than 90 peer-reviewed publications in the fields of wood science, renewable energy, and engineering.

== Professional memberships ==
He is a Fellow of the Nigerian Society of Engineers (FNSE), the Materials Science and Technology Society of Nigeria (FMSN), and the Nigerian Institute of Management (FNIM). He is also a registered engineer with the Council for the Regulation of Engineering in Nigeria (COREN).

== Awards and honours ==
He has received honours including the African Academy of Sciences Capacity Building in Forestry Research Grant Award and the TWAS–CSIR Postdoctoral Fellowship. He has also served as President of the Materials Science and Technology Society of Nigeria.
