= Caleb University =

University in Nigeria

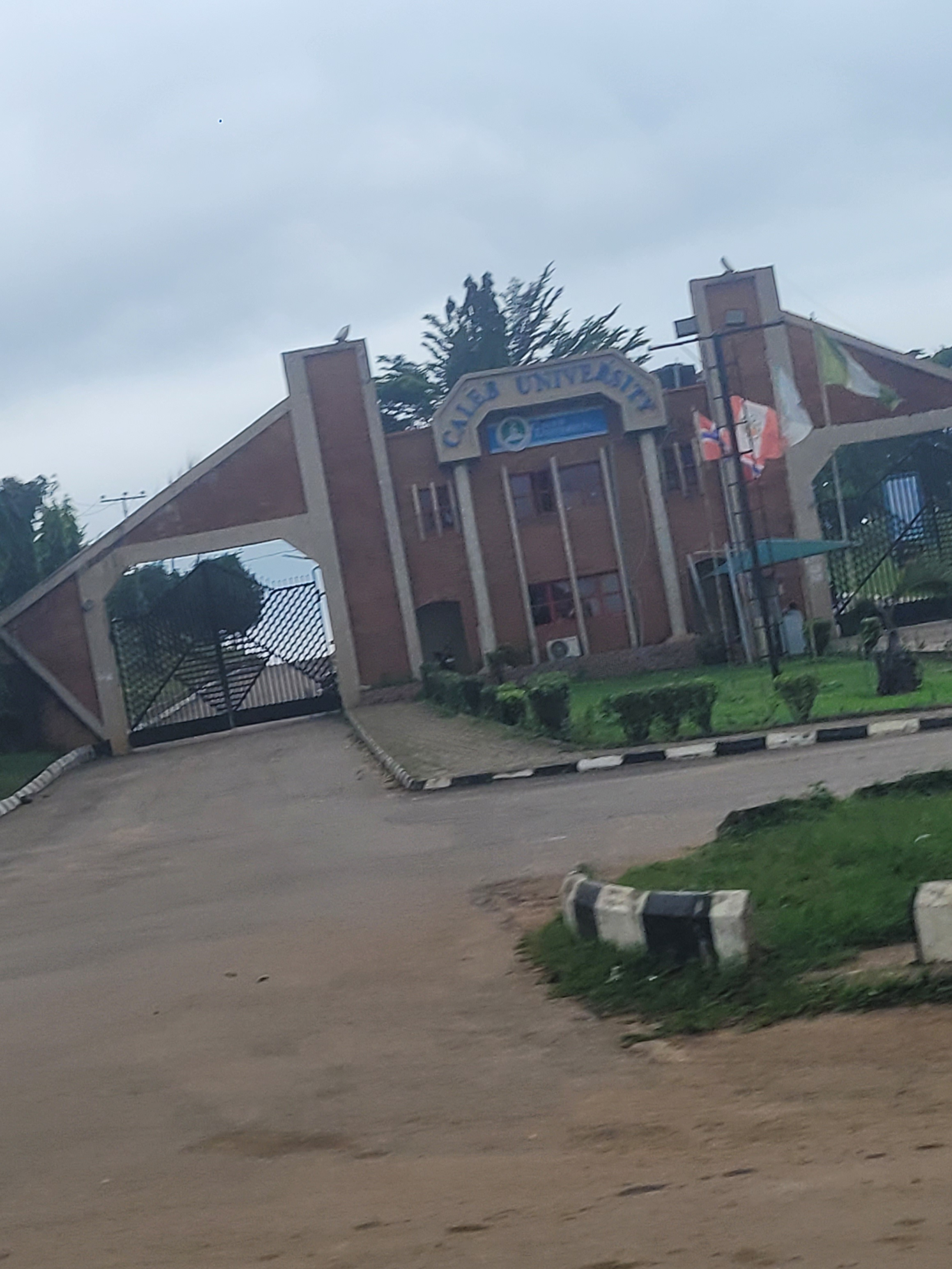
- Motto: For God and Humanity
- Type: Private
- Chancellor: Pastor (Mrs.) Foluke Adenike Adeboye
- Vice-Chancellor: Professor Olalekan Asikhia
- Location: Imota, Lagos State, Nigeria
- Website: http://www.calebuniversity.edu.ng/

Caleb University is a private university located in Imota, Lagos State, Nigeria. It was founded in 2007.

== History ==
Caleb University is a private university located in Imota, Lagos State, Nigeria. It received a licence from the Federal Government of Nigeria in May 2007 and began academic activities in January 2008. The university developed from the Caleb Group of Schools founded by educationist Oladega Adebogun, who earlier established Caleb International School in 1986.

== Vice-Chancellors ==
No.	Name	Tenure	Notes
1	Ayodeji Olukoju	2010 – 2015	Historian and former Professor at the University of Lagos.
2	Ayandiji Daniel Aina	2015 – 2019	Professor of Computer Science.
3	Nosa Owens-Ibie	2019 – 2025	Professor of Communication and media scholar.
4	Olalekan Asikhia	2025 – present	Former Deputy Vice-Chancellor (Research, Innovation, Strategy and Administration).

== Courses offered in Caleb University ==
Below is a list of courses offered in Caleb University

- Accounting
- Architecture
- Banking and Finance
- Biochemistry
- Building
- Business Administration
- Chemistry
- Christian Religious Knowledge / Studies
- Computer Science
- Criminology
- Economics
- Education and Christian Religious Studies
- English and Literary Studies
- Environmental Management and Toxicology
- Estate Management
- Guidance and Counseling
- History and Diplomatic Studies
- Industrial Chemistry
- Information Systems
- International Relations
- Law
- Mass Communication
- Mathematics
- Microbiology
- Microbiology and Industrial Biotechnology
- Peace Studies And Conflict Resolution
- Philosophy
- Physics
- Physics and Computational Modeling
- Plant Science and Biotechnology
- Political Science
- Psychology
- Quantity Surveying
- Statistics
- Taxation
- Zoology and Aquaculture
- Christian Religious Studies (CRS)
- Cyber Security
