= Faculty of Arts, University of Ibadan =

Faculty of Arts
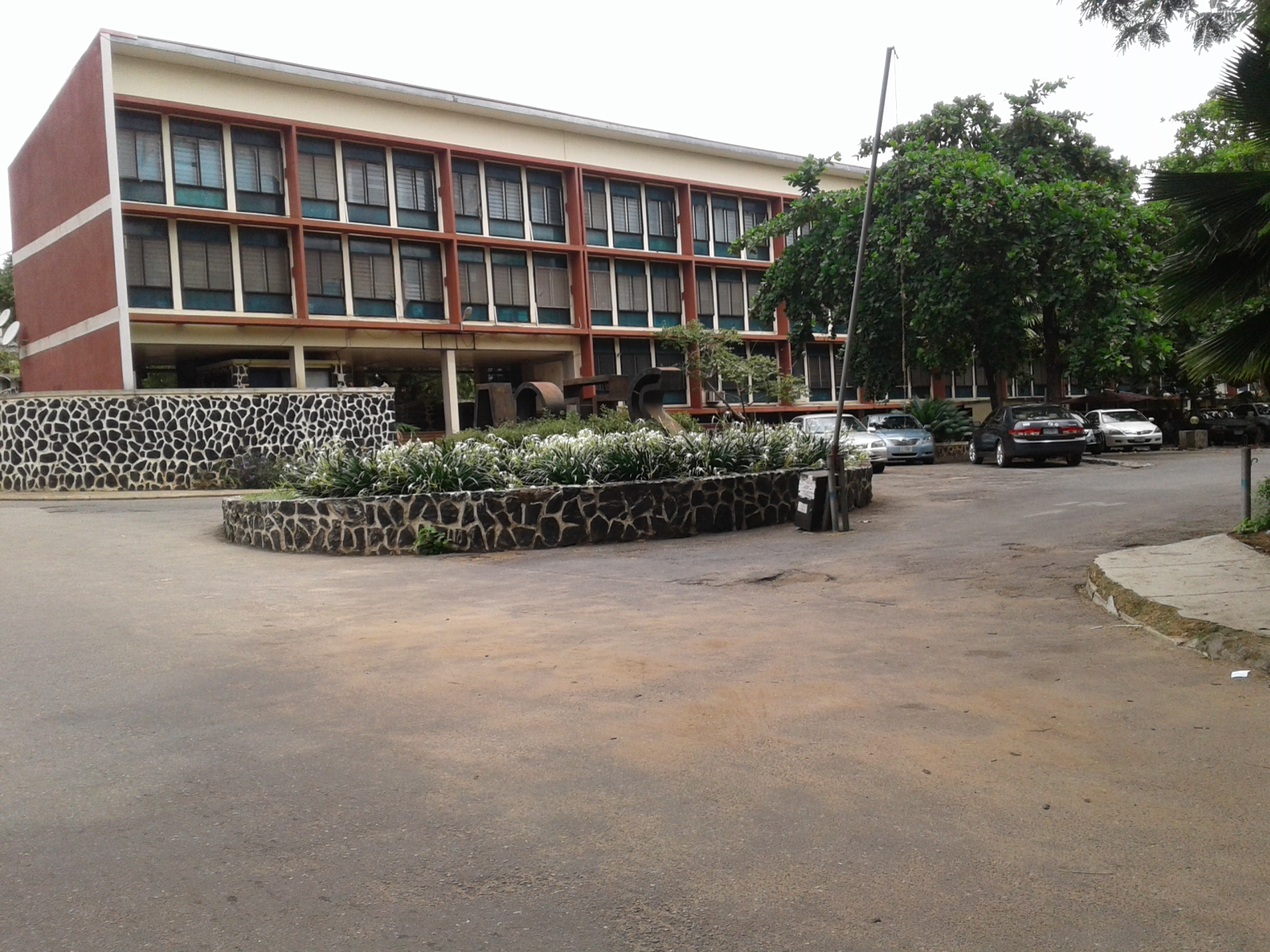
- Faculty of Arts building, University of Ibadan
- Established: 1948
- Dean: Prof. R.O. Olaniyi
- Location: Ibadan, Nigeria
- Campus: Main Campus
- Website: https://www.facultyofartsui.org/

The Faculty of Arts is the flagship faculty of the University of Ibadan, Nigeria, founded in 1948. It provides bachelor's, master's, and doctoral degree programs in humanities, across its 12 departments.

== History ==
The Faculty of Arts at the University of Ibadan was established in 1948. It began in temporary buildings at Eleyele, with just a few lecturers and a small number of students studying for a BA General Degree. At that time, the university was working under a special relationship with the University of London.

The first set of departments included classics, English, geography, history, mathematics, and religious studies. Later on in the year, the English department added phonetics as a sub-department. By 1950, some departments were permitted to run Degree Honours programmes.

In 1953, the faculty moved to its current permanent site between the administrative block and Niger Road. The original premises remained in use until 1960.

Following the University of Ibadan’s transition from its special relationship with the University of London and its attainment of full autonomy in the early 1960s, significant academic restructuring took place within the Faculty of Arts. The BA General Degree was withdrawn and replaced with a restructured degree system that introduced single and combined honours programmes. This restructuring was part of broader curriculum reforms aimed at aligning the university’s academic programmes with African intellectual, cultural, and educational contexts. Two types of Honours Degrees were introduced, wherein students could focus on one course or combine two courses.

New departments were created, including Arabic & Islamic Studies, Linguistics & Nigerian (now African) Languages, and Modern Languages. Mathematics later moved to the Faculty of Science. The School of Drama, which later became Theatre Arts, was also established during this period. Postgraduate studies also began to expand in the faculty.

== List of departments ==
The faculty has 12 different departments with a total of 18 courses in total.

- Arabic and Islamic studies (Arabic studies and Islamic studies)
- Archaeology and Anthropology (Archaeology and Anthropology)
- Classical Studies
- Communication and Language Arts
- English
- European Studies (French, Russian, and German)
- History
- Linguistics and African Languages (Linguistics, Yorùbá, and Igbo)
- Music
- Philosophy
- Religious Studies
- Theater Arts

== Academic reputation ==
The Faculty of Arts is widely regarded as one of the leading humanities faculties in Nigeria and West Africa, with significant contributions to African linguistics, literature, and cultural studies.

== Research and scholarly contributions ==
The faculty is a major centre for research in African languages and cultural studies. It has contributed to the documentation and analysis of Nigerian languages, particularly Yoruba and Igbo, as well as studies in oral literature and performance arts.

Faculty members have also contributed to international scholarship in linguistics, philosophy, and African history.

== Notable academics and alumni ==
The Faculty of Arts has produced and hosted several prominent scholars and intellectuals, including contributors to African literature, linguistics, and humanities research.

- Chinua Achebe: Author of Things Fall Apart.
- Emeka Anyaoku: Third Secretary-General of the Commonwealth.
- J. P. Clark: Poet and playwright.
- Kayode Fayemi: Former Governor of Ekiti State.
- Akin Mabogunje: Geographer and the first African president of the International Geographical Union
- Godwin Obaseki: Former Governor of Edo State.
- Christopher Okigbo: Modernist poet.
- Folake Onayemi: First Nigerian woman to earn a PhD in Classics and first Black woman Professor of Classics in Sub-Saharan Africa.
- Femi Osofisan: Playwright, poet, and professor.
- Niyi Osundare: Poet and professor of English.
- Wole Soyinka: Author, and the first African to receive the Nobel Prize in Literature.
- Tekena Tamuno: Historian, former Vice-Chancellor of the University of Ibadan.
