= Oluremi Oyo =

Felicia Oluwaremilekun Oyo

Managing Director of the News Agency of Nigeria
- In office July 2007 – 2013

Personal details
- Born: 12 October 1952 Ilorin Kwara State, Nigeria
- Died: 1 October 2014 (aged 61) United Kingdom

Oluremi Oyo (12 October 1952 – 1 October 2014) was a Nigerian journalist.

== Early life and education ==
Remi Oyo was born on 12 October 1952 in Ilorin, Kwara State, North Central Nigeria. She attended the University of Lagos earning a bachelor's degree in mass communication and journalism. She got a postgraduate diploma in international relations from the Nigerian Institute of International Affairs. She further obtained a master's degree in international relations at the University of Kent in the United Kingdom.

== Career ==
She was appointed Senior Special Assistant/Spokesperson of Media and Publicity to then Nigeria's President Olusegun Obasanjo in 2003, and was reinstated in 2007. Her career in journalism began as a reporter in 1973 with the Nigerian Broadcasting Corporation (NBC). She then joined News Agency of Nigeria (NAN) as a desk editor in 1981, but eventually its principal editor.

From NAN, she joined the Inter Press Service (IPS) as the Nigerian Bureau Chief and later rose to become IPS West African Bureau Chief.

She first served as the Secretary to the Nigerian Guild of Editors (NGE). Later, she was elected by her professional colleagues as the first woman to be the President of the NGE. She eventually served two consecutive terms from 1999 to 2003.

Shortly after her time with the former president, she was announced as the managing director of the News Agency of Nigeria.

Military dictator Abdulsalami Abubakar appointed her to the 1999 Constitution Drafting Committee. In 2006 she was awarded a national OON by President Olusegun Obasanjo. She later received awards from the National Council of Catholic Women Organisation of Nigeria, the Nigerian Institute of Management (NIM) and the Nigerian Institute of Peace Administrators.

== Personal life and death ==
She was married to Vincent Oyo, a journalist, and they had two children.

Oyo died on 1 October 2014 at 62 years of age of cancer while receiving treatment in the United Kingdom, and is buried at the Yaba Cemetery, Lagos.

== Awards ==
- Oyo was awarded the national award of Officer of the Order of Niger, OON, in 2006.

== See also ==
- Moji Makanjuola
