= Dominican University Ibadan =

Private university in Oyo State, Nigeria

- Motto: In veritate libertas
- Type: Private
- Established: 22 November 2016; 9 years ago
- Affiliations: NUC
- Visitor: Master of the Order of Preachers Gerard Timoner III
- Vice-Chancellor: Professor Jacinta A. Opara
- Location: Samonda Ibadan, Oyo State, Nigeria
- Campus: Sub-urban
- Website: dui.edu.ng

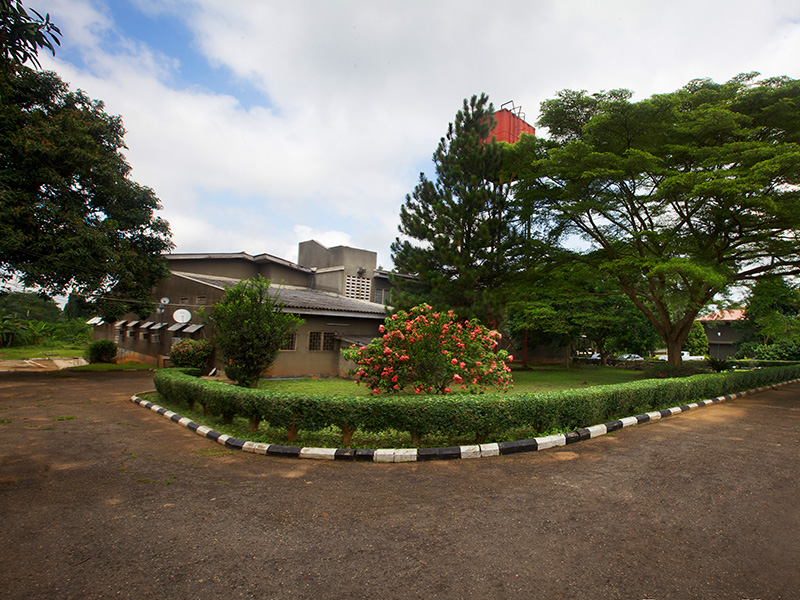
A picture of the lecture area of Dominican University Ibadan

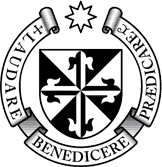
Dominican Shield

The Dominican University Ibadan is a private university in Samonda, Ibadan of Oyo State, Nigeria.

== History ==
The Dominican University Ibadan was established in 2016 by the Order of Preachers (Dominican Order)'s province of St. Joseph the Worker in Nigeria and Ghana, to be an institution of Catholic higher education in Nigeria.

It was licensed by the National Universities Commission (NUC) on 22 November 2016.

The university was operating as an institute awarding bachelor's degrees in philosophy affiliated with the University of Ibadan since 1993 until its accreditation.

== Senior personnel ==
- Abel Olajide Olorunnisola, vice chancellor
- Prof. Jacinta A. Opara was appointed in 2024 as the first female and second substantive Vice-chancellor of the university
