= Lola Kola =

Nigerian psychiatrist and medical sociologist

Dr. Lola Kola Ph.D
- Citizenship: Nigerian
- Occupations: Academic and researcher
- Known for: Global Mental Health Research

Academic background
- Education: University of Ibadan

Academic work
- Discipline: medical sociology and mental health
- Institutions: World Health Organization, University of Ibadan and Lead City University

Lola Kola is a psychiatrist, medical sociologist, global mental health researcher, and academic in the Department of Psychiatry, University of Ibadan.

== Education and career ==
Kola received a doctoral degree (Ph.D.) in medical sociology from the University of Ibadan. Between 2011 and 2014, she served as a national consultant for mental health at the World Health Organization (WHO) country office in Abuja, Nigeria and coordinated the adaptation and implementation of the WHO Mental Health Gap Action Programme (mhGAP). She has contributed to the integration of mobile health applications in primary care for teenage mothers living with depression.

She was named an Emerging Global Leader by the National Institutes of Health, USA, from 2018 to 2024, and her work has been supported by the UK Medical Research Council, the Wellcome Trust, and the International Development Research Centre, Canada.

She is an adjunct associate professor in the Department of Sociology and Psychology at Lead City University and a senior research fellow at the WHO Collaborating Centre for Research and Training in Mental Health, Neurosciences, and Drug and Alcohol Abuse, within the Department of Psychiatry, College of Medicine, University of Ibadan.
