= Adeola Adenikinju =

Nigerian Professor of Economics

Professor Adeola Adenikinju
- Citizenship: Nigeria
- Education: University of Ibandan
- Occupations: Teaching and research
- Employer(s): University of Ibadan, Nigeria
- Notable work: Analysis of the cost of infrastructure failures in a developing economy: The case of the electricity sector in Nigeria. Electric infrastructure failures in Nigeria: a survey-based analysis of the costs and adjustment responses. COVID-19's impacts on incomes and food consumption in urban and rural areas are surprisingly similar: Evidence from five African countries.

Adeola Adenikinju is a professor of economics. He is also a research professor at the Centre for Econometrics and Allied Research with research interests in Petroleum and Energy Economics, Economic modeling, and Economic Development Issues.

== Education ==
He has BSc in economics. He also has master's degree and PhD all in economics, and from the University of Ibadan, Nigeria. He began his academic journey as a Lecturer 11 in 1994 and rose to a professor on October 1, 2006. He has served as an external examiner to many universities, locally and internationally.

== Career ==
Professor Adenikinju was the founding Director of the Centre for Petroleum, Energy Economics and Law (CPEEL) at the University of Ibadan from 2012 to 2021. During President Muhammadu Buhari's dispensation, he served as a Senior Special Assistant to the Office of the Chief Economic Adviser. Later, President Muhammadu Buhari appointed him a member of the Monetary Policy Committee of the Central Bank of Nigeria.

He served as the 44th President, Nigerian Economic Society.

== Activities ==
Adenikinju attended the induction ceremony of the graduating economics students of Pan-Atlantic University (PAU), Lagos. During his speech, he enjoined them to shape the economy of the country. As the president of the Nigeria Economic Society, Adenikinju was a participant at the 65th NES Annual Conference. He made a presentation on policy recommendations aimed at addressing the critical socio-economic challenges in Nigeria, themed, “Nigeria’s Socio-Economic Challenges: Lessons from the Implementation and Outcomes of Structural Adjustment Programmes.” The insights emphasized on food security and agricultural policies.

He also led the organization on the 66th NES Annual Conference, where he addressed Press Conference and hosted the vice president of Nigeria – His Excellency Kashim Shettima. He presented policy recommendations while acknowledging the relevance of the economic reforms of the government.

According to Kingsgate Advisors Institute, Prof. Adenikiju has worked with leading multilateral institutions such as the International Monetary Fund (IMF), World Bank, African Development Bank (AfDB), United Nations Economic Commission for Africa (UNECA), United Nations Institute for Development Planning (UNIDEP), and the European Commission. He is also known to have secured over $1.9 million in research grants from global institutions, including GIZ, IDRC, NLNG, FOSTER, and SOAS-UCL.

== Awards and recognition ==
Professor Adeola Adenikinju was nominated for the award of Distinguished Leadership in Academic and Policy Excellence by the management and editorial board of Sunshine Standard Magazine. The award was slated for 1 March 2026, at OSPDC Event Centre, Ijapo Estate, Akure.

He was commended by the Oyo state chapter of the Nigeria Economic Society for his outstanding, transformative, and innovative leadership, fostering constructive dialogue between policymakers, academics, and industry stakeholders, and for promoting greater synergy between economic research and national development goals, which elevated the profile of the society on both national and international fronts.

== Publications ==
Analysis of the cost of infrastructure failures in a developing economy: The case of the electricity sector in Nigeria.

Electric infrastructure failures in Nigeria: a survey-based analysis of the costs and adjustment responses.

COVID-19's impacts on incomes and food consumption in urban and rural areas are surprisingly similar: Evidence from five African countries.
