= Native Plants Journal =

- Discipline: Botany
- Language: English
- Edited by: Stephen Love

Publication details
- History: 2000–present
- Publisher: University of Wisconsin Press
- Frequency: Triannually

Standard abbreviations
- ISO 4: Native Plants J.

Indexing
- ISSN: 1522-8339 (print); 1548-4785 (web)
- LCCN: 2004212092
- JSTOR: 15228339
- OCLC no.: 226187710

Links
- Journal homepage; Online access; Online archive

Native Plants Journal is a triannual peer-reviewed scientific journal established to disperse "practical information about planting and growing North American (Canada, Mexico, and the United States) native plants for conservation, restoration, reforestation, landscaping, highway corridors, and related uses." It is published by the University of Wisconsin Press and is an official partner journal of the Society for Ecological Restoration.

== History ==
The journal was established in March 2000 as a cooperative effort between the University of Idaho and the USDA Forest Service, with assistance from the Natural Resources Conservation Service and the USDA Agricultural Research Service. The Reforestation, Nurseries and Genetic Resources department of the USDA Forest Service were the originators of the idea of having a journal that covers native plant species. This led to an agreement in the spring of 1999 between the Service and the Forest Research Nursery at the University of Idaho to publish material that would be incorporated into the first issue of the journal. The journal was published by the Indiana University Press between the fall of 2004 and fall of 2010. It moved to the University of Wisconsin Press in the spring of 2011. The founding editor-in-chief was R. Kasten Dumroese.

== Abstracting and indexing ==
The journal is abstracted and indexed in CAB Abstracts, EBSCO databases, and ProQuest databases.
