= Ayandiji Daniel Aina =

Nigerian academic

- Occupation: Researcher

Ayandiji Daniel Aina is a Nigerian researcher and a past Vice Chancellor of Caleb University, Nigeria.

== Education ==
Ayandiji earned his first degree which is the PG Diploma in Journalism from the Nigerian Institute of Journalism, Ogba, Lagos in the year 1991. He pursued and earned his B.A ( Hons.) degree in Philosophy and Political Science from the University of Ibadan in 1988, after which he went back to University of Ibadan in 1992 for his master's degree in political science and PhD in Political Science also with the same university.

== Career ==
Ayandiji was initially a media specialist with work experience (approximately a decade) with the Lagos-based Diplomat International Press and the Nigerian Daily Times Plc).

During his stay in Babcock University, Aina became the Head of Department for two terms (1999–2003), Dean of the Faculty of Management and Social Sciences (2003–2006) after then he became the Chief of Staff to the President/Vice-Chancellor (2006–2008), he then pursued and earned the Dean of School of Postgraduate School (2010–2011) afterwards he then became the Dean Babcock Business School (2013–2015). He was also Visiting Professor and Foundation Head of Department of Political Science and International Relations, Osun State University (2009). He was appointed as the Dean of the new Babcock Business School upon return from Adeleke University where he served as pioneer President-Vice-Chancellor.

== Personal life ==
Ayandiji's religion is Christianity. He is married to Rachael who is a University Lecturer in Information Resources Management and has three children.
