= Odosenlu Alaro =

Odosenlu-Alaro is a town in Ijebu North East Local Government Area of Ogun State in South West Nigeria, West Africa.
