= Diamond FM (Ibadan) =

Diamond 101.1 FM
- Ibadan; Nigeria
- Frequency: 101.1 MHz

Programming
- Format: Contemporary, Hip-Hop, Classical, News and Sport, Talk

Ownership
- Owner: University of Ibadan (Campus radio)

History
- First air date: 30 October 2008

Diamond 101.1 FM is the community radio station of the University of Ibadan in Nigeria. The station was officially launched on 30 October 2008, on Thursday, by the executive governor of Niger State, Dr. Mu'azu Babangida Alliu, as part of activities marking the 60th anniversary of the university.

The station is received by listeners in the city of Ibadan and nearby towns and cities. It broadcasts from the Media Centre of the University of Ibadan.

It broadcasts songs, sports and infomercials.

== History ==
The initiative that produced the radio station emanated from a discussion between the acting Head of Department of Agricultural Extension and Rural Development [Dr. A. A. Ladele] and Dr. M. K. Yahaya, in 2005, on the need to adopt the briefcase radio facility as a tool to disseminate improved farm technologies to farmers within the catchment of the university. It was immediately reasoned that a more robust facility for the use of the entire University would suffice.

Dr F.K. Sanwo of the Department of Forest Resources Management (who later relocated to Olabisi Onabanjo University in Ogun State) had submitted a proposal for a campus radio station in 1984 but it did not come to reality. In 1988, Dr Matthew Umukoro of the Department of Theatre Arts also made another attempt that was not successful owing to lack of funds. It was then thought that radio could indeed assist in checking incessant students’ unrest on campus.

Professor Ayo Falase agreed to the proposal from the acting Head of the Department of Agricultural Extension and Rural Development, requesting him to constitute a committee to come up with a detailed proposal with the cost implications. The call to various Department Heads for representatives gave rise to the UI Community Radio Project Committee. This committee worked assiduously to put together a realistic proposal. The radio project implementation, however, did not commence before Professor Ayo Falase completed his term as Vice Chancellor. During Professor Olufemi Bamiro's tenure as Vice Chancellor, the project progressed rapidly due to his keen interest in the project. With the engagement of Sound Broadcast Communications under the leadership of Engineer S. Friday Aizeboje, the radio project was completed in July 2008, ready for test transmission.

The radio station was designed to be student-friendly, volunteer driven, inclusive and interactive by providing opportunities for members of the university community to share knowledge, ideas and expertise relating to the University of Ibadan. The name, logo and call phrase of the radio station were sourced competitively through invitation widely advertised in the University Bulletin. A final-year student's Segun Michael entry from the Department of Human Kinetics, Faculty of Education won the prize for the station's name and Sambo Mohammed devised the call-phrase. "Diamond FM" was chosen as a nod to its establishment on the university's 60th anniversary.
