= Gbemiga Ogunleye =

Nigerian lawyer and journalist

provost of the Nigerian Institute of Journalism
- Incumbent
- Assumed office March 2, 2015-2020

Gbemiga Ogunleye is a Nigerian lawyer, journalist, media scholar, and the former Provost of the Nigerian Institute of Journalism.

== Education ==
He obtained a bachelor's degree in laws from the Lagos state University and a master's degree in media and communication from Pan-Atlantic University but received a Post Graduate Diplomas in Journalism. He also received a Bachelor of Arts (B.A.) degree in linguistics from the University of Benin.

== Career ==
Ogunleye was the Head of Corporate Communications at Arik Air, a Nigerian airline operating a domestic, regional and international flight network. He also served as the Deputy Editor-in-Chief of The Punch, a Nigerian daily newspaper. Prior to his appointment as provost of the Nigerian Institute of Journalism to succeed Dr. Elizabeth Ikem, he was the director of News and Current Affairs at TVC News, Nigeria.
