= African Economic History =

- Discipline: Economic history
- Language: English, French, Portuguese

Publication details
- Former name: African Economic History Review
- History: 1974-present
- Publisher: University of Wisconsin Press (United States)
- Frequency: Biannually

Standard abbreviations
- ISO 4: Afr. Econ. Hist.

Indexing
- ISSN: 0145-2258 (print); 2163-9108 (web)
- LCCN: 2006-237056
- JSTOR: 01452258
- OCLC no.: 60619248

Links
- Journal homepage

African Economic History is an annual academic journal covering research on all aspects of the economics of the African past, including its historiography, with an emphasis on sub-Saharan, colonial and post-colonial themes. It was established in 1974 by the African Studies Program of the University of Wisconsin–Madison as the African Economic History Review and obtained its current title in 1976. Subsequently, it was associated with the Harriet Tubman Institute for Research on Africa and Its Diasporas at York University. The journal is now published by the University of Wisconsin Press.
