= Edward Gabkwet =

Nigerian Air Force officer (born 1971)

Air Vice Marshal Edward Gabkwet
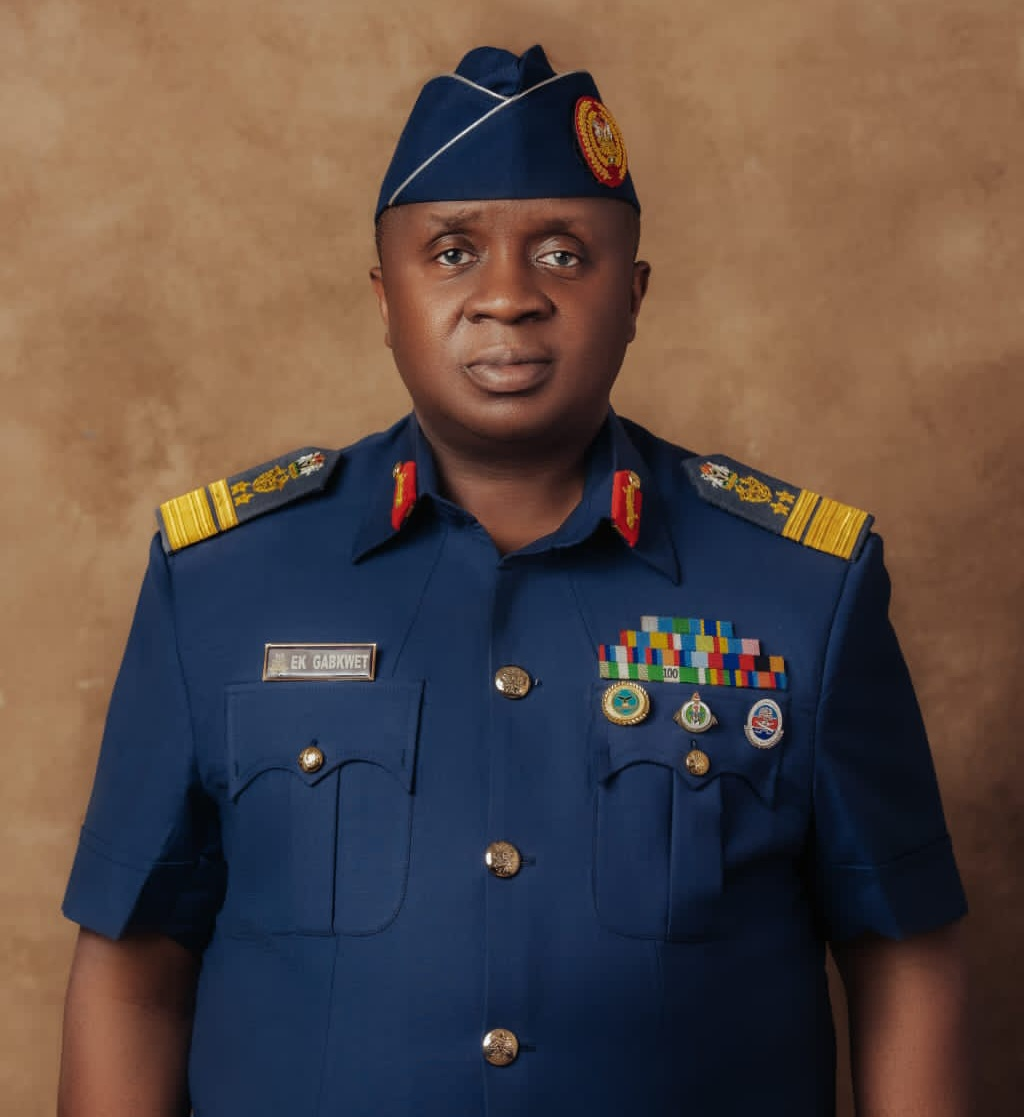
- Air Vice Marshal Edward Gabkwet

Nigerian Air Force Director of Public Relations and Information
- Incumbent
- Assumed office 3 July 2023
- Chief of the Air Staff: Air Vice Marshal Hassan Abubakar
- Preceded by: Air Commodore Ayodele Famuyiwa
- In office 9 March 2021 – 6 January 2023
- Chief of the Air Staff: Air Marshal Isiaka Oladayo Amao
- Succeeded by: Air Commodore Ayodele Famuyiwa

Personal details
- Born: 23 December 1971 (age 54) Kaduna, Nigeria

Military service
- Allegiance: Nigeria
- Branch/service: Nigerian Air Force
- Years of service: 1996–present
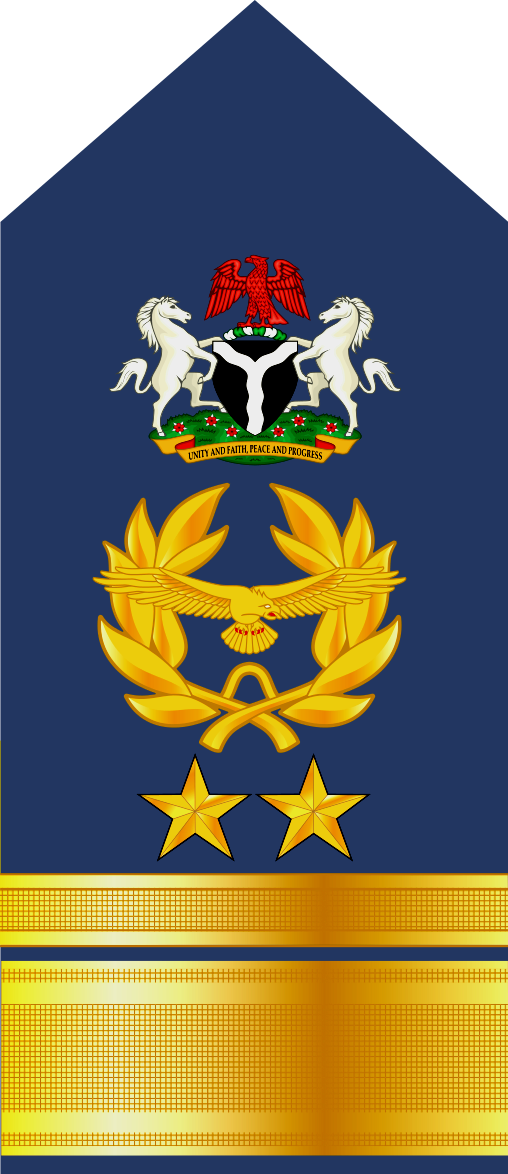
- Rank

Air Vice Marshal Edward Gabkwet (born 23 December 1971) is a Nigerian air force officer who is the 17th director of Public Relations and Information of the Nigerian Air Force.

== Early life and education ==
Gabkwet had his early education at Baptist Primary School, Jos South from 1977 to 1983 and thereafter proceeded to the prestigious Saint Joseph’s College, Vom, near Kuru in Jos South where he obtained his General Certificate of Education. He then proceeded to study veterinary medicine at the Ahmadu Bello University, Zaria. He was commissioned as an officer cadets of 42nd Regular Combatant Course of the Nigerian Defence Academy in August 1990. Gabkwet later graduated on 16 August 1996 with a bachelor’s degree in Biological Sciences and was subsequently commissioned as a Pilot Officer of the Nigerian Air Force.

== Military career ==
Air Vice Marshal Edward Gabkwet has held several appointments in the course of his military career. In 1998, he was the Group Public Relations Officer (GPRO) at Air Weapon School (Now 407 Air Combat Training Group), Kainji. At various times, he served as the Command Public Relations Officer (CPRO) at Tactical Air Command Makurdi, Training Command, (Now Air Training Command), Kaduna as well as Logistics Command, Lagos. Air Commodore Gabkwet was also a United Nations Military observer at the Democratic republic of Congo between 2004 and 2005 where he also acted as the Assistant spokesman attached to the Office of the Force Commander. He also served as the first press officer to the Chief of the Air Staff between 2010 and 2012. As the Air Attaché, Edward was, for 2 years the secretary of the Africa and Middle East Defence Attaches in China, a socio-cultural group catering to the military interest of Africa and Middle Eastern Nations in China. In 2018, he was appointed as the Command Training officer at the Ground Training Command Enugu. Until his appointment as the 17th Director of Public Relations and Information (DOPRI), he was a member of Directing Staff and Director Coordination at the Air Force War College, Makurdi. Gabkwet served as the DOPRI from 9 March 2021 to 6 January 2023. He was reappointed DOPRI on 3 July 2023 after serving as the Commander 551 NAF Station Jos, Plateau State.
