= Premium Pension Limited =

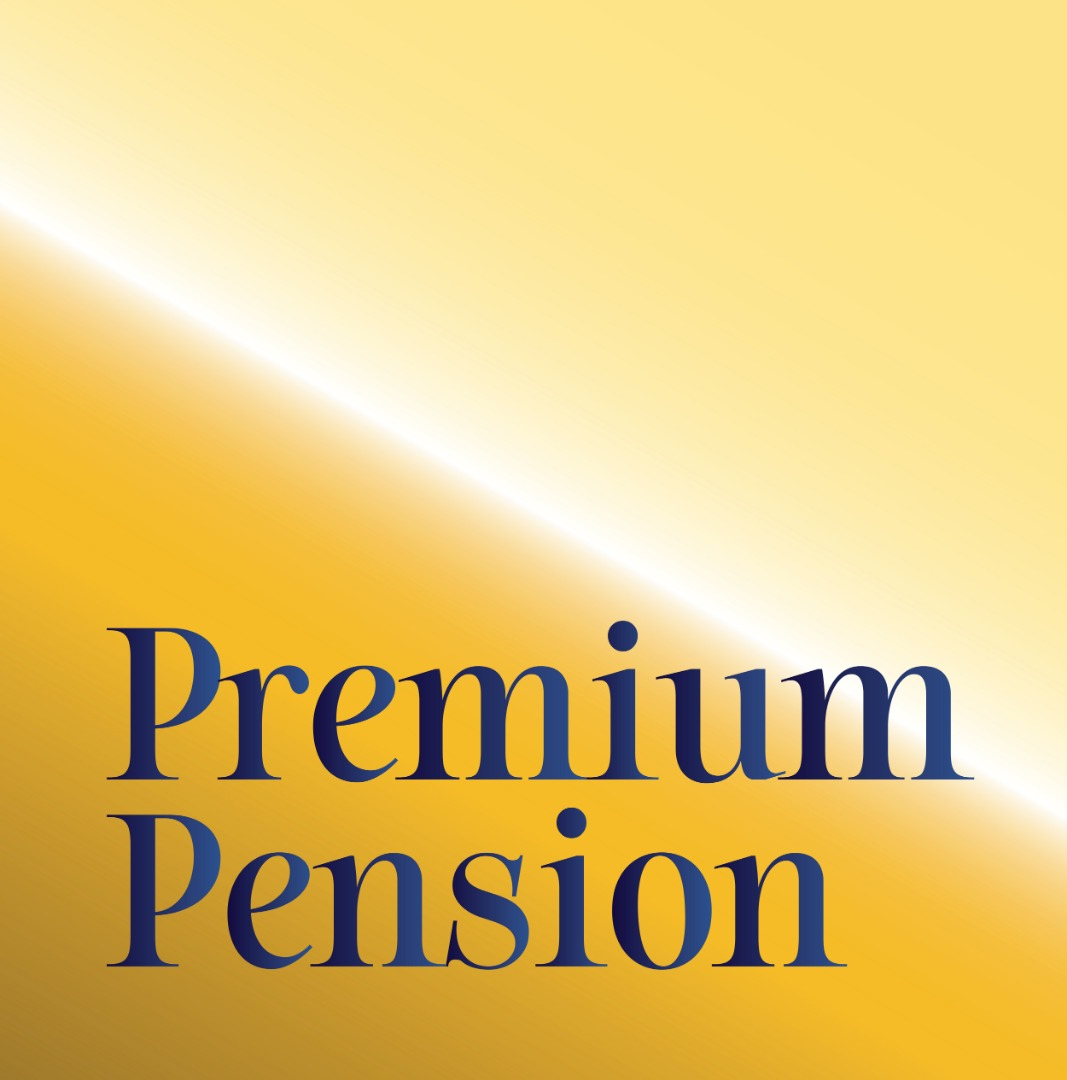
- Type: Public company
- Industry: Financial services
- Founded: Nigeria, 2005
- Headquarters: Abuja, FCT, Nigeria
- Key people: Gen. Bitrus Kwaji (Chairman), Hamisu Bala Idris (Managing Director/Chief Executive Officer, MD/CEO)
- Products: Retirement Savings Account, Legacy Asset Management, Pension Advisory Service, Cross Border Pension Plans and Voluntary Contribution.
- Website: www.premiumpension.com

Premium Pension Limited' (PPL) is a leading Pension Fund Administrator (PFA) in Nigeria which provides a range of products and services to clients based in all 36 states of Nigeria, including the F.C.T. Premium Pension Limited is licensed by the National Pension Commission in December 2005, under the new Pension Reform Act, 2004. The company took off in 2005 with an initial share capital of ₦500 million but has grown to a total shareholders’ funds of ₦1 Trillion.

Premium Pension Limited is organised as a network, comprising six business divisions: Retirement Savings Account, Additional Voluntary Contribution (AVC), Legacy Asset Management, Pension Advisory Service and Cross Border Pension Plan

== History ==
Premium Pension was licensed in December 2005 by the National Pension Commission. Premium Pension Limited took off with an initial share capital of ₦500 million but has grown to a total shareholders’ funds of over ₦1 Trillion, as at December 2022. In August 2015, Premium Pension Limited was conferred with the Award for Mass Mobilisation of Pension Asset, at the Commerce and Industry Awards by the Lagos Chambers of Commerce and Industry, LCCI. In November 2015, Premium Pension Limited received the UK’s International Organization for Standardization (ISO) certificate on information security management system by the British Standard Institute, becoming the first Pension Fund Administrator (PFA) in Nigeria to receive the certification. Premium also received certification on Information Security Management System (ISMS) by the British Standard Institute in 2013

== Operations ==
Premium Pension Limited is staffed by professionals in areas of Investment, IT, Customer Service, Marketing and Operations. Premium Pension Limited has branches and service centres located across the 36 states of Nigeria, including the FCT.
