= Moji Makanjuola =

Nigerian, Health journalist and broadcaster

- Born: Moji; 8 September 1968 (age 57); Kwara State, Nigeria
- Citizenship: Nigerian
- Occupations: Journalist; broadcaster; cinematographer
- Employers: Nigerian Television Authority; National Television Broadcast, Kwara State; National Health Insurance Authority; Member of the Order of the Federal Republic (MFR); International Society of Media in Public Health (ISMP)
- Notable work: Nigerian Association of Women Journalists (NAWOJ); Health Journalism: A Journey with Moji Makanjuola

Moji Makanjuola (MFR) is a Nigerian, veteran journalist and broadcaster. She was a former president of the "Nigerian Association of Women Journalists (NAWOJ) and loved"

== Background and career ==
Moji Makanjuola, a Kwara State-born health reporter is one of the Nigerian broadcast journalists who has contributed significantly to the improvement and development of journalism in Nigeria especially in the area of health journalism.

She is a media consultant to UN Women, who had also worked for decades in the Nigerian Television Authority (NTA) where she rose to the position of head of health and gender desk before her retirement. She was a pioneer member of the Center for Diseases Control, CDC Atlanta in the USA.

Before retiring from NTA, she had earlier worked in the then National Television Broadcast, Kwara State, Nigeria where she was their first television announcer.

Makanjuola was also the head of the Presentation and Reportorial Units of NTA between 1980 and 1985. After retiring from the Nigeria Television Authority (NTA) as pioneer head of the Health and Gender Desk, she continued working for NTA on a contract basis. Makanjuola is also a cinematographer and the chief executive officer of Bronz and Onyx, an integrated marketing communications and strategy company.

She is a one-time president of the Nigerian Association of Women Journalists (NAWOJ). She is the author of a book, Health Journalism: A Journey with Moji Makanjuola, which was launched in December 2012. On 29 September 2014, Aunty Moji, as she is fondly called, was among the 305 distinguished Nigerians that was conferred with national honours by President Goodluck Ebele Jonathan of Nigeria. She was appointed as the Champion for National Health Insurance Authority (NHIA) Leadership Development Program on March 22, 2023.

She was made a Member of the Order of the Federal Republic (MFR). She is also an executive director of the International Society of Media in Public Health (ISMP).

Makanjuola was once reported to have used her skillful reporting to correct the perspectives of vaccine cynics in the country

== See also ==
- Nigerian Television Authority
- Oluremi Oyo
- News Agency of Nigeria
