= University of Ibadan =

Public research university in Ibadan, Nigeria

- Former name: University College Ibadan
- Motto: "Recte Sapere Fons" (To think straight is the fount of knowledge).
- Type: Public
- Established: 17 November 1948; 77 years ago
- Chairman: Chief John Odigie Oyegun
- Chancellor: Saad Abubakar, Sultan of Sokoto
- Vice-Chancellor: Kayode Adebowale
- Students: 41,743
- Location: Ibadan, Oyo, Nigeria; 7°26′30″N 3°54′00″E
- Campus: Over 1,030 ha (4.0 sq mi; 2,500 acres); Urban
- Colours: Indigo-blue and gold
- Website: www.ui.edu.ng

The University of Ibadan (UI) is a federal university located in Ibadan, Oyo State, Nigeria. Initially founded as the University College, Ibadan in 1948, it maintained its affiliation with the University of London. In 1962, it became an independent institution, making it the oldest degree-awarding institution in Nigeria. It enrolls about 33,000 students.

== History ==
The opening of Sultan Bello Hall by Alhaji Sir Ahmadu Bello, University College Ibadan, on Second February 1962 (Kenneth Dike to the left, Ahmadu Bello to the right)

The university was established in 1948 as University College Ibadan, a branch of the University of London, which supervised its academic programs and awarded degrees until 1967. The establishment came as a result of a recommendation from the Asquith and the Elliot Commissions on Higher Education in the then-British colonies, that two Universities stemming from the University of London should be set up in Ghana and Nigeria. Before 1948, Yaba College had been founded in 1932 in Yaba, Lagos, as the first tertiary educational institute in Nigeria, focused primarily on providing post-secondary vocational education and teacher training to Africans.

However, the limited aims of Yaba College and clamor by Nigerian nationalists for self-improvement and uninhibited education led to the establishment of University College Ibadan as the first degree-awarding institution in Nigeria in 1948. Staff and students from Yaba Higher College were transferred to Ibadan to form the new University College Ibadan.

Modelled after the British university system, Kenneth Mellanby was appointed in 1947 as its first principal, and he inaugurated the university college on 18 January 1948. The sod of its permanent site was cut on 17 November 1948, a date now known as its Founders' Day. The university's first buildings were designed by eminent modernist architects Maxwell Fry and Jane Drew. Following the tropical modernist style, the 1950s construction comprised administrative blocks, residential colleges and academic facilities.

Following Nigeria's independence in 1960 and the subsequent drive to domesticate several institutions, UCI became an established full-fledged independent university in early 1962 and thus, the name changed to University of Ibadan.

In late 1963, on the university playing fields, with a celebration marked by talking drums, the Rt. Hon. Sir Abubakar Tafawa Balewa, the first Prime Minister of independent Nigeria, became the first Chancellor of this independent university. The first Nigerian vice-chancellor of the university was Kenneth Dike, after whom the university library is named.

University rankings

Global – Overall
- ARWU World: 801-900 (2022)
- CWUR World: 1172 (2022–2023)
- THE World: 801-1000 (2026)
- USNWR Global: 425 (2022)

Regional – Overall
- THE Africa: 6 (2022)
- USNWR Africa: 7 (2022)

National – Overall
- ARWU National: 1 (2022)
- CWUR National: 1 (2022–23)
- THE National: 1 (2022)

National – Life sciences and medicine
- USNWR Medical: 158 (2022)

== Administration ==
The current principal members of the university administration are:

People
Office	Holder
Visitor	Bola Tinubu
Chancellor	Sultan Sa'adu Abubakar, 20th Sultan of Sokoto
Pro-Chancellor & Chairman	Chief John Odigie Oyegun
Vice-Chancellor	Professor Kayode Oyebode Adebowale

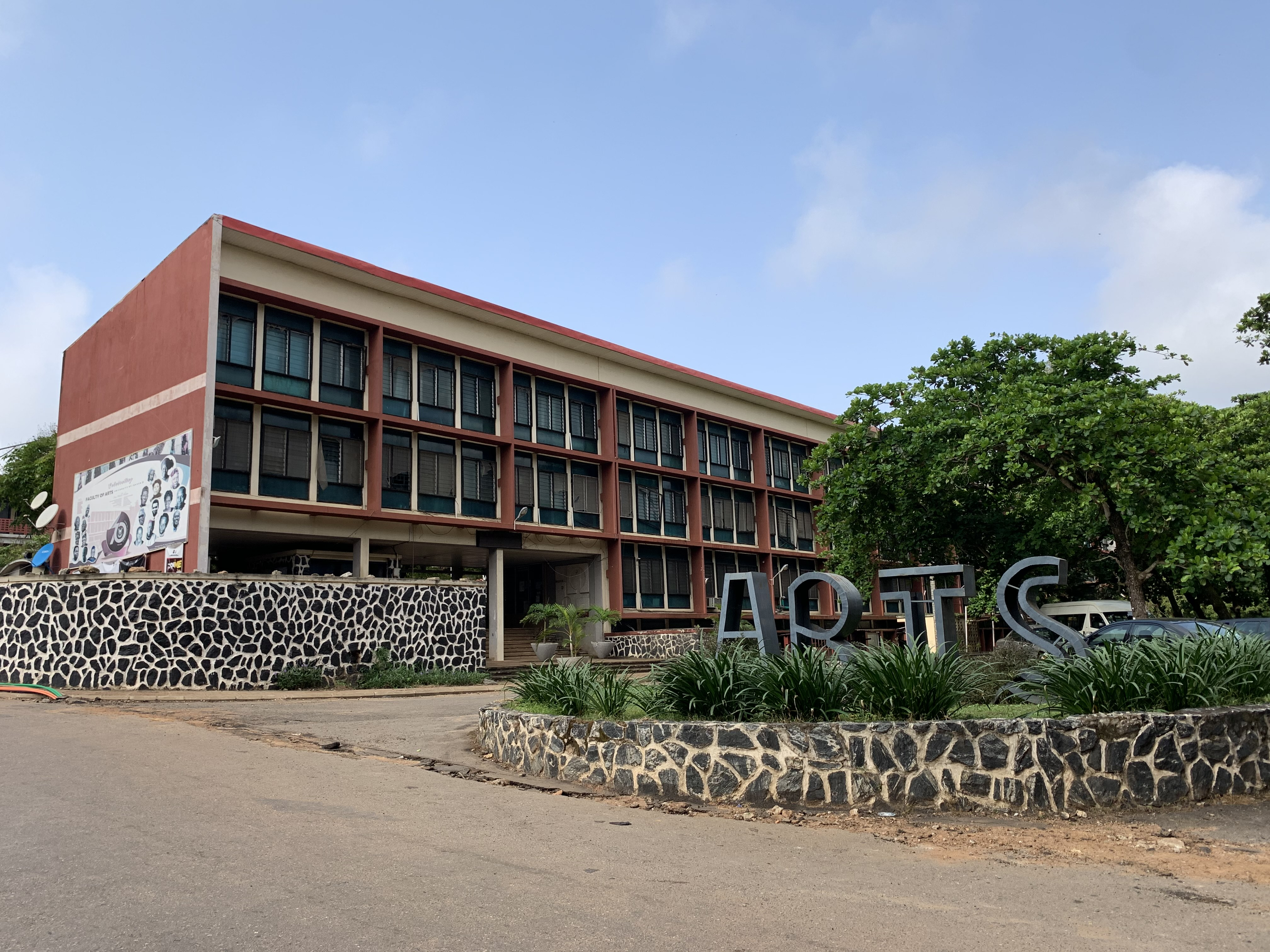
Faculty of Arts

The university is made up of 92 academic departments organized into 17 faculties, namely: Arts, Science, Basic Medical Sciences, Clinical Sciences, Agriculture, the Social Sciences, Education, Veterinary Medicine, Pharmacy, Technology, Law, Public Health, Dentistry, Economics and Management Sciences, all Renewable Natural Resources, Environmental Design and Management, and Multidisciplinary Studies. The Faculties of the Basic Medical Sciences, Clinical Sciences, Public Health and Dentistry are organized as a College of Medicine. The university has other academic units, among which are: Institute of Child Health, Institute of Education, Institute of African Studies, Centre for Child Adolescent and Mental Health, Centre for Entrepreneurship and Innovation (CEI), Institute for Advanced Medical Research and Training (IAMRAT), Institute of Cardiovascular Diseases, Centre for Drug Discovery, Development & Production (CDDDP) and Centre for Control & Prevention of Zoonosis (CCPZ). The recently established Infectious Diseases Institute (IDI), School of Business (UISB) and National Institute for Maternal, Child & Neonatal Health (NIMCNH) have commenced operation.

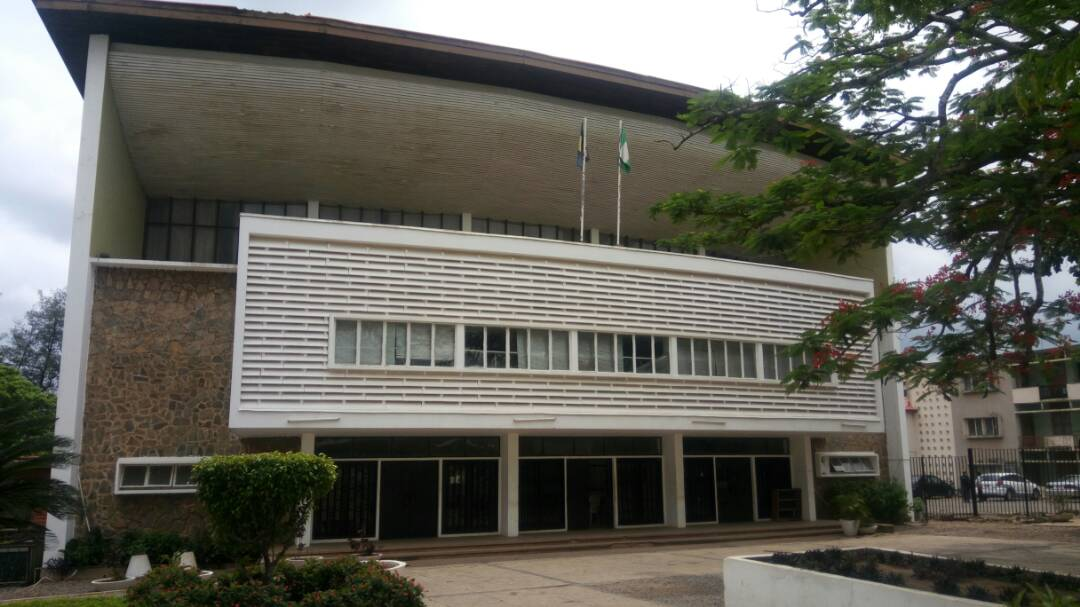
Trenchard Hall

The University of Ibadan has 15 halls of residence that provide accommodation for about 30% of the population of students in the regular studies mode. Some of its popular halls include Lord Tedder Hall, Kenneth Mellanby Hall, Sultan Bello Hall, Nnamdi Azikiwe Hall, Independence Hall, Tafawa Balewa Hall, Kuti Hall, Queen Idia Hall, Queen Elizabeth Hall and the Obafemi Awolowo Hall – which is the largest female hall in West Africa. The university has a total staff strength of 5,339 with 1,212 housing units for both senior and junior staff. The university has residential and sports facilities for staff and students on campus, as well as separate botanical and zoological gardens.

== Facilities ==
=== Library ===
Kenneth Dike Library in 2020

Among the notable structures in the university is the central Kenneth Dike Library (popularly called "KDL" by the students), located just beside the Faculty of Arts. The library, which has a large capacity for students, contains books relating to virtually all fields of knowledge both in and outside the university community.

The library is named after Professor Kenneth Dike, who was the first indigenous Principal and former Vice-Chancellor of the university. It was established out of the desires of the founding fathers and matriarch of the institution to cut a niche for research and sound teaching.

The library contains three million volumes of information and more than 1,550 seats for readers. It is open to all senior staff, students of the institution, and senior staff of the University College Hospital (UCH) Ibadan as well as alumni of the university.

=== Jaja Clinic ===
The Jaja Clinic is the health clinic for students and staff at the university.

== Notable alumni ==
The university has educated many notable alumni, including a Nobel Laureate in Literature, eminent mathematicians, scientists, politicians, lawyers, business icons, philosophers, writers, monarchs, countless technocrats, recipients of the Nigerian National Order of Merit and fellows of the various learned academies.

- Abdulganiyu Abdulrasaq, lawyer, former President of the Nigerian Stock Exchange
- Wole Soyinka, winner of the 1986 Nobel Prize in Literature
- Mufutau Oloyede Abdul-Rahmon, Professor of Arabic and Islamic Studies.
- John Omoniyi Abiri, Nigerian academic
- Sadique Abubakar, former Nigeria Chief of Air Staff
- Chinua Achebe, novelist, author of Things Fall Apart
- J. K. Acquaye, Professor of Haematology, president of the West African College of Physicians (2003–2004)
- Dapo Lam Adesina, Member of House of Representative for Ibadan North East/South Federal Constituency
- Zulu Adigwe, Nollywood actor
- Adiele Afigbo, historian
- Babajide Agunbiade, offshore engineer
- Ayandiji Daniel Aina, former Vice-Chancellor of Caleb University
- J. F. Ade Ajayi, Nigerian historian
- Lola Akande, author and academic
- Wahab Adekola Akande, diplomat
- Claude Ake, Professor of Political Economy, international scholar and social crusader
- Stephen Adebanji Akintoye
- Demas Akpore, politician and academic, president of the college from 1973 to 1978
- Grace Alele-Williams
- Elechi Amadi
- Seth Amoama, Ghanaian Chief of the Defence Staff
- Alexander Animalu, emeritus Professor, former Director National Mathematical Centre, Abuja
- Emeka Anyaoku, former Commonwealth Secretary-General
- Kayode Are, former National Security Adviser and former Director General of the State Security Service
- Ladipo Ayodeji Banjo, former Vice-Chancellor of the University of Ibadan
- Mosun Belo-Olusoga, financial expert
- Senator Robert Ajayi Boroffice
- Vivian E. Browne, visual artist
- J. P. Clark
- Sola David-Borha, Chief Executive (Africa Region) of Standard Bank
- Adebayo Faleti (late), journalist, poet, actor and writer
- Kayode Fayemi, former Governor of Ekiti State, former Min of Solid Minerals
- Olakunle George, academic and professor at Brown University
- Ronke Giwa-Onafuwa, radio presenter and broadcaster
- Chukwuemeka Ike, writer
- Amadi Ikwechegh
- Abiola Irele
- Funmi Iyanda, talk show host, broadcaster, journalist
- Lola Kola, medical sociologist
- William Kumuyi, founder and General Superintendent of Deeper Christian Life Ministry
- Yahaya Kuta, author
- Eyitayo Lambo, Nigerian former Federal Minister of Health
- Mary Lazarus, Nigerian actress.
- Eddie Mbadiwe, Member of the House of Representative
- James Meredith, Civil Rights Movement figure
- Epaphras Denga Ndaitwah
- Jerome Nriagu, Environmental chemist, academic and researcher
- Aniebiet Inyang Ntui, EU Ambassador, University Librarian of University of Calabar and Professor of Library and Information Science.
- Mark Nwagwu, academic and poet
- James Chike Nwankwo, disc jockey and singer
- Adaobi Tricia Nwaubani
- Christopher Okigbo
- Ifeanyi Okowa, Governor of Delta State
- Isidore Okpewho
- Tunji Olaopa, founder and Executive Vice-chairman, ISGPP
- Olufunmilayo Olopade
- Abel Olajide Olorunnisola (MS 1992, PhD 1997), vice-chancellor of Dominion University, Ibadan and Bells University of Technology
- Sophie Oluwole, philosopher
- Miriam Olusanya, first female managing director of GTB
- Akinyinka Omigbodun
- Michael Omolewa, former President of UNESCO General Conference and Ambassador of Nigeria to UNESCO
- Kole Omotosho
- Gamaliel Onosode
- Zakariyau Oseni
- Femi Osofisan, lecturer and playwright known for Women of Owu
- Niyi Osundare
- Nduka Otiono, journalist and author
- Jude Rabo, Vice-Chancellor of Federal University, Wukari
- Ken Saro-Wiwa
- Kashim Shettima, Vice President of Nigeria
- Fisayo Soyombo, investigative journalist
- Martin I. Uhomoibhi
- Farida Waziri
- Folashade Yemi-Esan, head of the civil service of the federation
- Adeola Adenikinju, Professor of Economics

== In popular culture ==
Ebrohimie Road, a street in the University of Ibadan, was the subject of a documentary film, Ebrohimie Road: A Museum of Memory, released in July 2024, written by Nigerian writer and linguist Kola Tubosun. The street features a campus bungalow where Nigerian writer and Nobel Laureate Wole Soyinka lived with his family from around 1967 to around 1972, and which has played a significant role in the history of the country, the university, and the writer himself.

== See also ==
- Diamond FM (Ibadan)
- List of universities in Nigeria

== Sources ==
- van den Berghe, Pierre L. (1973). Power and privilege at an African university. With the assistance of Paul Alabi [and others]. London: Routledge & Kegan Paul. ISBN 0710075855.
- Teferra, Damtew; Altbach, Philip G., eds. (2003). African higher education: An international reference handbook. Bloomington: Indiana University Press. ISBN 978-0-253-34186-0.
