= Nigerian Guild of Editors =

The Nigerian Guild of Editors (NGE) is a network of senior Nigerian journalists. It is an independent, non-profit and non-partisan organisation established to develop human capacity, economic empowerment, protection and welfare amongst its members. The NGE in collaboration with other journalistic bodies across the world, work to preserve the traditions and standard of journalism practice and strict adherence to the Code of Ethics of the profession in Nigeria. NGE advocates for Press Freedom and advancement of democratic practice by engaging with stakeholders saddled with public policy and the welfare of journalists. To help Nigerian media practitioners to uphold the tenet and ethics of journalism, NGE develop, publish and distributes brief editing guide to journalists and organises career linkage programs with local and foreign partners to build professional capacity of its members.

== Brief history ==
The NGE was founded on May 20, 1961, at the old National Press Club located then at Abibu Oki in Lagos state by Alhaji Lateef Jakande (1929-2021) of the Nigerian Tribune was its first founding president and the likes of Babatunde Jose (1925-2008) of the Daily Times as the vice president, Abiodun Aloba (1921-2001) of the Morning Post as the secretary, and Nelson Ottah of the Drum as the assistant secretary. The Guild was established to advance the interests of the profession, deepen editors’ relationships with their various publics ranging from the media itself, to governments, professional and trade associations and other groups that make up civil society.

It was initially named the Guild of Newspaper Editors of Nigeria, designed to serve as an exclusive club of professional news managers where editors as the ultimate gatekeepers on media content could come together seasonally to interrogate issues of professional media practice unfettered by labour matters.

The Guild was also created to provide a rallying forum for the editorial leaders in the Nigerian journalism profession in order have a professional path for the industry's growth. At the time of its inception, Nigeria had just emerged from the cauldron of colonialism and the country needed the support of leaders in the various professions to grow. The NGE was however affected by the coup of 1966. The 1966 crisis degenerated into a civil war that lasted for 30 months with the principle of fair journalism trampled upon by the imperatives of war propaganda. In 1977, the Olusegun Obasanjo's Military Government imposed on the country a Press Council Decree which the media, led by the NGE, rejected. In 1982, the Guild had its conference in Minna, Niger State. In 1982, Alhaji Umaru Dikko, the NPN Minister of Transport tried to take control of the Guild by sponsoring the campaign of Alhaji Ibrahim, the Director General of the NTA who became a registered member of the Guild at that conference, but was resisted by members of the NGE.

The NGE was non-operational for 10 years until it was revived by Mr. Onyema Ugochukwu and a few other editors in 1992. With a lot of support from the Newspaper Proprietors’ Association of Nigeria (NPAN) and civil society groups, the NGE made it through rough years of military dictatorships Nigeria. Since return to democratic rule in 1999, the NGE is still faced with challenges such as seizures of printed newspapers, arrests and detention of journalists and damage of media equipment.

== Membership ==
The Nigerian Guild of Editors is open to editors in the print and electronic media. The leadership of the guild is determined by the members.

== Executives of NGE ==
- Mallam Mustapha Isah who succeeded Funke Egbemode was re-elected has president of the Nigerian Guild of Editors at the 2021 Biennial Convention at Kano He was first elected as president of NGE on Friday, 8 November 2019 at the Editors’ House, Ikeja Lagos, Nigeria.
- Mr. Ali M. Ali (Deputy president of NGE)
- Kila Habibu Nuhu (Vice president North).
- Samuel Egbala (Vice president East)
- Mobolaji Adebiyi (Vice President West)
- Mr. Iyobosa Uwugiaren (General Secretary)
- Austeen Elewodalu (Assistant General Secretary)

== Former Presidents of NGE ==
Funke Egbemoda ( 2016–2019)

Garba-deen Muhammad ( 2015–2016)

Femi Adesina ( 2013–2015)

Gbenga Adefaye (2008-2013)

Baba Dantiye (2003-2008)

Oluremi Oyo (1998-2003)

Garba Shehu (1994-1997)

Biodun Oduwole (1992-1994).
