= Funmi Wakama =

Nigerian journalist

- Born: Olufunmilayo Yetunde Coker; July 1, 1966 (age 59); Lagos, Nigeria
- Education: Moshood Abiola Polytechnic (Mass Communication); Nigeria Institute of Journalism (PGD in Journalism); University of Abuja (M.P.A.)
- Occupations: Journalist, Media Executive
- Employer: Nigerian Television Authority
- Known for: General Manager, NTA Abeokuta

Funmi Wakama née Coker (born 1 July 1966) is a Nigerian journalist.

== Biography ==
Wakama was born in Lagos, Nigeria on 1 July 1966 as Olufunmilayo Yetunde Coker. She started her journalism career as an industrial trainee at the Lagos Television, LTV 8, Lagos in 1985 and moved to the Nigerian Television Authority, Lagos in 1988. She was later appointed as the general manager of Nigeria Television Authority, Abeokuta in 2018.

She studied Mass Communication at the Ogun State Polytechnic, now known as Moshood Abiola Polytechnic, Abeokuta. She has a Post Graduate Diploma Certificate in Journalism from the Nigeria Institute of Journalism, NIJ and a master's degree in Public Administration from the University of Abuja.

She is a former Senior Special Assistant on Media to former Governor Ibikunle Amosun of Ogun State, and the Chief Press Secretary to the Governor. She was the media manager, programme and outreach, International Republican Institute (IRI), USAID programme in Nigeria.
