= Imota =

- Local Council Development Area
- Location in Nigeria
- Coordinates: 6°39′50″N 3°40′12″E
- Country: Nigeria
- State: Lagos
- City: Ikorodu

Area
  - Total: 0.828 km^{2} (0.320 sq mi)

Population
  - Total: 4,240
  - Density: 5,117/km^{2} (13,250/sq mi)
- Time zone: UTC+1 (WAT)

Imota is a district in Ikorodu, Lagos State. Their leaders are called Oba Ranodu of Imota. They are Ijebu-speaking people.

== Etymology ==
The name Imota is coined from "UMU-OTA" meaning "Near the Ota tree".

== History ==
The geographical location known as "Imota" derives its name from a contraction "Imu-Ota" meaning "Near the Ota tree". This as a result of the migration of Ranodu and his people from Ijebu-Ode in search of separate kingdom and they settle near the Ota tree which today's regarded as Imota. Since then, it is forbidden for all inhabitants of Imota to make fire with Ota tree.

The history of Imota shows that the first Ranodu was one of the sons of Obaruwa or Obaruwamoda or Arunwa or Ekewa-olu of Ijebu-ode. His Royal Highness Obaruwa was the tenth Awujale on the throne, at Ijebu- Ode. Other sons of Obaruwa presently reigning as important Obas in their respective domains are Alaiye-ode of Ode-Remo and Ewusi of makun both in Remo division of Ogun State and Osobia of makun-omi in Ijebu waterside local government of Ogun State.

Obaruwa was the first Awujale to introduce royal drum called ‘Gbedu’ which they beat not only during the annual "Osi" festival but also to herald the installation of a new Oba or High chief or during any royal ceremony. Also, it is forbidden during "Osi" festival at Ijebu-ode to sound the royal drum, Gbedu unless it is first beaten at the Obaruwa shrine. Obaruwa also has a distinct characteristic; it is only at his shrine that two rams are sacrificed during Osi festival.

Ranodu, an Oro priest with his friend Senlu Olupe-oku, an Eluku and Agemo chief, his cousin Adebusenjo Orederu, an Ifa priest, slaves Osugbo, Oro Liworu, Oro Logunmogbo, Agemo Jamuse, Agemo Esuwele and Eluku Meden-Meden with Obaship paraphernalia, all left Ijebu-Ode together and started the journey in search of separate kingdom. They firstly settled down at Aiyepe and later directed by the Ifa oracle to move onward.

During the historical journey, Ranodu passed through Oko Mayon where he left Royal signs, they briefly settled at Idado near sagamu, Idado is known today as ‘Agbala Imota’. At Idado, Ranodu paid homage to Oba Akarigbo of Sagamu and seek for his permission to stay, the king checked his loads and saw beaded crown and other royal insignias, he advised ranodu to cross a river called ‘Eruwuru’ and stay there.

Ranodu named Eruwuru as Ajura which is now called Sabo in Sagamu. After their settlement, Ranodu and his people decided to celebrate Agemo festival in which Oba Akarigbo got angry of not been informed about their action and sent two his guards to stop the occasion, the guards were killed and the aftermath results into directive from Ifa Oracle for them to leave the place to Isopo where he and his people had another brief rest, he left behind some members of his entourage migrating southwards.

As the journey continues, Ranodu and his people got to a very high hill which only Senlu Olupe-oku could firstly climb and later called others to join him. They also settled at the hill top for a while, it is in appreciation of Senlu Olupe-oku's courage to climb the hill that Ranodu named the place after him as Odo-Senlu which remains a town till date.

In obedience to Ifá oracle, they continued their journey and got tired along their way, they decided to rest and made a temporary shed with palm tree leaves. They consulted Ifa oracle again and the oracle told to continue their journey and Ranodu named the place Abatiwa which also remains a village till date.

They also pass through Odo-Ayandelu but Ranodu directed some of his slaves led by a slave called Ayan to stay there. They left Odo-Ayandelu to Odo-Onasa where he constructed Igboti Oro and left Oro Liworu for worshipping. The deity is also worshipped till date by the people of Odo-Onosa. After leaving Odo-Onasa, they arrived at Agudugbun and rest there for some months. Ranodu celebrated Oro festival and constructed another Igboti Oro which remains at Agudugbun till date. After some days, Adebusenjo Orederu celebrated Agemo festival in which the slaves were instructed to cut bush so that the Agemo could dance, it was during this celebration that Adebusenjo Orederu's discovered a cross road of foot path in the bush and they left Agudugbun to their final destination.

At Agudugbun, Ranodu observed flames of fire coming from the West, he traced the flames and met two hunters burning fire in their shed, the hunters named Ofirigidi, a man from Oke Orundun and Ojoyeruku, an Eluku worshipper from Ijebu Ode, they welcomed Ranodu and his entourage, Ofirigidi asked Ranodu to open his bag and found kingship properties inside it, they became friends and Ranodu named their meeting point as Opopo. Ofirigidi instructed Ranodu to move a short distance to Ehindi, a compress form of ‘Ehin Odi' and settle there. The Ehindi is where the Idi Ota is located and the name of town is coined. Ranodu instructed Senlu consult Ifa oracle to know if they can stay at the place and Ifa oracle granted their request, this finally marked the birth of Imota town.

Ranodu directed his slaves to cut bushes around Ota tree and built sheds for accommodation. He also directed them to prepare a place for farming so that they can make food for living and the slaves farm both north and south of the land up to a farm called Corn farm which is now called Ago-Mota in Agbowa.

After settling at Imota, Ranodu and his people invited Ofirigidi and Ojoyekuru for a visitation and Ofirigidi suggested that since Ranodu has beaded Oba crown, he should be king of the place but Ranodu objected because of his old age and picked Senlu Olupe-oku to be the king of Imota. Senlu was installed as the first king of town and Ranodu remain the title awarded to all traditional Obas of Imota town (Oba Ranodu of Imota).

After coronation of Oba Senlu Olupe Oku, the first Ranodu of Imota in17th century, Adebusenjo and Ojoyekuru united in worshipping Eluku deity and celebrate the festival together annually. While Ojoyekuru was appointed as Onimale Eluku and Adebusenjo serves as Chief Magodo of Agemo Esuwele.

== Past and present leaders ==
1. Oba Seniu olupe-oku, 1610–1616, he abdicated Ranodu throne and fled to Omu-Ijebu on exile. He lived and died there in 1638.
2. Oba Aladesuwasi, 2nd Senlu, 1640–1665.
3. Oba Lasademo, 1st Lasademo from 1669–1687.
4. Oba Orewaiye Olugayan-Grandson of Ranodu and the 1st indigenous Oba from Imota, 1st Olugayan from 1690–1731
5. Oba Ore Oye, 3rd Senlu from 1734–1770
6. Oba Igara, 4th Senlu from 1772–1793.
7. Oba Ademokun, 2nd Lasademo from 1796–1817
8. Oba Arowolo Arowuyi, 2nd Olugayan from 1820–1854
9. Oba Oyemade, 1st- Oyemade from 1856–1881
  - there was an intertribal war between 1881–1893 that attacked lImota and no reigning Oba then.
10. Oba Okumona Olufoworesete, through the influence of his first wife Princess lge Mayandenu Olugayan, 1st Olufoworesete from 1894–1917
11. Oba Akindehin popularly called Oba Onisuru, 3rd Lasademo from 1917–1920
12. Oba lge Okuseti from lineage of Oba Rowuyo, 3rd Olugayan from 1921–1935
13. Oba Shaibu Awotungase popularly called Oba Daranoye, 4th Olugayan from 1936–1949
14. Oba Albert Adesanya Adejo popularly called Kiniwun Iga, first educated Oba Ranodu of Imota, 2nd Oyemade from 1951–1981
15. Oba Lawrence Adebola Oredoyin, second educated Oba Ranodu of Imota, 5th Senlu from 1981–1993.
16. Oba Mudasiru Ajibade Bakare Agoro, third educated Oba Ranodu of Imota, 2nd Olufoweresete from 1993 to date.

== Ruling families ==
1. Senlu Ruling House
2. Olugayan Ruling House
3. Lasademo Ruling House
4. Oyemade Ruling House

== Traditional chieftaincy ==
1. Olisa
2. Ayangade
3. Aro
4. Alagbo Jamuse
5. Ayangbuwa
6. Balogun
7. Alase Oluweri
8. Olootu Erelu
9. Olumale Eluku
10. Lojona Jamuse
11. Busenowo
12. Adegoruwa
13. Lojona Jamuse
14. Olootu omoba
15. Losi
16. Oluwo
17. Araba
18. Aare
19. Ayanolu
20. Adeyoruwa
21. Apena Osugbo
22. Adebusenjo
23. Olootu Balufon
24. Lapeni Awo
25. Alase Jamuse
26. Magodo Esuwele
27. Muleoruwa
28. Gusenlomo
29. Alagbo Orisa nla
30. Eluku Asa
31. Adegorusen
32. Ogbeni-Odi
33. Egbo
34. Apena
35. Raselu
36. Alakan
37. Odofin
38. Legunsen
39. Ogbodo
40. Fadegbuwa
41. Jomu
42. Ogbeni Oja
43. Iyalode
44. Iyalaje
45. Gbasemo
46. Otunba
47. Eleku Asa
48. Ladugba
49. Agoro
50. Jagun
51. Supori
52. Senlu
53. Oloolu
54. Oluomo

== Location and political structure ==
Imota town is sandwiched by latitude 6°39′50″N and it straddles longitudes of 3°40′12″E. It is bounded in the North by Agbowa-Ikosi town, in the South by Isiu town, in the East by Igbokuta town, while in the West by Apeje- Remo town with considerable land mass of approximately 502 square kilometres.

Imota was initially placed in Ikosi district council under Epe division. The town is divided into four quarters: Itun-Opopo, Itun-Onabu, Itun- Maja, and Atere. Each quarter has its own political representative called councillors. The first sets of councillors from Imota were illiterate; they include Pa. Ogunnoiki, Pa. Alaga, Pa. Oyinbo and Pa. Agbonmagbe. They were chosen based on their activeness and held in high esteem that their decisions remain final.

In practicing democracy in the town, the Osugbo's owned the judicial power, they check on the excesses of the king, while the king exercises both executive and legislative functions.

The creation of Lagos State in 1967 created five main divisions, namely Lagos Colony, Badagry, Epe, Ikeja and Ikorodu. This bring about the delimitation of Ikorodu division into two constituencies with Ikorodu central, Ikorodu north and Ikorodu west as constituency I and Imota, Igbogbo, Ijede communities as constituency II.

The Local Government reform of 1976 divided Lagos State into eight Local Government Areas in which Ikorodu Local Government was created. The civil rule of 1979 under Lateef Jakande also sub-divided the state into twenty-three Local Government Areas and defunct Irepodun Local Government was carved out of Ikorodu Local Government but the experience of military incursion into Nigeria polity distorted second republic and led to the cancellation of Irepodun Local Government and return Local Governments in the state to initial eight.

The establishment of Irepodun local government created an accord and consensus agreement between the three major towns in Ikorodu constituency II that ‘the post of the honourable member at the Lagos State House of Assembly of the constituency, the post of Chairman of Irepodun Local Government and the seat of headquarter of the Local Government will be shared among the three towns in the constituency’.

Though, the agreement was unwritten because in those days, the majority of the political leaders in these towns cannot read and write but believe in mutual consent. Yet, the formation witnessed the presentation of Hon. Fola Oredoyin as the first representative of the constituency at Lagos State House of Assembly (1979-1983). Fola Oredoyin emerged as the Deputy Speaker of the State House of Assembly during the Second Republic, Alhaji S.O Amusa-Olorunishola further served as the first and the only executive chairman of Irepodun local government and the seat of the headquarters of Irepodun local government was at Ewu-elepe, Igbogbo town.

With the defunct Irepodun local government, the three towns in the constituency were left with the post of the honourable member at Lagos State House of Assembly which was rotationally shared based on the existing agreement. It produced Hon. M.K Sanni from Imota as elected member of Lagos State House of Assembly to complete the second tenure of Hon. Fola Oredoyin.

The Nigeria's third and fourth republic also produced Hon. Adefarasin Saheed Hassan from Ijede as member of Lagos State House of Assembly (1999-2007), and Late (Hon.) Rotimi Sotomiwa from Igbogbo in 2007-2010, his untimely death terminated is tenure and a bye-election usher in a People's Democratic Party (PDP) candidate, Hon. Gbenga Oshin to complete his tenure (2010-2011), Hon. Akinsola Adebimpe from Igbogbo/Bayeku LCDA was also elected to complete the second term (2011-2015) and the bait of power was transfer back to Imota in 2015 and Hon. Nurudeen Saka-Solaja was elected to represent the constituency at Lagos State House of Assembly

The creation of additional thirty-seven Local Council Development Areas to the existing twenty Local Government Areas in Lagos State by Bola Ahmed Tinubu in 2003 made Imota and other communities in Ikorodu constituency II an autonomous government with four political wards.
