= Culture of Lagos =

Overview of culture in Lagos, Nigeria

Lagos the largest city in Nigeria, and one of the most populous urban areas in Africa, with a population estimate of over 16 million, is a thriving and varied hub of culture, arts, and economic activity. A fusion of diverse traditions, shaped by its indigenous Yoruba heritage, colonial legacy, and modern cosmopolitanism. The city is renowned for its dynamic vitality, serving as a major cultural and creative epicenter in Africa. It is central to the continent's booming film industry; Nollywood, ranked second largest films industry globally in terms of output, and is Nigeria hotspot for Hip-hop, a genre that has produced famous stars who have gained international recognition. Lagos holds a special place in the history of Afrobeat, being home to legends such as Fela Kútì recognised as the innovator of Afrobeat, whose politically charged music revolutionised African soundscapes, and King Sunny Ade, the maestro of juju music whose musical career began in Lagos.

Lagos is home to numerous galleries, theaters, and music venues. Public celebration and festival such as the Eyo festival; a centuries-old cultural procession and modern celebrations like Lagos Music Festival, Lagos Book and Art Festival, Lagos Black Heritage Festival, contribute to its cultural reputation which draws both local and international audiences. Its busy streets, competed markets, and iconic landmarks like the National Museum and Onikan cultural district are complemented by its growing cultural infrastructure.

== Lagos State Ministry of Tourism, Arts and Culture ==
Lagos State Ministry of Tourism, Arts and Culture Initially established as a department under the Ministry of Home Affairs has evolved significantly since its inception in 1995, becoming a crucial component of the state's economy and cultural identity. Following the rebranding as the Ministry of Tourism, Arts and Culture in 2015 the ministry has expanded its mandate to include the promotion of cultural heritage, tourism infrastructure, and arts. A bedrock of its strategy is the Lagos Cultural Mission Initiative, designed to showcase Lagos' rich cultural heritage on the global stage, attract international partnerships, and drive year-round tourism. with significant investments in developing local tourism sites, and projects like Film Villages and Musical Concert Arenas, to enhance domestic tourism and reduce the outflow of Nigerians traveling abroad for recreation. Tourism now contributes to Lagos State's Gross Domestic Product (GDP), accounting for 10% of the state's economy as at 2024.

== Arts ==
=== Music ===
Lagos is a synergy of music and social dynamics often referred to as Nigeria's entertainment hub, the city has played a central role in shaping and promoting African music on a global scale. In pre-colonial times, music in Lagos was deeply intertwined with religious, social, and political life. Indigenous musical styles like the royal Igbe music, Korogun-Olosa drum music, and Karajagba music of the Idejo chiefs played key roles in ceremonial and ritual contexts. These traditions showcased rhythmic complexity, vocal chants, and theatrical performances, often tied to festivals like the Eyo festival. The arrival of European missionaries and freed slaves in the 19th century introduced Western musical traditions to Lagos. Missionary schools promoted Western classical music, emphasizing hymns, choir training, and the use of the harmonium. Musical pioneers like Canon J.J. Ransome Kuti and Emmanuel Sowande introduced indigenous elements into church music paving the way for modern Nigerian art music.

The amalgamation of Nigeria in 1914 marked a period of significant cultural nationalism, and Lagos became a center for musical experimentation. Genres like waka, Asiko, sakara and palm-wine music flourished, blending indigenous sounds with Western instruments. This genre laid the foundation for highlife and juju music, . Artists like Bobby Benson, Victor Olaiya, Ebenezer Obey, and King Sunny Ade contributed to the popularity of these styles. In the 1970s and 1980s, Lagos became the cradle of Afrobeat, popularised by Fela Anikulapo Kuti and Tony Allen. Lagos with its political unrest and vibrant nightlife, provided the perfect backdrop for the genre's emergence. Combining traditional African rhythm with funk and Jazz, serving as a vehicle for political critique against corruption and authoritarianism.

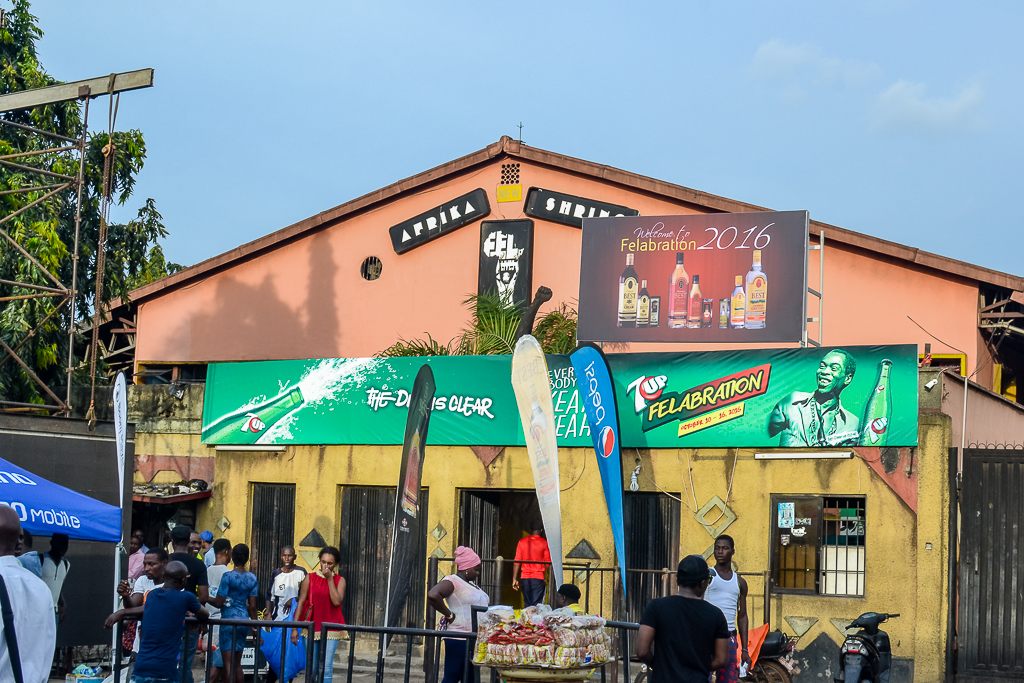
New Afrika Shrine, Lagos

In 1977, Lagos hosted the Second World Festival of Black Arts and Culture (FESTAC '77), a monumental event that attracted over 16,000 participants from 56 African nations and the African diaspora. This festival showcased Lagos's role as a cultural beacon, with music at its core, and solidified its reputation as a global stage for African unity and creativity. Lagos's urban spaces have also been instrumental in shaping its music scene. Iconic venues such as the New Afrika Shrine, Empire Hotel, Cool Cats Inn, Central Cinema, and Caban Bamboo nightclub became the breeding grounds for musical innovation, from Afrobeat to highlife.

The 1980s and 1990s marked a transformative period characterised by the rise of digital music, the spread of reggae, and the birth of Nigerian hip-hop. In 2004, a new era of individualism emerged moving away from the dominance of boy bands and collaborative groups. The era witnessed the emergence of artists like Timaya, 2 Face, D’Banj, ELDee, Don Jazzy, K-Solo, and 9ice.

In contemporary times, Lagos continues to produce globally renowned artists like Wizkid, Burna Boy, Tiwa Savage, Davido and Olamide. The city's landscapes, from iconic landmarks to bustling streets, frequently feature in music videos. Tracks like Wizkid's "Ojuelegba" and Olamide's "I Love Lagos" Kizz Daniel’s "Eko," Brymo’s "1 Pound song" Banky W "Ebute Meta" captures the city's essence.The city remains a dynamic hub where sound and space intersect, and serves as the focal point for the rapidly growing Nigerian entertainment sector.

=== Visual arts ===
The foundation of Lagos's art world as an organised social system for creating, distributing, interpreting, and appreciating art can be traced back to the years leading up to Nigerian independence in 1960. However, it was not until the early 21st century that a crucial element of this system; the art market fully emerged in Lagos. Significant historical milestones, such as FESTAC 77, and the establishment of early art galleries like Mbari Mbayo and Didi Museum in the 1960s and 70s. laid the foundation for an evolving art ecosystem that has expanded rapidly in recent decades. Artists like Aina Onabolu, known as the father of modern Nigerian art, and the first Western-trained Nigerian artist laid the foundation for art education and visual arts practice in Lagos during the early 20th century. His work marked the beginning of a significant artistic movement influenced by European traditions, particularly naturalistic styles introduced during the colonial period. In 1924, his painting, "The Nigerian Weaver", was selected for an exhibition in London to celebrate British empire day, marking the first visual art competition in Nigeria. The following year, Onabolu organised a groundbreaking exhibition at Glover Memorial Hall in Lagos, where he showcased his works alongside those of his students. This became the first major recorded display of modern art in Nigeria, laying the foundation for contemporary artistic practices.

Between 1970 and 1999, Lagos became a focal point for artists, providing diverse themes for artistic expression. Landscape painters like, Kolade Oshinowo, and Abayomi Barber Who infused their landscape paintings with sociopolitical themes and personal expression. The socio-economic growth of Lagos in the 1970s and 1980s, spurred by the oil boom, further fueled artistic activities, with private galleries and art exhibitions flourishing. This period saw the rise of art collectors who perceived art as a status symbol, leading to a growing market for landscape paintings. Art organizations such as the Visual Arts Society of Nigeria (VASON) and institutions like Yaba College of Technology contributed to the professional training and support of artists, ensuring a steady inflow of talent into the Lagos art scene.

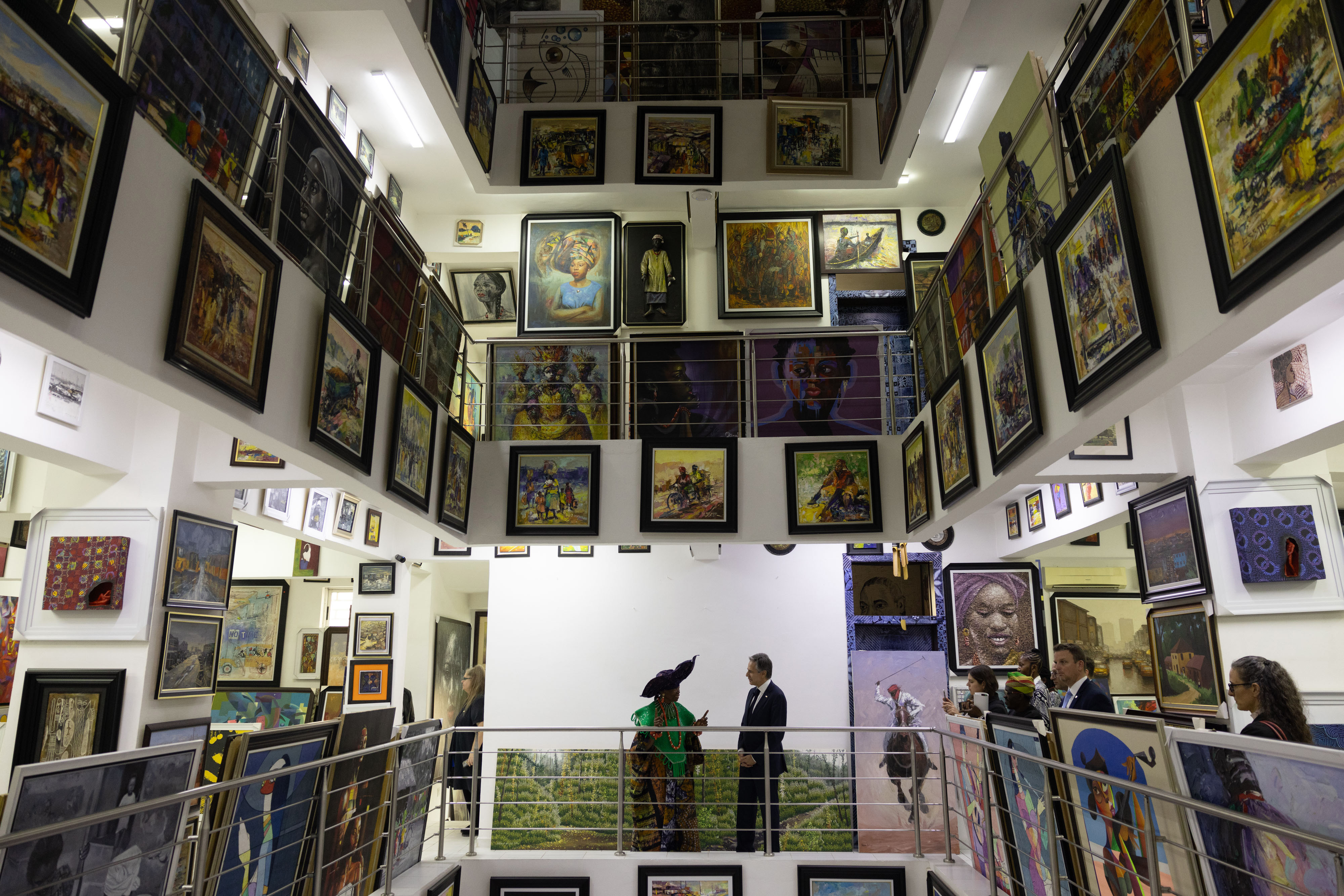
Nike Art Gallery, Lagos Nigeria.

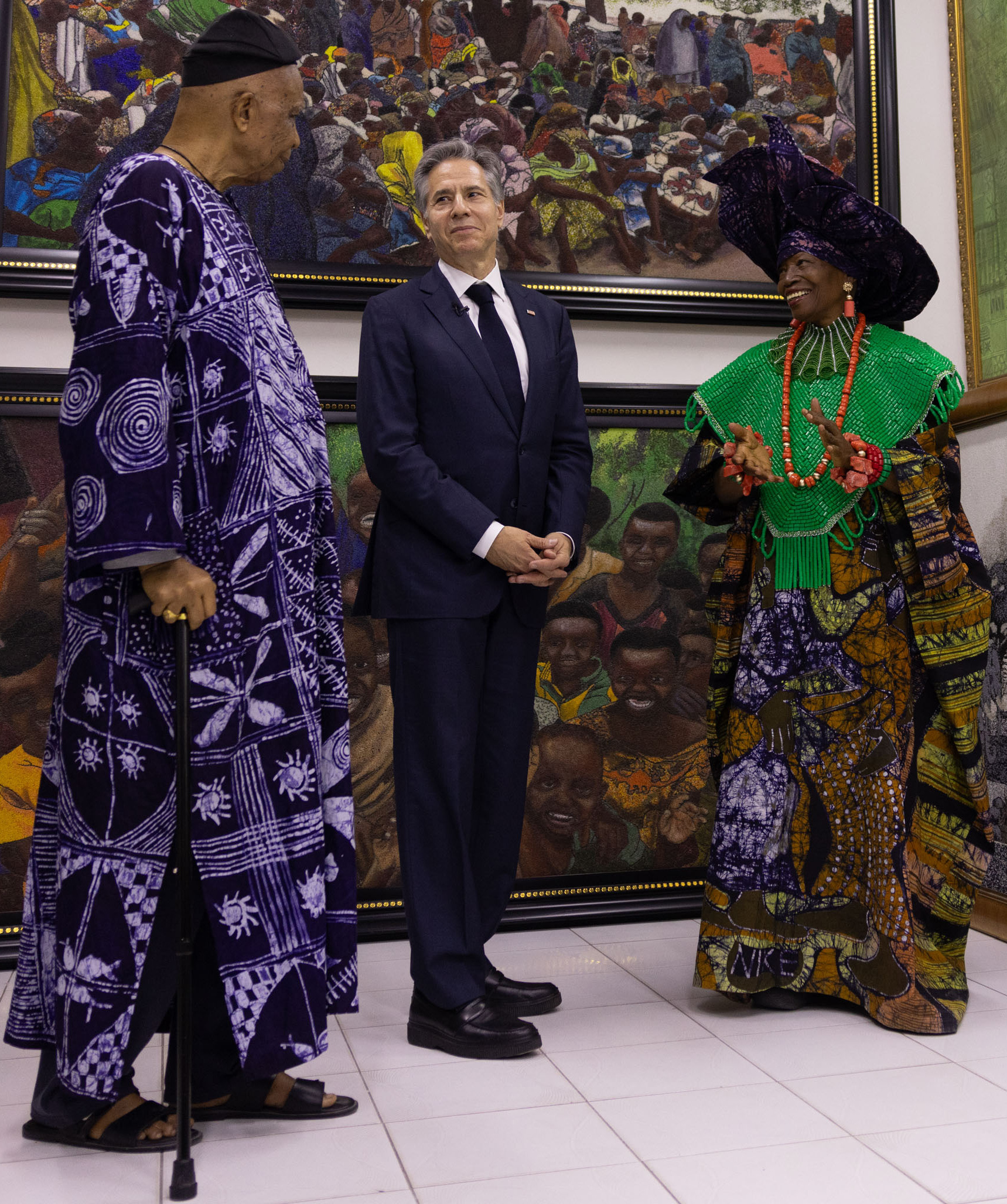
U.S. Secretary of State Antony Blinken at Nike Art Gallery in 2024

In the early 2000s, Lagos began to witness a surge in contemporary art initiatives. Art fairs like ART X Lagos, established in 2016, and the Lagos photo Festival, launched in 2010, became platforms for showcasing modern African art to international audiences. Art galleries, such as Nike Art Gallery, Terra Kulture and Rele Art Gallery, have supported local and international artists, while auctions by Arthouse Contemporary have significantly contributed to the secondary art market, enabling the financial growth of the industry. Notable artists like Jelili Atiku and Bright Ugochukwu Eke have brought critical acclaim to Lagos's art scene through experimental works in performance and installation art, tackling social, environmental, and cultural issues. Institutions like the Centre for Contemporary Art (CCA) have fostered dialogue and innovation, providing space for exhibitions, discussions, and critical engagement with global artistic practices.

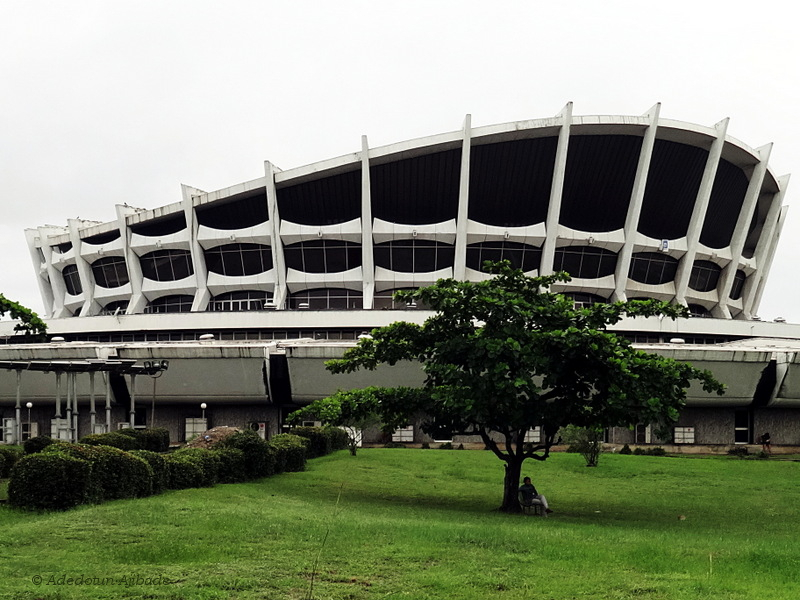
National arts theatre Lagos, Nigeria.

Lagos blend of elegance and chaos also provides a plethora of themes that inspire local artists, who are increasingly focusing on fine arts such as painting and sculpture. While applied arts like graphics and textiles are often viewed as lesser forms due to their utilitarian nature, fine arts are celebrated for their originality and aesthetic value. In recent years, there has been a notable increase in patronage of the arts in Lagos, driven by substantial investments in creative works. This patronage comes from various sources, including individuals, private organizations, and public institutions. Major outlets for art patronage include national agencies like the National Gallery of Modern Art, Lagos, as well as private galleries and corporate sponsors.

=== Public arts ===
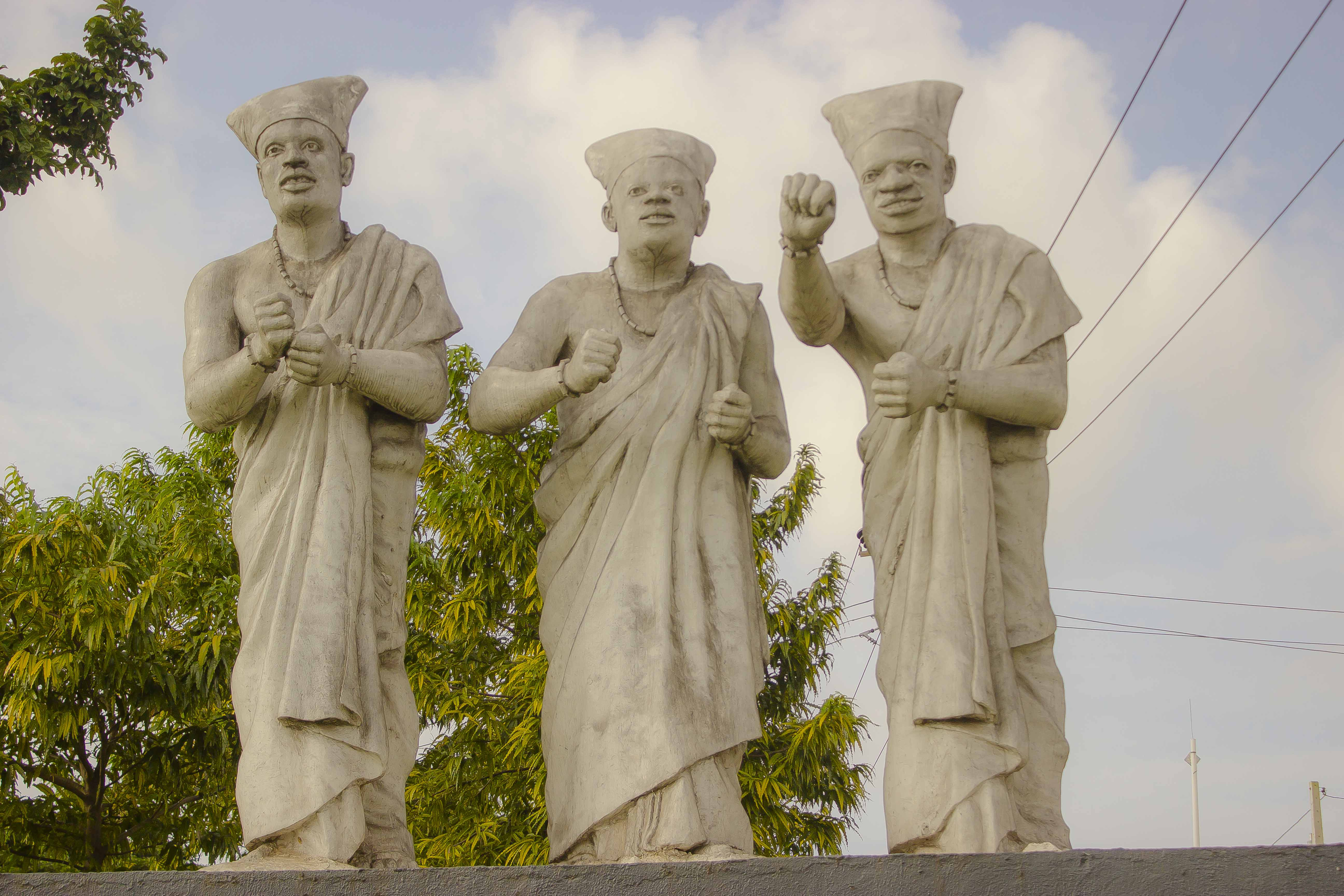
Welcome to Lagos statue

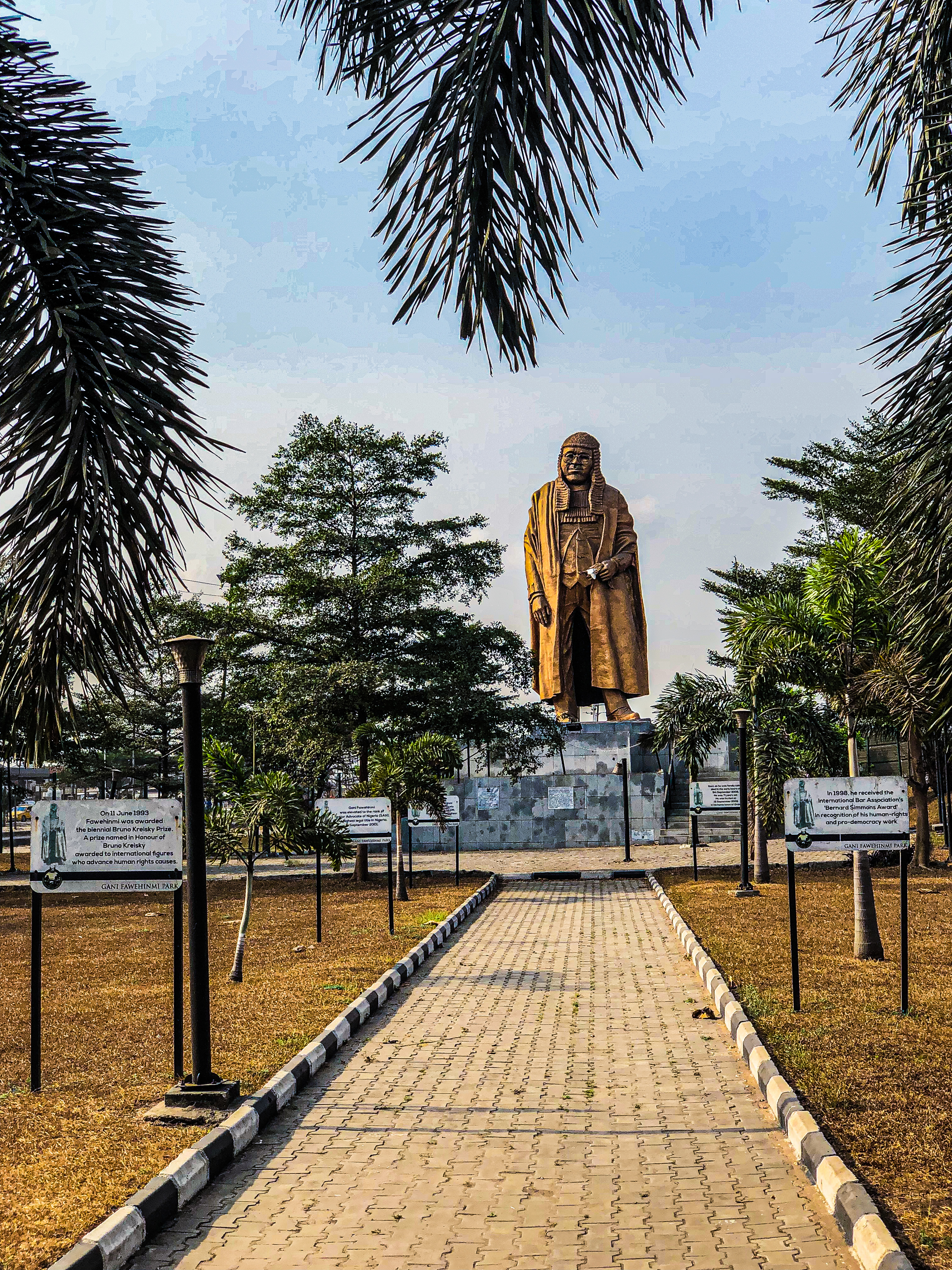
Gani Fawehinmi statue, at the centre of Gani Fawehinmi Park in Lagos.

Lagos has a rich tradition of public art that reflects its cultural, historical, and modern influences. sculptures, murals, and graphic installations shapes its urban fabric, providing an avenue for cultural expression. These works are often commissioned by the state or private entities to commemorate key figures, embody cultural ideologies, or beautify public spaces.One of the earliest documented public art in Lagos is the Cenotaph of the Unknown Soldier Idumota, installed in 1948 to honor fallen soldiers of World War I and World War II originally at Idumota but later relocated to Dodan Barracks .This piece set the stage for future installations. Over time, sculptures like the Eyo Masquerade (1987), Welcome to Lagos (statue) of the Three White Cap Chiefs at the Lagos-Ibadan toll gate, welcoming visitors with traditional Yoruba greetings, and the iconic 14 ft bronze sculpture of Sango by Ben Enwonwu (1964) became landmarks, celebrating figures of historical and cultural significance. The 2017 Lagos at 50 initiative marked a significant push for public art, with over twenty sculptures commissioned across the state. Notable works include the Gani Fawehinmi Park.

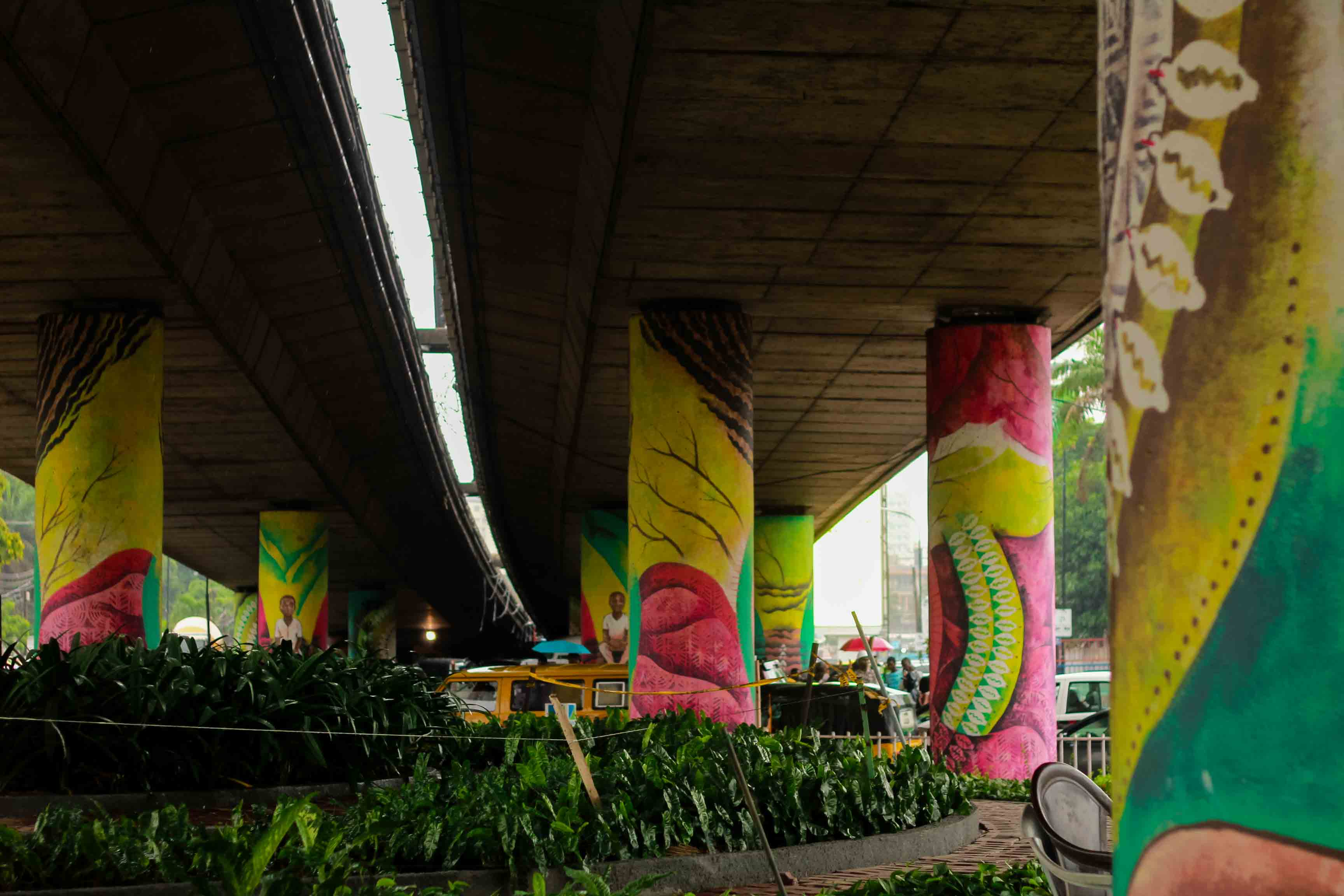
Falomo Underbridge Mural

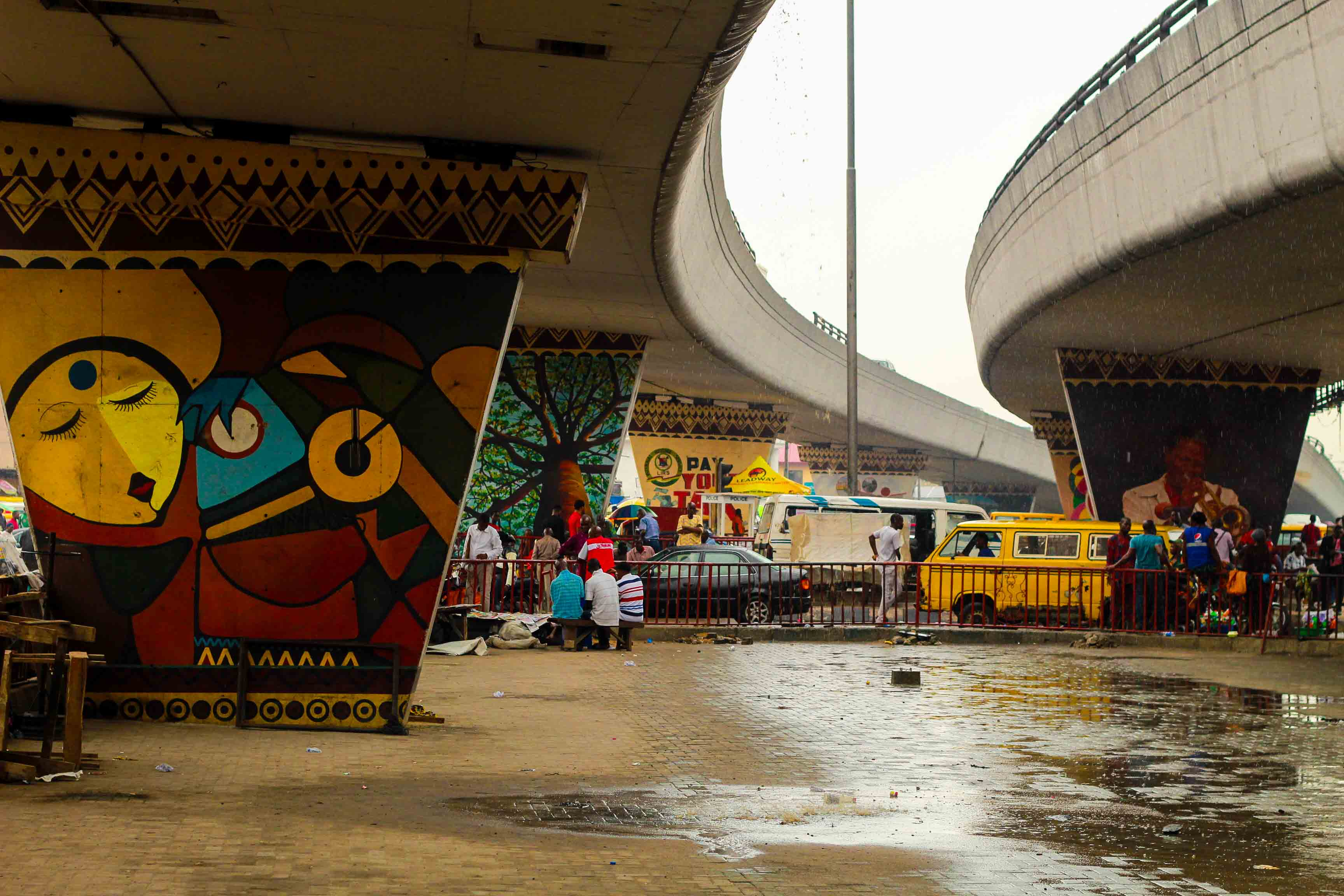
Ojuelegba Underbridge Mural

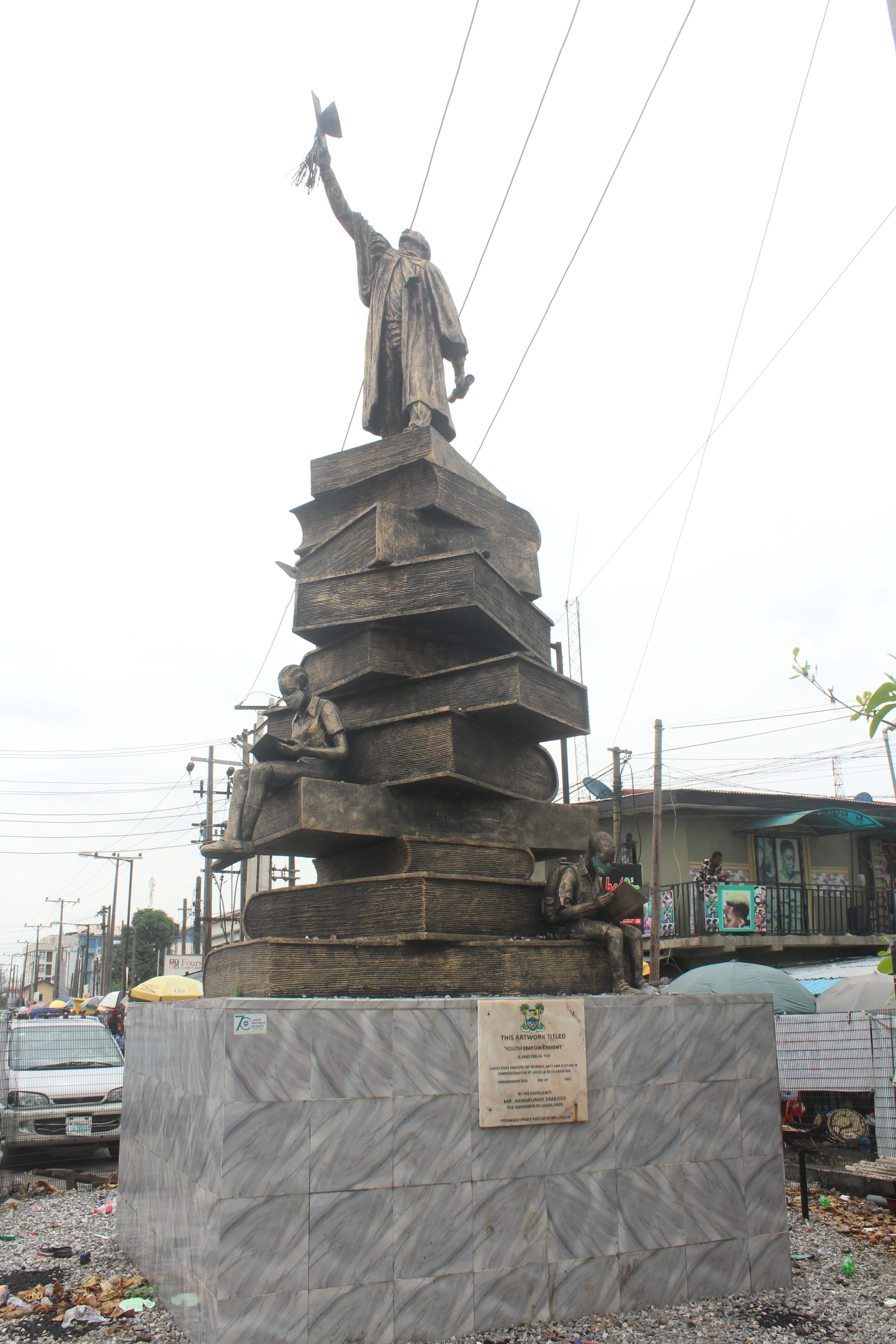
Youth Empowerment Sculpture at Yaba, Lagos.

Lagos public art are showcased through murals and paintings at Ojuelegba under bridge, Falomo under bridge, and installations at the Ikeja Bus Terminal, this work reflect historical themes, notable personalities, and social commentary which contribute to the city's cultural scenery. Roundabouts and public spaces feature horticultural arrangements and sculptures like Youth Empowerment statue at Yaba roundabout, which symbolises the importance of education. Other notable monuments include the Herbert Macaulay statue at Sabo, which celebrates the nationalist's contributions to Nigeria's independence, and Obafemi Awolowo's statue in Ikeja, which celebrates his advocacy for education and egalitarianism. Modern public art in Lagos also addresses contemporary struggles. The Kudirat Abiola Monument at Seven-Up Junction, created by Kenny Adamson, powerfully depicts the political oppression of the 1990s and the triumph of democracy. Similarly, the “Wings of Liberty fountain at Tinubu Square commemorates Nigeria's independence.

== Films ==
Lagos has been a key player in the Nigerian entertainment industry, home to Nollywood—the world's second-largest film industry by production volume. In recent years, efforts have been made to formalise and enhance Lagos's role in global cinema, epitomised by the establishment of the Lagos Film City which aims to elevate Nollywood's status, by providing a global stage for the continent's untold stories and creative excellence, blending the best of local and global talents to create a sustainable and innovative entertainment hub.

=== Cinema ===
The film and cinema industry in Lagos, Nigeria, has played a vital role in shaping the cultural and social life of the city, while also contributing significantly to its economy. The history of cinema in Lagos dates back to 1903 when the first film was screened at Glover Memorial Hall. During the colonial era, cinema gained prominence as a form of entertainment and education, with documentary films being used by the colonial government for propaganda and public enlightenment. By the 1930s and 1940s, commercial cinema houses such as Rex, Regal, and Capitol cinemas had emerged, catering to the city's growing population of elites and colonial officials. These cinemas showcased both foreign and locally produced films, and they quickly became a hub for relaxation and cultural exchange.

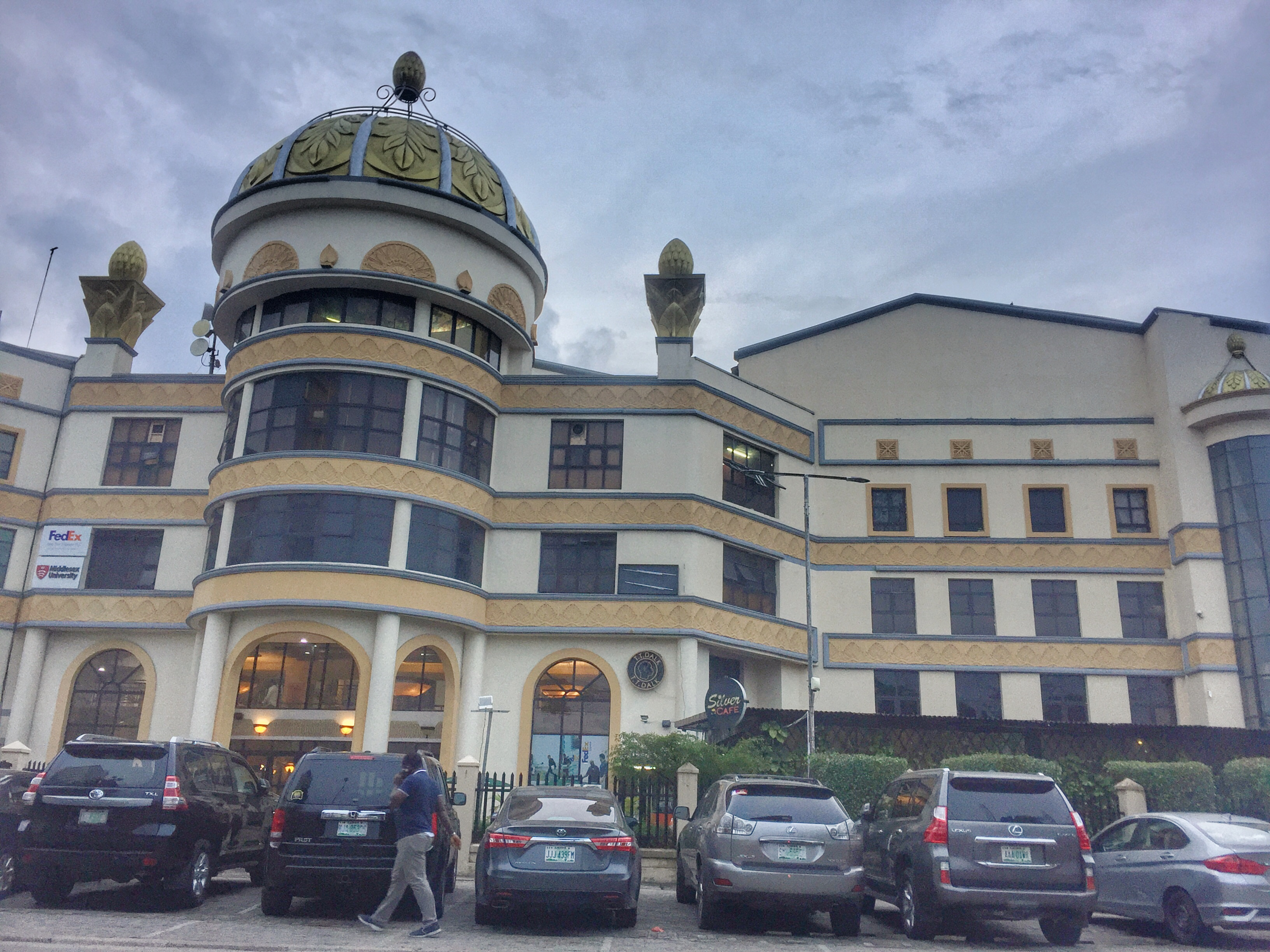
Silverbird Cinema building, Lagos.

After Nigeria's independence in 1960, the cinema business expanded rapidly in Lagos, with the number of cinema houses doubling by the mid-1970s. The 1970s also marked a shift towards the production of indigenous films, with filmmakers such as Ola Balogun and Hubert Ogunde creating works that reflected Nigerian cultural heritage. These films gained immense popularity, contributing to the growth of a vibrant cinema culture in Lagos. However, by the 1980s, the cinema industry in Lagos faced significant challenges. The introduction of television and the widespread availability of video home systems (VHS) led to a decline in cinema attendance, as audiences opted for the convenience of home entertainment. Economic hardships and the Structural Adjustment Program (SAP) of the mid-1980s further eroded the middle class, which had been a key patronage group for cinemas. Many iconic cinema houses closed down during this period, with their spaces repurposed for other uses. The early 2000s saw a resurgence in Lagos's cinema culture, spurred by the establishment of modern cinema complexes such as Silverbird Cinemas.These venues offer state-of-the-art facilities and cater to diverse audiences with a mix of Hollywood blockbusters, Nollywood films, and international productions.

== Cultural Diversity ==
=== Demographics ===
Lagos city is on the Atlantic seaboard of West Africa. Its population has grown rapidly since independence in 1960, increasing from an estimated 763,000 to approximately over 16 million today. This growth is fueled by economic migration and internal displacement due to conflicts in northern Nigeria and neighboring regions. Despite the federal government moving the capital to Abuja in 1991, Lagos continues to be Nigeria's socio-economic epicenter. Over 40% of Lagos’ population, around 6 million people, are under the age of 25, making it a young city. However, the population density is striking, with averages of 4,713 individuals per square kilometer, which rise to as much as 12,000 in low-income areas. Lagos State, the smallest in Nigeria with a landmass of 3,345 square kilometers, is characterized by its high urbanization rate, which has expanded at 2.6% annually since 2000. The city is a patchwork of formal urban spaces and informal settlements, with over 60% of residents living in informal communities such as Makoko, home to an estimated 300,000 people. Economically, Lagos is Nigeria's powerhouse, driven by its financial sector, manufacturing, and emerging industries like fintech.

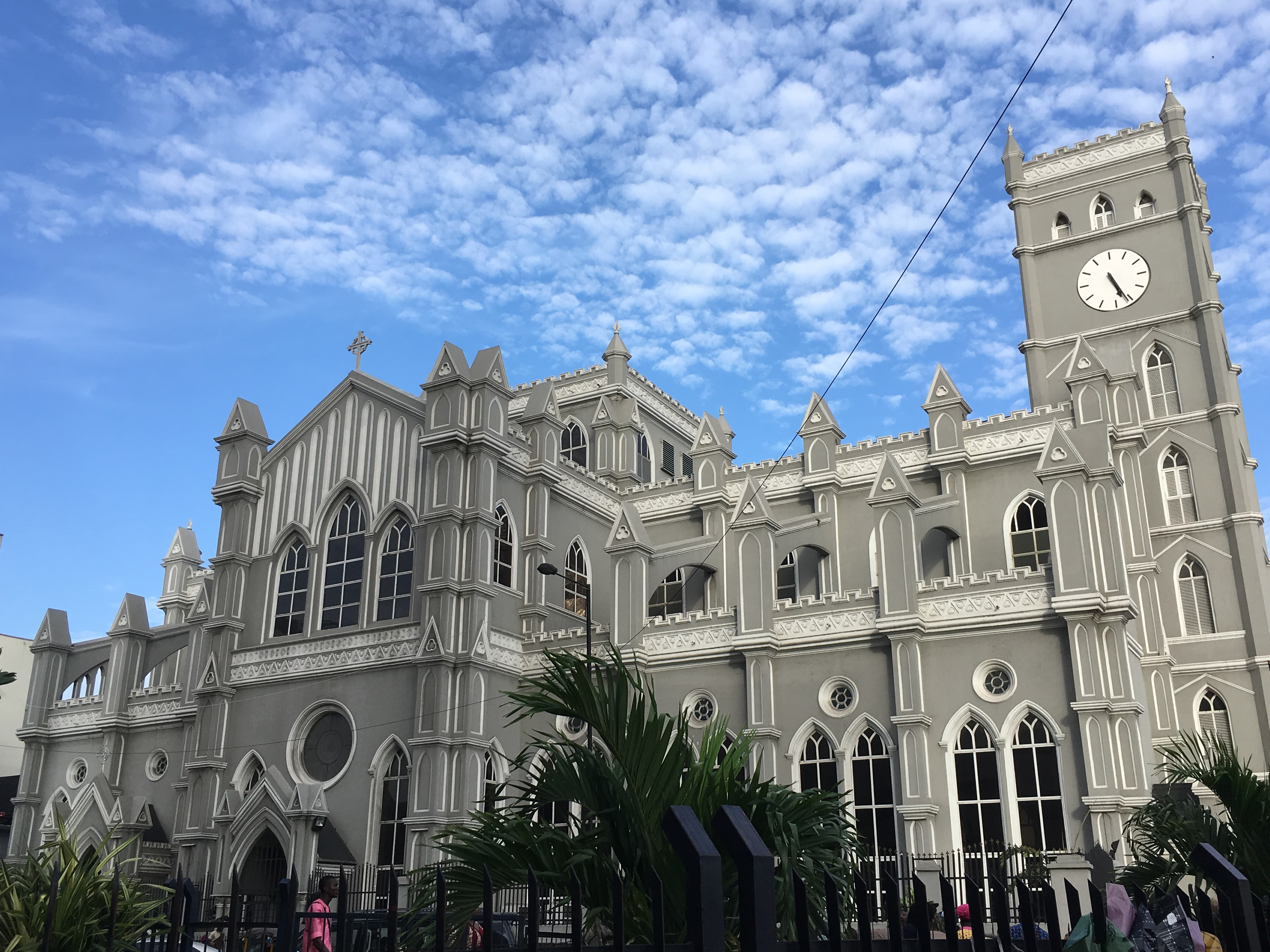
Cathedral Church of Christ, Marina, Lagos.

Lagos is known for its openness and cultural diversity. This diversity stems from a mix of indigenous Yoruba culture and influences from other ethnic groups within Nigeria and beyond. Lagos serves as a center for education and culture in Sub-Saharan Africa. It is also a city of religious harmony, with significant Muslim, Christian and Traditional African religions populations coexisting. A notable religious monument in Lagos is the Cathedral Church of Christ, Lagos established in 1869.

Lagos being home to the Awori subgroup of Yoruba of West Africa.Yoruba, form the largest groups in Lagos, alongside Igbo, Hausa and residents from other African nations and across the globe. This multicultural character is reflected in the city's cuisine, scene, music, art, fashion, museums, galleries, while its culinary landscape is equally diverse. From jollof rice, amala and ewedu, ofada rice, spicy suya to roasted plantains (bole) and eba, Lagos has a mix of local and international dishes.

=== Festivals ===
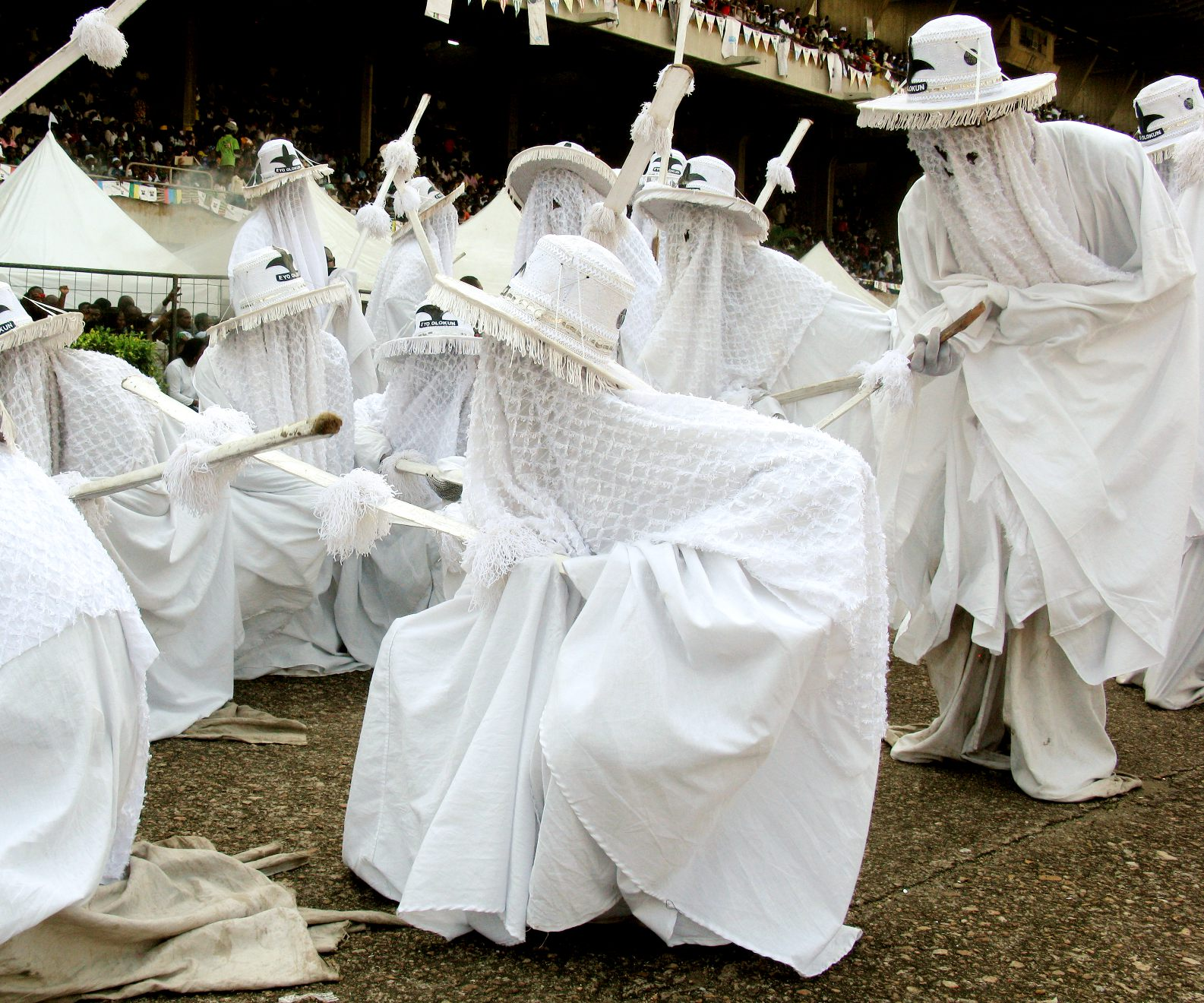
Eyo masquerade during Eyo festival

Lagos with its diverse ethics communities and venues has quite a large number of festivals and carnivals. Eyo festival, is one of the cultural festivals held on Lagos Island, Nigeria. Celebrated with the participation of Eyo masquerades dressed in striking white costumes and colourful hats, the festival honours notable individuals, including deceased monarchs and distinguished Lagosians. Central to the festival are the symbolic wooden staffs (Opambata) carried by the masquerades and the five distinct Eyo groups—Adimu, Alaketepupa, Oniko, Ologede, and Agere.

The Gẹlẹdẹ festival is another Yoruba celebration, which is prominent in Lagos. It pays homage to the "Great Mother" (Iya Nla) and the Powerful Mothers, deities believed to influence fertility and community welfare. Participants wear elaborate costumes with intricately carved headdresses depicting cultural symbols. The festival includes dance, music, and storytelling, often accompanied by the traditional gon-gon drum.

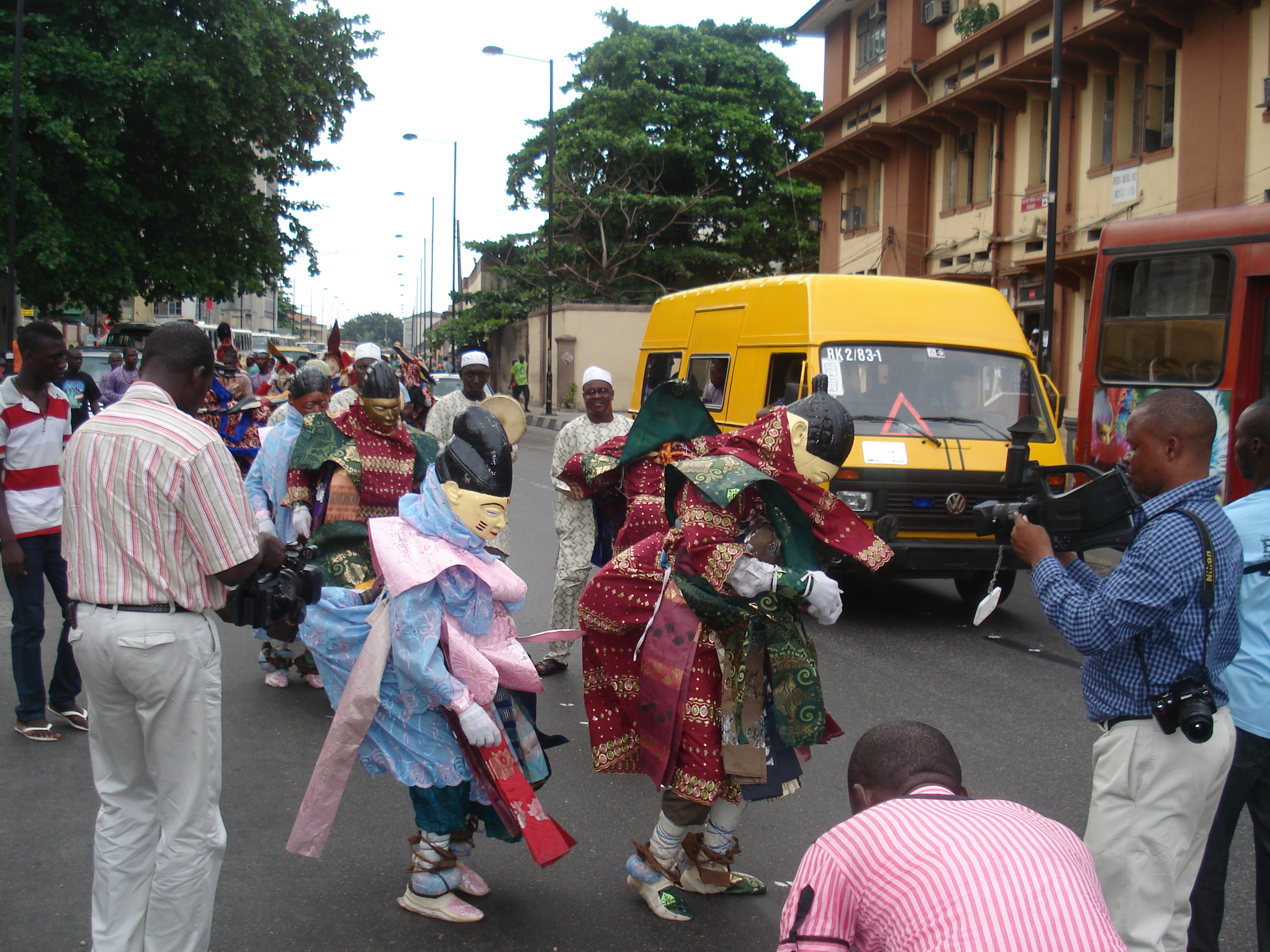
Lagos Black Heritage Festival Parade

One of the modern festivals observed in the city is the Lagos Black Heritage Festival, inaugurated in 2009, a three-week celebration of Lagos’ rich cultural heritage, featuring the Lagos Water Regatta, international jazz performances, drama, art exhibitions, and a vibrant carnival. It attracts both local and international tourists, showcasing Lagos' cultural and economic potential.

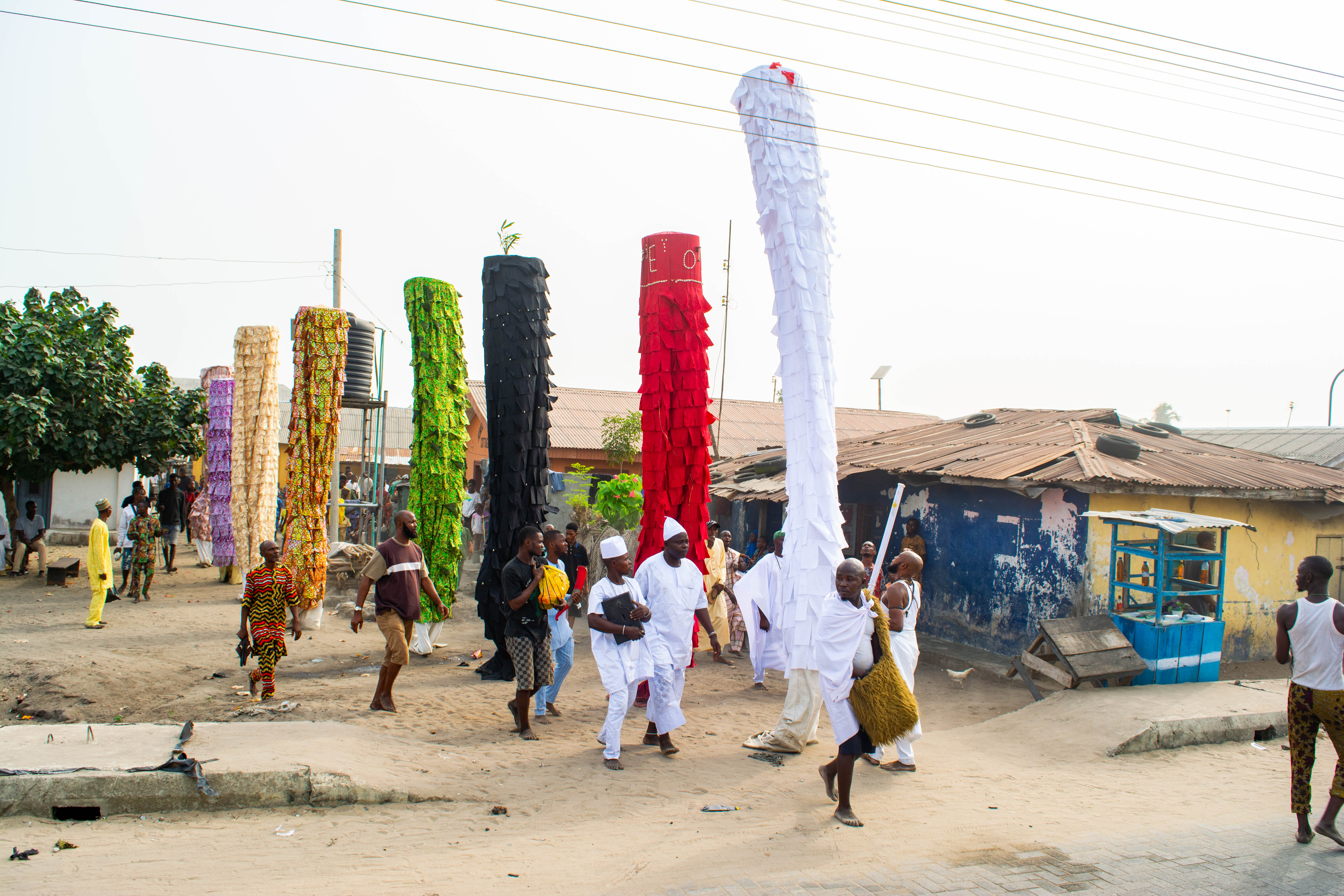
Igunnuko masquerades procession

Other significant Lagos festivals includes the Igunnuko Festival, celebrated with towering ancestral masquerades; the Agemo festival, honoring the spiritual unity of Yoruba communities; the Eluku festival, known for its mysterious rituals; the Ikorodu Oga Festival, which highlights Ikorodu's cultural heritage; and the Lagos Carnival, a colourful display of the city's multicultural vitality.

== See also ==
- Lagos
- Lagos State
- Tourist attractions in Lagos
- List of cultural assets in Lagos
