= List of cultural assets in Lagos =

Cultural assets in Lagos

Lagos state has several rich cultural heritage shaped by its history, geography, and diverse population. As a new world destination with a fledgling tourist industry. The Lagos State Heritage Law of 2011 classifies the state's cultural assets into various categories, including monuments, festivals, and other cultural assets. According to the law, these assets are recognized and protected as integral parts of the state's cultural heritage.

== Ikorodu Division ==
Name	Location	Inception	Category	Information
Iledi Osugbo Abalaye, Ajina Square	Ikorodu Central	August/October	Tangible Heritage	Built in 1810 in Ajina Square, Ikorodu, Iledi Osugbo Abalaiye is a historic site where tradition and power converge. It has long been the center for installing Obas and Chiefs through sacred rites and ceremonies.
Ikorodu Central Mosque	Ikorodu Central	1933	Tangible Heritage	The Ikorodu Central Mosque, founded on January 12, 1933, by Lemomu Buraimoh, is a historic symbol of faith and community in Ikorodu, Lagos.
Ikorodu Oga Statue	Ikorodu Central	2/2/1991	Monument	The Ikorodu Oga statue, towering over 15 feet at the Ikorodu Garage roundabout, honors Ogaremade, the founder of Ikorodu.
Odun-Osu Festival	Ikorodu Central	1992; Every November	Intagible Heritage	First royal festival of the year in which the 'Rogunyo' plays a crucial role.
Ikorodu Oga Festival	Ikorodu	September to October	Intagible Heritage	The Ikorodu Oga Festival, founded in 1992 by Asiwaju B. O. Benson (SAN), is an annual cultural celebration in Ikorodu, Lagos, showcasing the city's rich heritage.
Oro Festival	Ikorodu	May	Intagible Heritage	A festival held for cleansing of the land.
Agemo Palace and Shrine	lkorodu		Mixed Heritage	The Asa/Agere Festival in Ikorodu, Lagos, celebrates the unique tradition of stilt-walking, known locally as Agere, and is an important part of the region's cultural heritage.
Asa Arokolo	Ikorodu	December	Intagible Heritage	
Ijede/Odoro Spring Water	Ijede		Tagible Heritage	Ijede Spring Water, also known as Odoro Water Spring, is a natural spring in the Ijede community of Ikorodu, Lagos, discovered by Baba Odoro during a drought.
Eyibi Festival	Ijede		Intagible Heritage	The Eyibi Festival is an annual cultural celebration in Oke Eletu, Ijede, Lagos State, focused on unity, peace, and spiritual renewal.
Egbin Thermal Station	Egbin		Tagible Heritage	
Oba Ayangbure Palace	Ikorodu Central		Tangible Heritage	This historic palace is a symbol of the rich cultural heritage and traditions of the Ikorodu people
Etunrere Lofun losen	Ikorodu Central		Tangible Heritage	
Obateru of Egbin's Royal Palace	Egbin		Tangible Heritage	The palace of cultural heritage and traditions of the Egbin people.
Igunnuko Festival	Ikorodu	Every April	Intangible Heritage	

== See also ==
- List of Heritage Register
- Culture of Lagos
