= Oga (title) =

A title, word and name used in Yoruba and a word in Nigerian English

- Origin: Yoruba language
- Meaning: Boss, Patron, Chief, Leader, Master.

Oga (Yoruba: Ọ̀gá) is a title and name traditionally used by the Yoruba people of West Africa. It appears, either standalone, as a prefix or a suffix of certain chieftaincy offices (oyè), as well as in people's first and last / family names (oruko). Examples of such names include: Odùṣọ̀gá (Ifá acts as a leader/Ifa creates leadership), Ọ̀gábí (born to leadership), Ọ̀gáńlá (the great/big commander), Olúṣọ̀gá (lord is/makes the master), and Ògá, the legendary founder of Ikorodu, celebrated annually at the Ikorodu Oga Festival etc. The earliest Yoruba dictionaries from 1843 and 1852 define it as 'master; brave person; chief; headman; distinguished performer; superior officer; and teacher'.

Example of traditional institutions that incorporates the word are the Oga Alade (Ogalade) lit. Masters of the crown, but contextually meaning 'masters of specialized knowledge' such as Ifa divination, medicine and technology. They are one of the four traditional classes of the chiefly institution in Lagos, and include 11 members; The Obanikoro, Onisemo, Modile, Asajon, Opeluwa, and others. They usually don white hats, use round Abebe leather fans, and are responsible for handling traditional governance in the city.

Another are the Ọ̀gágun (Oga Ogun) lit. Master of war, found across Yorubaland as chiefs in command of military units or formations, similar to Balogun, or Oloriogun.

== Use in Nigerian Pidgin and English ==
The word Oga has carried over from the Yoruba language into Nigerian Pidgin, where it is used and pronounced in the same way, as an appellation for someone in some sort of position of authority, i.e person of rank relative to the person using it. It can also be used as an alias used in place of people's actual names for various reasons, in a manner similar to the use of Ogbeni (which can be polite or rude). Sometimes, the female version 'Oga-Madam' is used for the same purpose. The Oxford English Dictionary added and published the word entry in 2004, defines it as; 'A term used in Nigeria to denote someone with power and influence', traces its etymology to Yoruba, and notes its earliest appearance in English to the 1910's.

The word carries a nuanced social function. As an honorific in certain industries and occupations, it acknowledges rank and authority while creating some sort of familiarity, endearment or 'friendly atmosphere' simultaneously, perfectly mirroring how mundane social interactions normally or usually play out in everyday Nigerian settings.

Usage of the word has become preponderant among the various cultures of Nigeria, across all ethnic and linguistic boundaries. It has even been described as "Nigeria's universal power word" and a "Pan-Nigerian term".

== Popular culture ==
A popular Nollywood actor well known for his roles in various Yoruba and English language movies is Adebayo Salami, who uses the stage name Oga Bello. A 2015 Afrobeats song by D'Prince featuring Don Jazzy; "Oga Titus", narrates the satirical tale of a man who migrates into Lagos, carelessly spends all his limited funds on frivolities, becomes broke and suffers the consequences.

In a 2025 publication by Ghanalingo, a Ghanaian language and culture website, the site talks about "the growing influence and gradual infiltration of Nigerian Pidgin into Ghana’s own version of the language", with many social media users saying that the growing popularity of Nigerian traditional and social media content has been causing the adoption of Nigerian Pidgin words and expressions like Oga (replacing Bossu), while expressing apprehension that the unique nature of Ghanaian pidgin may become lost over time.

== See also ==
- Oyinbo
- Nigerian English
- Nigerian Pidgin
