= LBHF =

LBHF may refer to:

- Lagos Black Heritage Festival, an annual event in Lagos which includes the Lagos Carnival
- London Borough of Hammersmith and Fulham, a London borough in West London
