= Lagos Carnival =

Carnival Festival in Lagos

Lagos carnival
- Language: English

Origin
- Region of origin: Nigeria

The Lagos Carnival also known as the Fanti or Caretta Carnival of Lagos, is the most prominent in West Africa. The origins of the carnival dates back to the Lagos colonial period when the Yoruba Brazilian (Aguda or Amaro) former slave returnees came back to reside in Lagos in the 19th century.

The carnival is held annually during the Lagos Black Heritage Festival in Lagos. The carnival was re-instated in 2010. The event is usually centered on Lagos Island, filled with troop displays of costumes and various forms of entertainment including music and dancing.

== See also ==
- Brazilian Nigerians
- Aguda People
- Afro Brazilians
- Brazil–Nigeria relations
