= Welcome to Lagos (statue) =

Statue of three Lagos white-cap chiefs in Lagos, Nigeria

- Aro Meta (Yoruba), Agba Meta
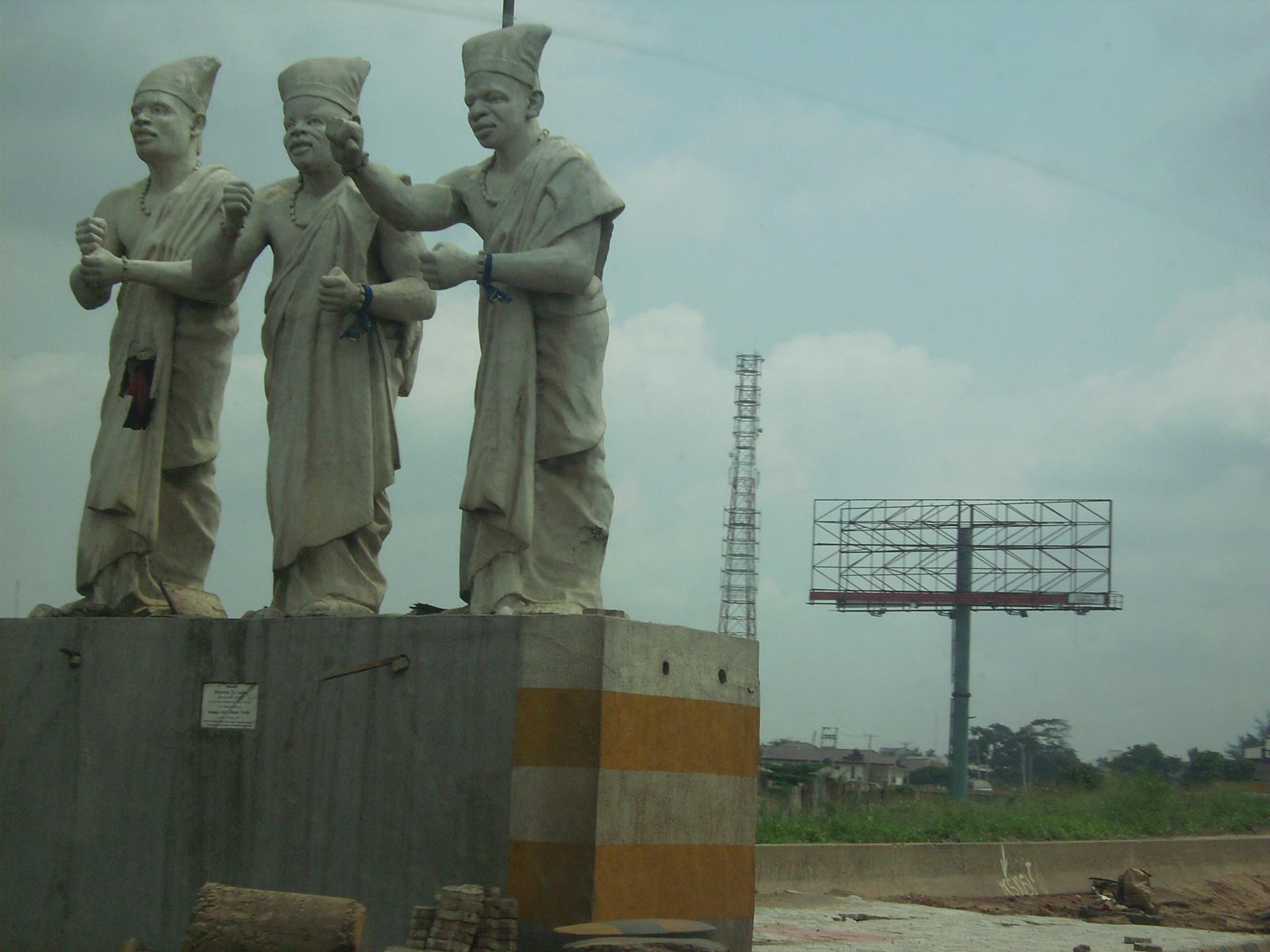

- Location of Welcome to Lagos
- Artist: Bodun Shodeinde
- Year: 1991: Original work 2004: Rehabilitated work
- Type: Sculpture
- Medium: Fibre glass
- Condition: Erect
- Location: Lagos, Lagos State, Nigeria; 6°35′1.464″N 3°58′32.916″E
- Owner: Lagos State Government

Welcome to Lagos (Yoruba: Agba Meta or Aro Meta) is an Art Deco statue of three Lagos white-cap chiefs located in Lagos, Nigeria. Designed by Bodun Shodeinde in 1991 and standing over 12 ft high, the three sculpted chiefs were built to welcome people coming into Lagos State.

== History ==
Welcome to Lagos was originally built in 1991 by Bodun Shodeinde under the administration of Colonel Raji Rasaki and was placed along the Lagos–Ibadan toll gate. Due to insinuations that the statue was the cause of the regular occurrence of road accidents along the Lagos–Ibadan Expressway, it was burnt down by some persons in 2004.

On 17 December 2004, it was rehabilitated and moved to its present location along Epe. In 2012, the statue was rehabilitated for the third time after it was burnt during the fuel subsidy saga.

== Structural and cultural background ==
Erected and placed upon a high pedestal to welcome people into the city of Lagos, Welcome to Lagos portrays the image of three white cap chiefs (Yoruba: Idejo) in slightly different positions, wearing white wrappers tied across their shoulders with their right fists clenched, thus symbolizing the strong belief of the supremacy of the right hand over the left.

The figure on the right-hand side stretches his fist forward to the air; with an inclined fist a bit down, the figure in the middle holds his right fist forward while the figure on the left brings his two fists together, slightly touching each other in the air.

Bodun Shodeinde, through this sculpture, depicted the highest honour that can be afforded to anyone in the Eko greeting tradition.
