= Nigerian Brazilians =

People with Nigerian ancestry

Nigerian Brazilian Nigeriano-brasileiro
- (Brazil) (Nigeria)

Total population
- 90,000 - 100,000

Regions with significant populations
- Brazil: Mainly metropolises in country's Central-Southern half and Northeastern region such as São Paulo, Brasília, Salvador, Rio de Janeiro, Recife and Porto Alegre

Languages
- Predominantly Portuguese and English

Religion
- Predominantly Muslim and Christian

Related ethnic groups
- Other Nigerian and Brazilian people in general, Afro-Brazilians

A Nigerian Brazilian (Portuguese: Nigeriano-brasileiro) is a Brazilian person of full, partial, or predominantly Nigerian ancestry, or a Nigerian-born person residing in Brazil.

The over 90,000 Nigerians living in Brazil. In September 2008, the Nigerian government opened the Casa da Nigéria or "Nigerian Culture House" in the historic Pelourinho neighborhood of Salvador, Bahia, with the support of the governments of Bahia and Brazil.

== 2011 Polemics on Racist University Professor in the Northeast ==
A case of xenophobic/racist prejudice of a university professor against a Nigerian student in the Federal University of Maranhão shocked the country in mid-2011. Thousands of students subsequently signed a petition calling for the expelling of the professor.

== See also ==
- Ethnic groups in Brazil
- Brazil–Nigeria relations
- Afro-Brazilians
