= Brazil–Nigeria relations =

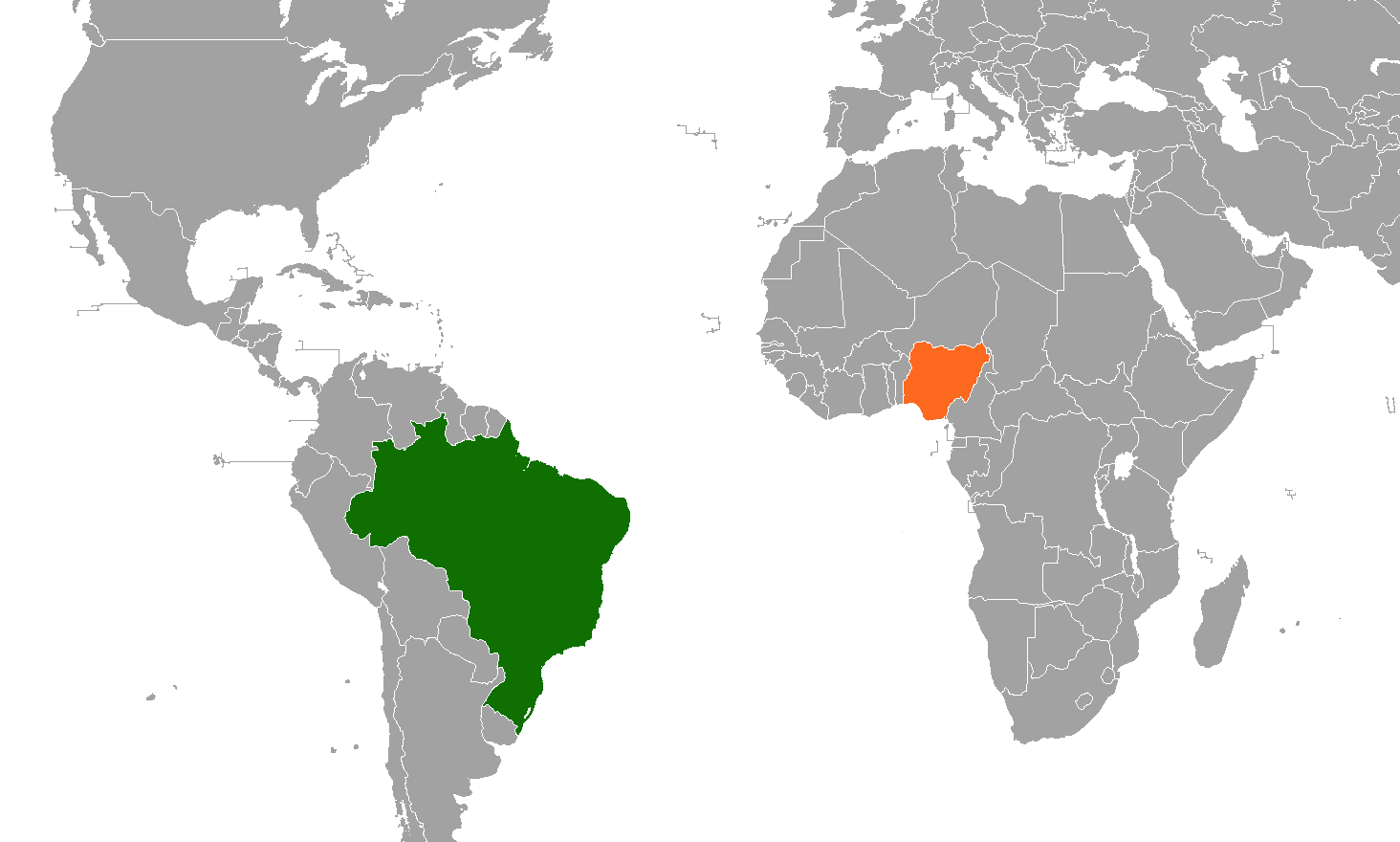

- Brazil: Nigeria

Brazil–Nigeria relations are the current and historical relations between the Federative Republic of Brazil and the Federal Republic of Nigeria. Brazil and Nigeria maintain a traditional and diversified relationship, with a strong Nigerian influence on Brazilian cultural and social formation. Both nations are members of the Group of 77 and the United Nations.

== History ==
During the Atlantic slave trade, Portugal transported many African slaves from Nigeria to Brazil, primarily to the Brazilian State of Bahia. In the 19th century, many emancipated Afro-Brazilians traveled to West Africa to settle. Brazilians in Nigeria became known as Agudas and created a Brazilian quarter in Lagos. A census taken in 1888 by the British colonial government in Nigeria recorded 3,221 Brazilians in Lagos.

In October 1960, Nigeria obtained its independence from the United Kingdom. Brazil was the only South American country invited to Nigeria's proclamation of independence and both nations established diplomatic relations. In 1961, Brazil opened a resident embassy in Lagos and in 1966, Nigeria opened a resident embassy in Brasília. Initially, relations remained relatively basic, centered more on cultural sentiments and historical affinity than on any deep commercial connection.

In 1983, President João Figueiredo became the first Brazilian head-of-state to visit Nigeria. In 2005, Brazilian President Luiz Inácio Lula da Silva paid a visit to Nigeria and the Brazilian embassy in Lagos was transferred to Abuja. That same year, President Olusegun Obasanjo became the first Nigerian head-of-state to visit Brazil. There have been several high-level visits between leaders and foreign ministers of both nations.

Brazil and Nigeria continue to maintain close cultural links. There have been joint efforts between Nigeria's Centre for Black and African Arts and Civilization and the Brazilian government (through Brazil's Special Secretariat) to promote policies on racial equality. In December 2019, Brazilian Foreign Minister Ernesto Araújo paid a visit to Nigeria and met with Foreign Minister Geoffrey Onyeama. During his visit, Foreign Minister Araújo stressed that three fundamental pillars should guide Brazilian-Nigerian cooperation: economy (trade and investment), defense and security, and the enhancement of human relations. Furthermore, both nations cited the potential of agricultural cooperation, with the development of technologies for agribusiness that ensure greater productivity without putting the environment at risk and highlighted the bilateral agricultural development program called Green Imperative.

== High-level visits ==
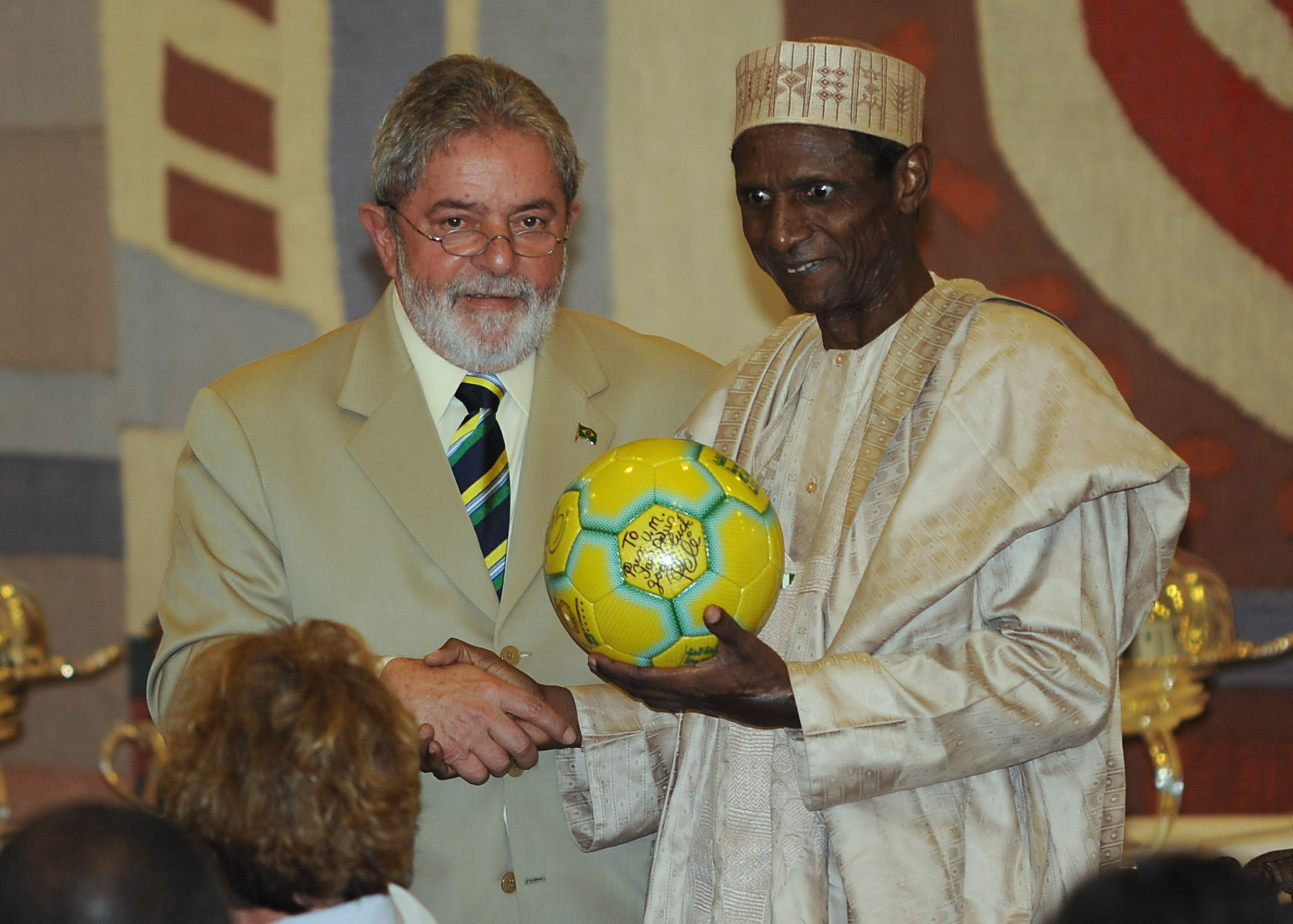
Brazilian President Luiz Inácio Lula da Silva and Nigerian President Umaru Musa Yar'Adua in Brasília; 2009.

High-level visits from Brazil to Nigeria

- Foreign Minister Mário Gibson Barboza (1972)
- Foreign Minister Ramiro Saraiva Guerreiro (1981)
- President João Figueiredo (1983)
- Foreign Minister Roberto Costa de Abreu Sodré (1986)
- Foreign Minister Celso Amorim (2005)
- President Luiz Inácio Lula da Silva (2005, 2006)
- President Dilma Rousseff (2013)
- Foreign Minister Aloysio Nunes (2017)
- Foreign Minister Ernesto Araújo (2019)

High-level visits from Nigeria to Brazil

- Foreign Minister Okoi Arikpo (1974)
- Foreign Minister Joseph Nanven Garba (1977)
- Vice President Shehu Musa Yar'Adua (1979)
- Foreign Minister Ike Nwachukwu (1988)
- Vice President Atiku Abubakar (2000)
- President Olusegun Obasanjo (2005)
- Foreign Minister Oluyemi Adeniji (2006)
- President Umaru Musa Yar'Adua (2009)
- President Goodluck Jonathan (2012)
- Foreign Minister Olugbenga Ashiru (2013)
- Vice President Namadi Sambo (2013)
- Foreign Minister Geoffrey Onyeama (2018)
- President Bola Tinubu (2025)

== Gallery ==
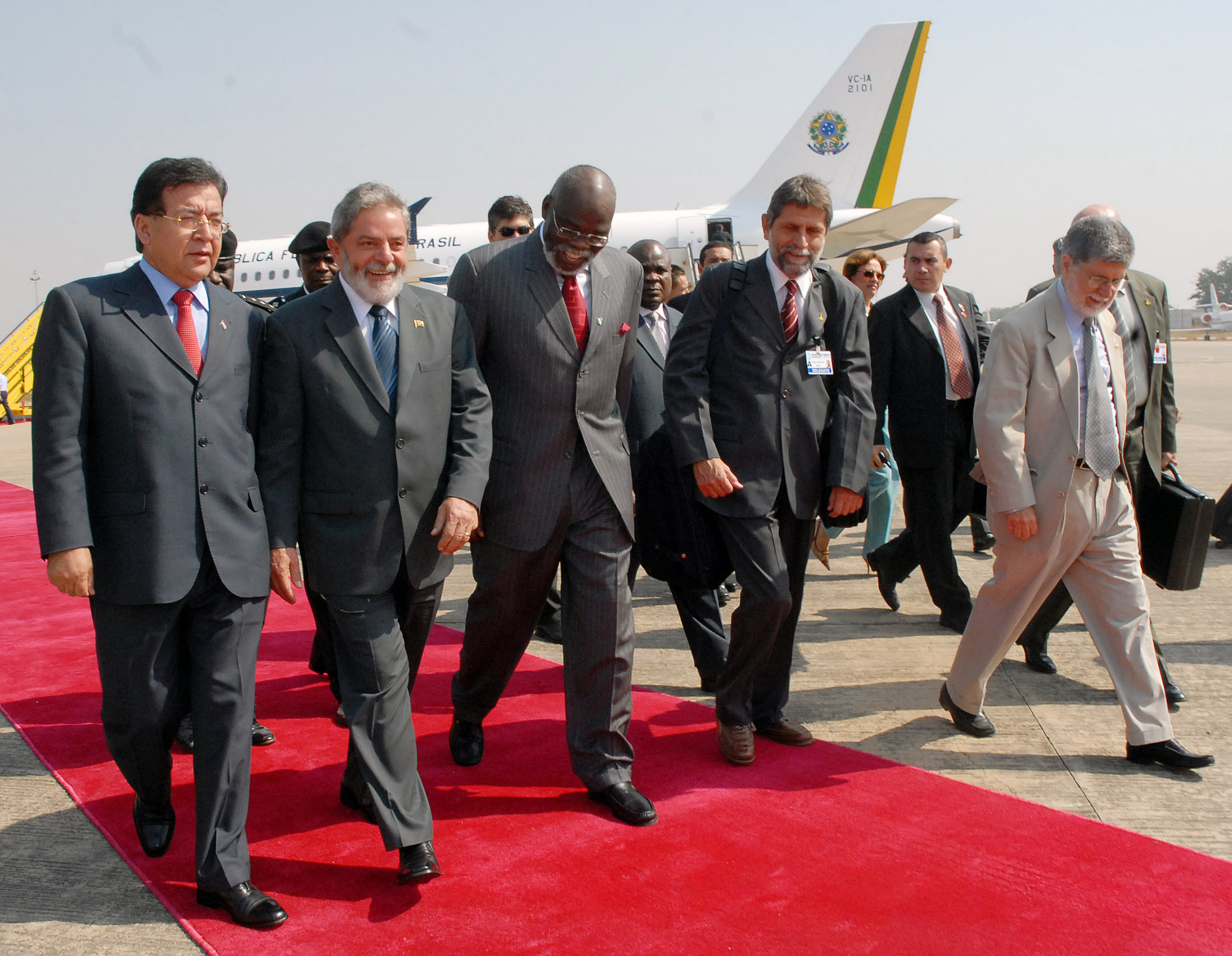
President Lula da Silva arriving to Nigeria; November 2006.

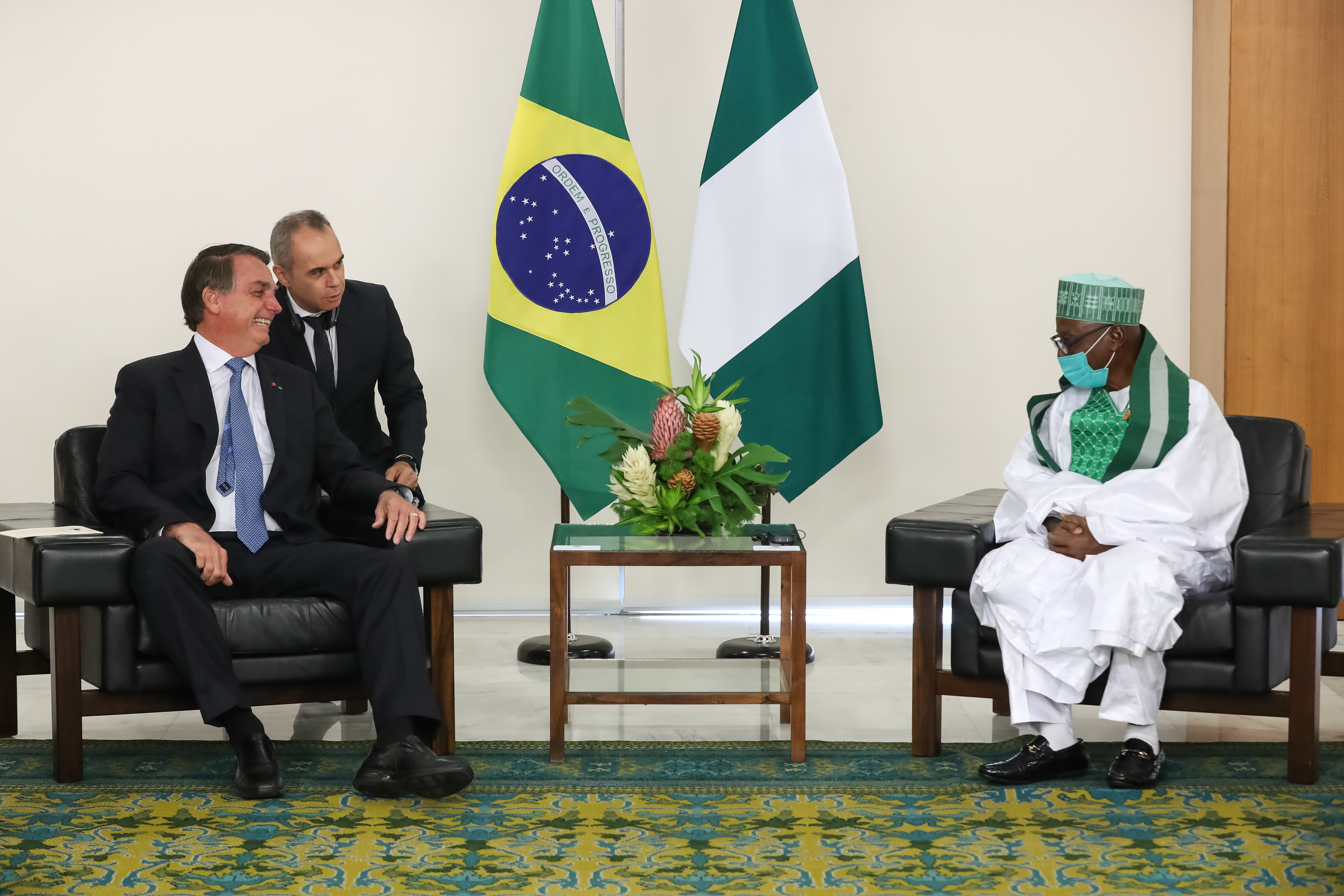
President Jair Bolsonaro meeting with newly incoming Nigerian Ambassador to Brazil, Muhammad Ahmed Makarfi; October 2021.

== Bilateral agreements ==
Both nations have signed several agreements such as an Agreement for Cultural and Educational Cooperation (2000); Agreement on Trade and Investment (2005); Agreement on Technical Cooperation (2005); Agreement on Cultural Cooperation (2005); Agreement for Regular Political Consultations (2005); Agreement on Energy Cooperation (2009); Memorandum of Understanding on broad areas of Cross-National Cooperation (2010); Agreement on Defense Cooperation (2010) and a Memorandum of Understanding for the creation of a Bilateral Strategic Dialogue Mechanism (2013).

== Cultural relations ==
Some former slaves in Brazil contributed their Yoruba heritage to local culture, and some of them settled in Nigeria in the 19th and 20th centuries, creating a Brazilian quarter in Lagos.

== Resident diplomatic missions ==
- Brazil has an embassy in Abuja and a consulate-general in Lagos.
- Nigeria has an embassy in Brasília.

== See also ==
- Afro-Brazilian history
- Brazilians in Nigeria
- Nigerian Brazilians
