= Gani Fawehinmi Park =

Public green space located in Lagos, Nigeria

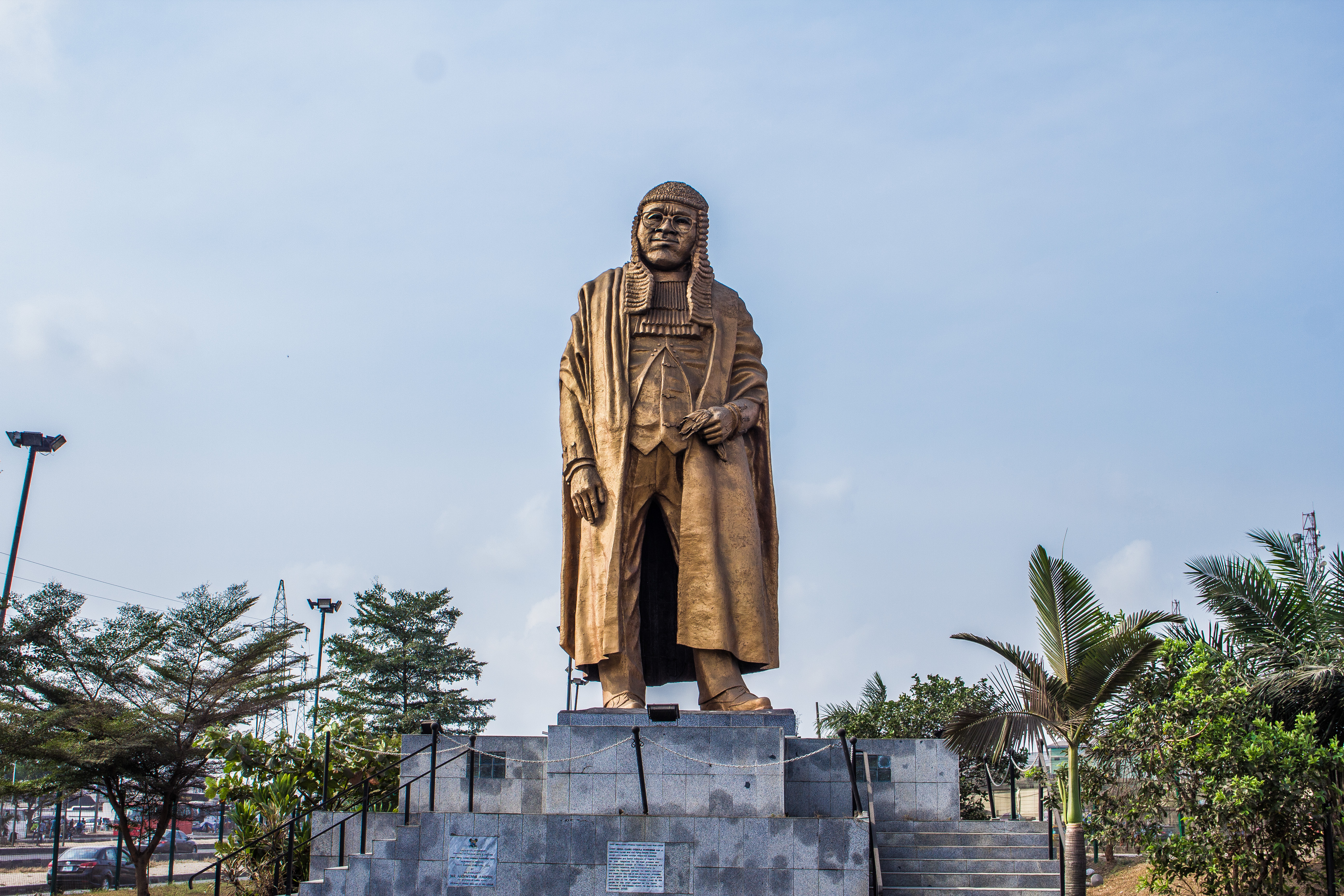
- A statue of Nigerian human rights activist and lawyer Gani Fawehinmi
- Interactive map of Gani Fawehinmi Park
- Coordinates: 6°35′32″N 3°22′54″E

Gani Fawehinmi Park, formerly known as Liberty Park, is a public green space located in Ojota, Lagos, Nigeria just by the Lagos-Ibadan Expressway and Ikorodu Road Interchange, Lagos. The park was built in honor of the Nigerian human rights activist and lawyer Gani Fawehinmi to which a large statue of his was conspicuously placed in the middle of the garden. This statue measuring 13 metres (44 feet) tall was commissioned 21 April 2018 by the Lagos State Government. The garden also has little signposts that tell a brief story about his lifetime. Other sculptures, soft landscape and benches were incorporated to make the space attractive and befitting for relaxation and small events. It was the venue of the Yoruba Nation Rally that happened 3 July 2021

== Gallery ==
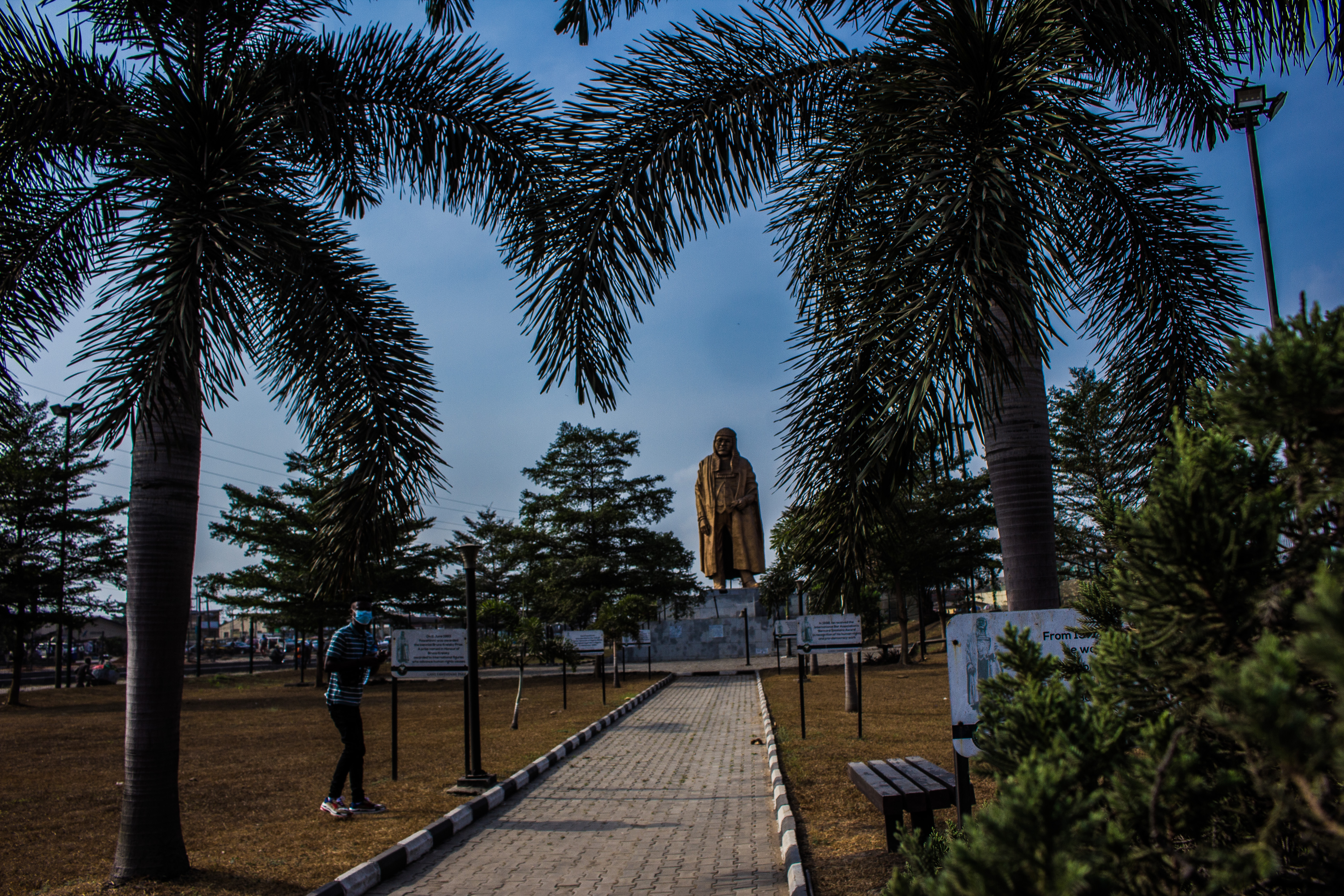

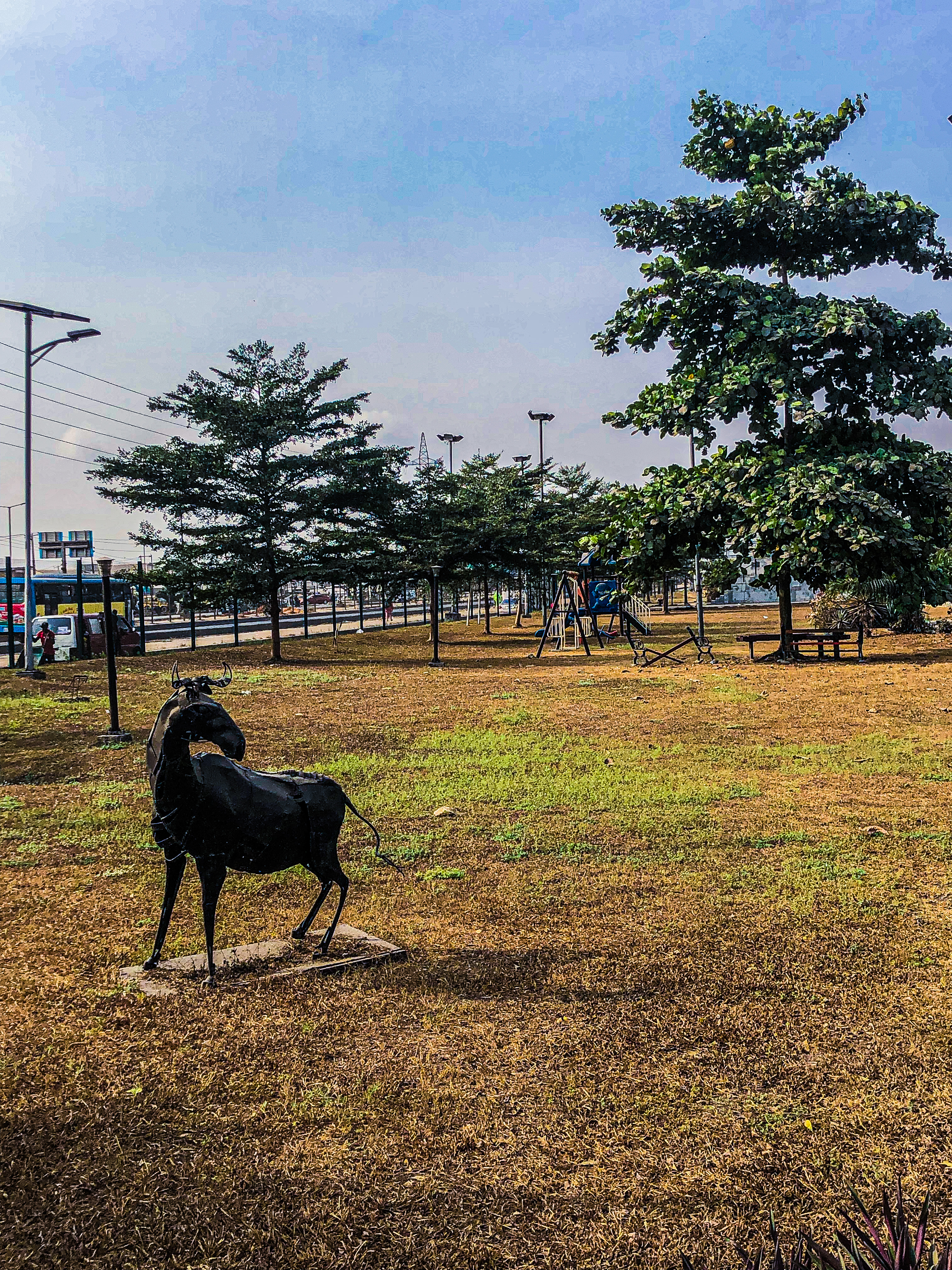

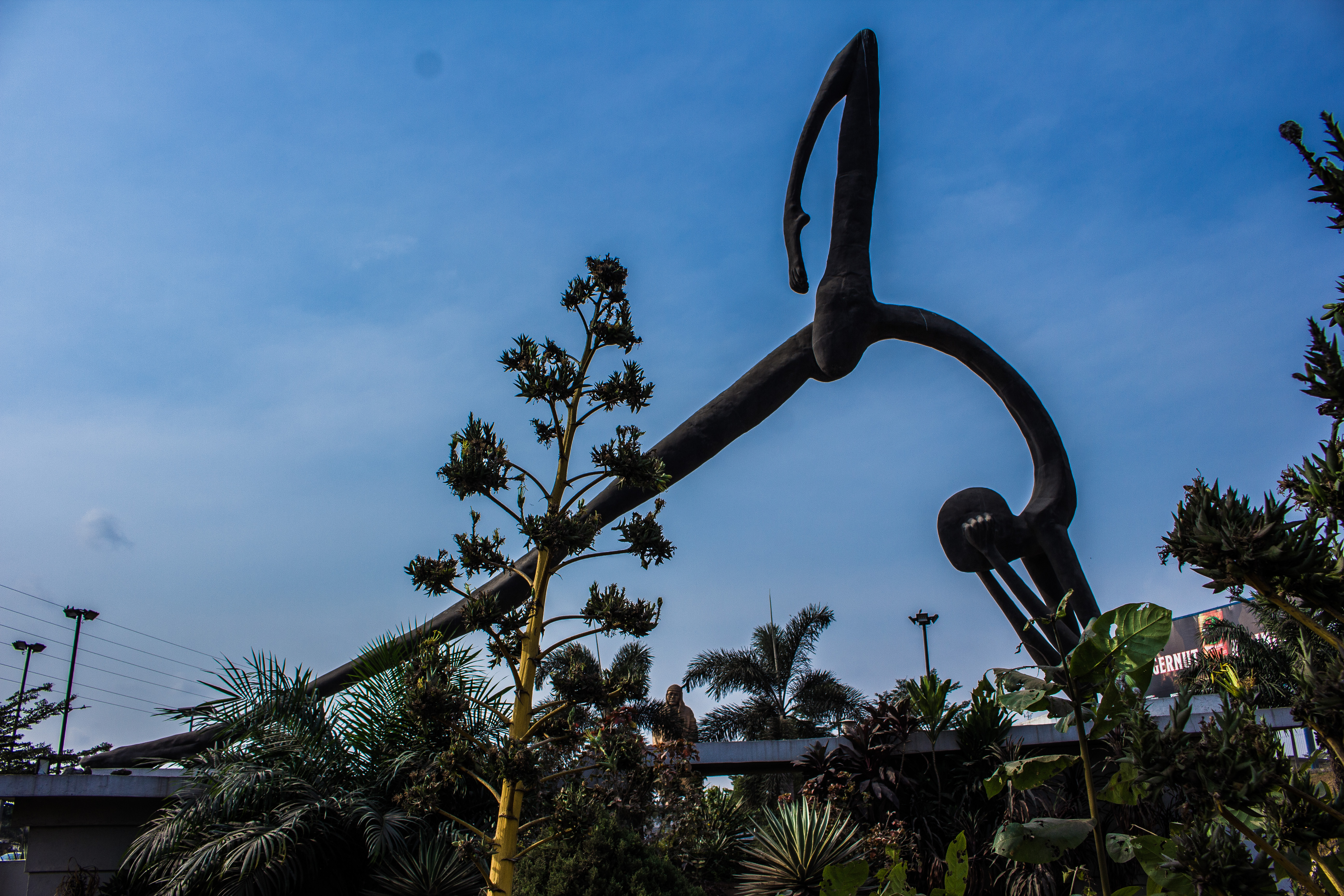

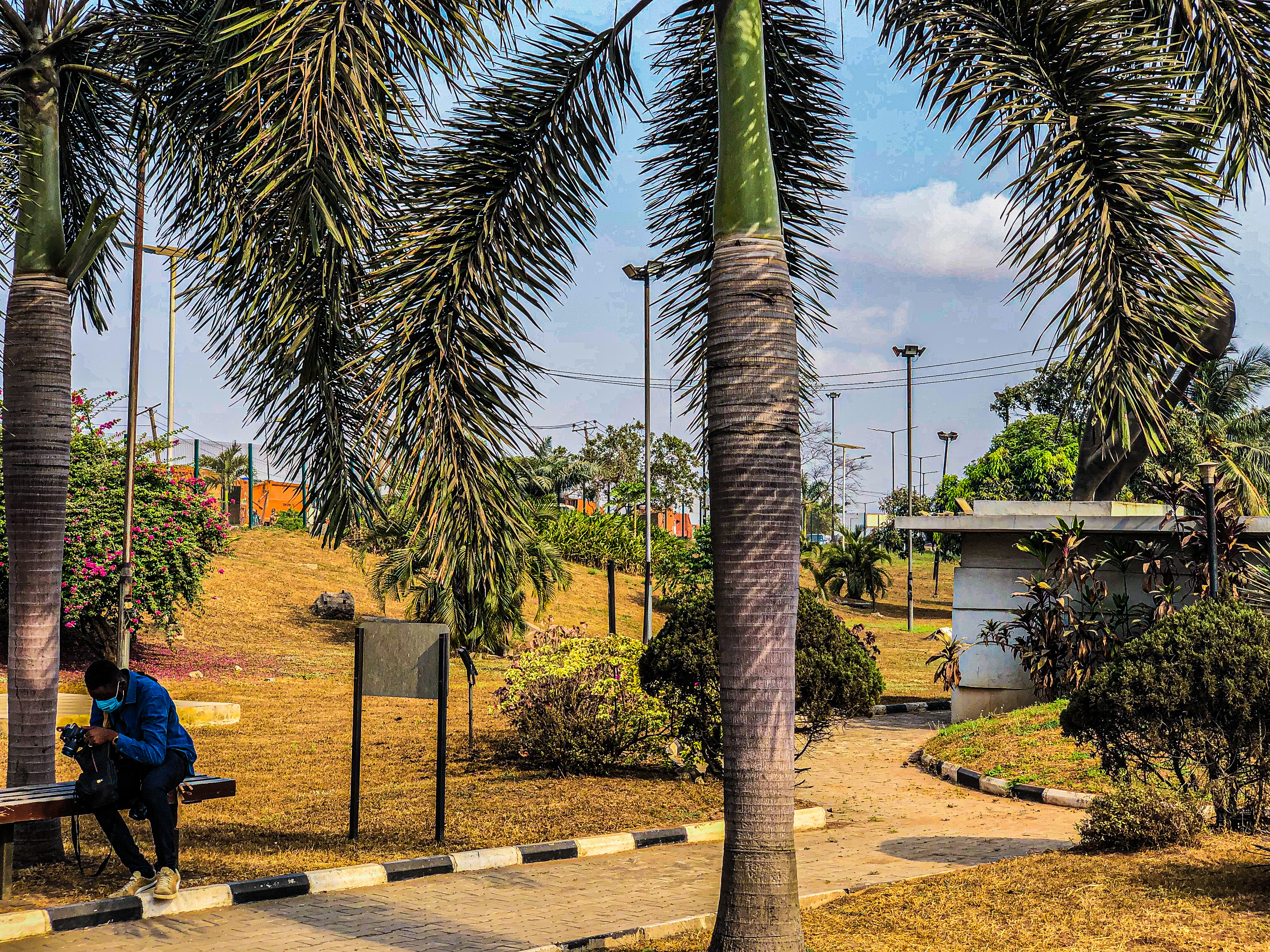
