= Soldier Idumota =

Cenotaph in Lagos, Nigeria

Coordinates: 6°27′40″N 3°23′15″E

- Sojadumota
- Nigeria
- For soldiers who died during World War I and World War II
- Unveiled: 1948
- Location: Idumota, Lagos Island, Lagos, Lagos State

Soldier Idumota (Yoruba: Sojadumota) sometimes called Unknown Soldier, is a cenotaph located in Idumota, a suburb of Lagos, in Lagos State, Nigeria. It was built and erected in 1948 by the British colonial government of Nigeria to commemorate the Nigerian soldiers who died during World War I and World War II.
