= Ikorodu Oga Festival =

- Status: Active
- Genre: Festivals
- Begins: 1992
- Location: Ikorodu Lagos State
- Country: Nigeria
- Founder: Asiwaju B. O. Benson

The Ikorodu Oga Festival is an annual cultural celebration held in Ikorodu, a city located in Lagos State, Nigeria. The festival was founded in 1992 under the leadership of Asiwaju B. O. Benson (SAN), a significant event in the city's cultural calendar, showcasing the rich heritage and traditions of the Ikorodu people. Also, it is the most attended festival amongst the festivals in Ikorodu.

== History ==
The Ikorodu Oga Festival has its roots in the city's history, dating back to the 16th century when Ikorodu was a major trading center. The festival would kick off with Woro Carnival, followed by Oga Social Night. Other activities slated for the festival week include a complimentary medical check-up, a musical and drama fiesta, and Indigenous reunion day. These events will culminate in a grand finale on Saturday, November 19, to be held at the Ayangbure Palace Pavilion, marking the climax of the celebration.

== Celebrations ==
The Ikorodu Oga Festival is typically celebrated over a period of seven days, featuring a range of activities, including Traditional processions featuring traditional dancers, musicians, and masquerades. Cultural performances also include Music, dance, and drama performances showcasing the city's rich cultural heritage.

== Significance ==
The Ikorodu Oga Festival is significant for several reasons. particularly, cultural preservation, economic benefit, community building.
