= Ikorodu Oga Statue =

Sculpture in Ikorodu, Lagos, Nigeria

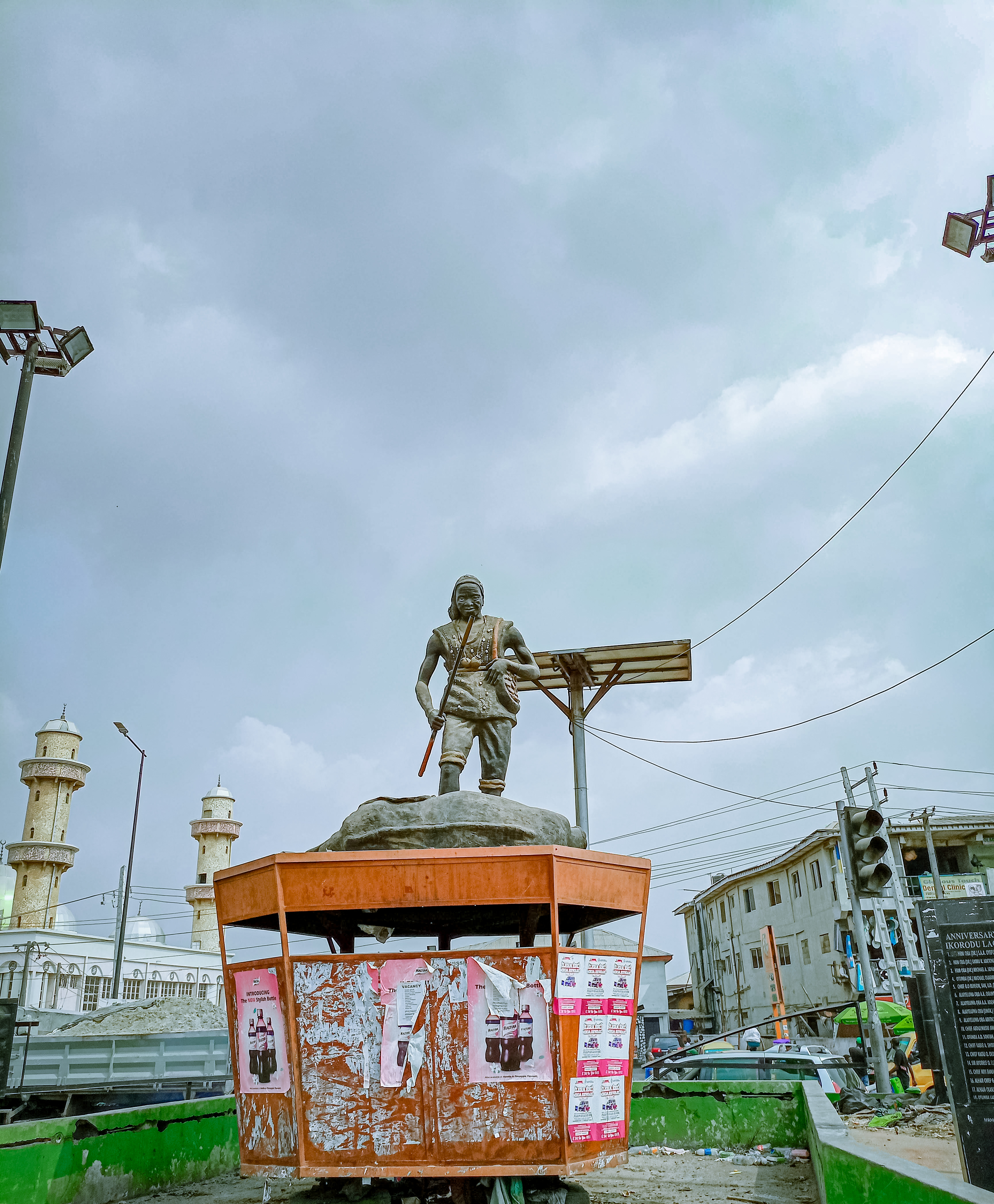
- Ikorodu Oga at the center of Ikorodu garage roundabout in Lagos

- Artist: Samuel Omobowale Oduyebo
- Year: 1991
- Medium: Concrete; Bronze
- Subject: Ogaremade
- Condition: Erect
- Location: Ikorodu, Lagos, Nigeria
- 6°36′N 3°30′E
- Owner: Lagos State Government

Ikorodu Oga is a concrete, bronze sculpture at the Ikorodu garage roundabout in Ikorodu, Lagos State, Nigeria, depicting a hunter standing upright over 15 ft on an elephant, holding a traditional rifle in his right hand and a hunting bag resting on his left shoulder, with a cap on his head. Its existence can be traced back to the 19th century; unveiled on February 2, 1991. The statue was designed by the late Samuel Omobowale Oduyebo. The statue symbolizes the bravery and leadership of Ogaremade, believed to be the founder of Ikorodu, a royal prince from Sagamu and a foundational figure in the establishment of Ikorodu in the 17th century.

== History ==
Ikorodu descended from the Remo subgroup of the Yoruba tribe, Initially established by, predominantly hunters and farmers from Sagamu. They named their settlement "Ikorodu" a name derived from "Oko-Odu," meaning "Odu farm," due to the areas abundant of "Odu" (a type of vegetable used for dyeing cloth). Over time, the name evolved from "Okorodu" to "Ikorodu". The settlement grew under the leadership of Oga Lasunwon, a prince of the Akarigbo lineage. Oga led the settlers in hunting and farming activities, laying the foundation for what became a thriving community. By 1630, a proportion of Benin migrants arrived and integrated peacefully with the Akarigbo children. By the mid-17th century, Ikorodu had developed into a significant settlement, with the institution of Obaship (kingship) reserved for the descendants of Akarigbo and the Olisaship (kingmaking) entrusted to the Benin settlers.

== Legend ==
Ogaremade, a hunter and warrior-prince, is credited with founding Ikorodu. His bravery was demonstrated when he killed a dangerous elephant that had threatened the safety of early settlers. This act of bravery solidified his leadership and role in establishing a centralised political structure for the community. He was instrumental in protecting the settlement from external threats, using his military expertise to consolidate political power. The legacy of Oga is ingrained in Ikorodu's history, with Ikorodu people proudly identifying as "Omo Ikorodu Oga" (Children of Ikorodu Oga).

== Traditions ==
=== Ikorodu Oga Festival ===
The Ikorodu Oga statue plays a central role in the annual Ikorodu-Oga Day Festival, a week-long celebration showcasing various activities, including parades, traditional music, dance performances, and cultural displays. The festival also features a procession known as Woro,where participants showcase traditional attire and masquerades while paying homage to local royalty.

=== Cultural Processions ===
The Woro procession is a significant part of the festivities,involving traditional groups, political organizations, and residents marching through Ikorodu to celebrate their heritage. This event includes performances by masquerade and cultural groups, enhancing community spirit and participation.

=== Ritual and Homage ===
The site of the statue is also crucial in local governance and rituals. During the installation of a new king, the king-elect undergoes ceremonial preparations at this location. These practices highlight the enduring importance of the statue in Ikorodu’s governance and cultural traditions.

== See also ==
- Akarigbo of Remo
- Ikorodu
