= Lagos Black Heritage Festival =

Annual event in Lagos, Nigeria

Lagos Black Heritage festival
- Language: English

Origin
- Meaning: Local Wrestling
- Region of origin: Nigeria

Lagos Black Heritage Festival (LBHF) is an annual event in Lagos that also includes the Lagos Carnival. The festival is a feast of culture and history aimed to showcase the richness and diversity of the African heritage. LBHF celebrates African creativity with diverse performances such as traditional and contemporary dance, drama, music, painting, and photography expositions among others.

The LBHF celebrates African creativity with a variety of performances, including traditional and modern dance, drama, music and painting, as well as a photo exhibition. Every year, the festival attracts a large number of tourists. Participants can relax and rest in a comfortable setting while also competing in motor power boat races and swimming, and watching the Boat Regatta. Traditional and modern performing techniques are combined to provide guests with a memorable cultural experience in Lagos.

The yearly festival is a cultural and historical feast aiming at showcasing the richness and diversity of African heritage, as well as celebrating African creativity through a variety of performances including traditional and modern dance, drama, music, and expositions. The combination of traditional and modern performing techniques is intended to present guests with a one-of-a-kind cultural experience in Lagos.

== History ==
The Lagos Black Heritage Festival (LBHF) was established in 2009 by Mr. Babatunde Raji Fashola led government administration, in remembrance of the African slave trade story. The festival is a three week-long festival that features lots of indigenous traditional and modern events.

The 2011 edition was tagged “Lagos Heritage week: Animating Heritage began with ‘FELA!, A Broadway play in Lagos which was displayed live for a week at the Eko Hotel and Suites Expo Centre at Victoria Island, Lagos. The show presented a documentation of the struggles and life of the late undeniable afrobeat musician.

In 2013, about 21 million people consisting of indigenes and non-indigenes attended the festival. This shows how large the Lagos Black Heritage festival has grown since it inception and due to the large turnout, the festival generates a large amount of revenue both economically and socially.

== Festivity ==
The three-week long festival celebrates African creativity with traditional and contemporary Dance, Drama, Music, Painting, Photo exposition and others. It features events such as; the Lagos Water Regatta, the Lagos International Jazz, Drama, Dance, Art Exhibition, Beauty Pageant Context (where the Carnival Queen will emerge), and on the last day, it is rounded up with parties where all clubs in Lagos will host people at chosen venue within Lagos.

Some of the Highlights of the 2015 edition are as follows; Vision of the Child — Children/Pupils Competition and Exhibition Programme; Masquerade Parade from Badagry; Exhibitions – Children Art & Art fair/Bazaar; Do Your own Thing – Talent hunt programme for youths; Drama & Dance Drama – six plays on showcase and Poetry & Music – Night of the Poets.
